= List of Oggy and the Cockroaches episodes =

This article is an episode list for Oggy and the Cockroaches, a French animated series created by Jean-Yves Raimbaud and produced by Gaumont Multimedia, Tooncan and Xilam, which has aired since 1999. "The Magic Pen" ("Crayon Magique") is currently the most-viewed episode on YouTube with over 188 million views.

== Series overview ==
Season	Segments	Episodes	Originally released		
Season	Segments	Episodes	First released	Last released	Network
1	78	26	September 6, 1999	February 11, 2000	France 3
2	78	26	September 4, 2000	April 5, 2003	France 3
3	39	13	October 18, 2008	December 24, 2008	Canal+ Family
4	74	26	January 2, 2012	December 12, 2013	Canal+ Family
Film			August 7, 2013		Canal+ Family
5	76	26	June 30, 2017	July 30, 2018	Gulli
6	78	26	May 16, 2017	August 3, 2018	Gulli
7	78	26	March 19, 2018	January 30, 2019	Gulli
Next Generation	78	13	July 28, 2022		Netflix

== Episode list ==
=== Season 1 (1999–2000) ===
No. overall	No. in season	Title (French title bottom)	Directed by	Story by	Storyboard by	Original release date
1a	1a	"Bitter Chocolate" "(Chocolat Amer)"	Olivier Jean-Marie	Jim Gomez	François Reczulski	September 6, 1999
A light blue cat named Oggy gets a box of cherry-chocolates delivered to his home and goes inside to enjoy them. However, his archenemies, three mischief-making cockroaches named Dee Dee, Joey, and Marky, have decided to take the sweets for themselves, and a chase begins throughout the house. Oggy's cousin, Jack, nurses Oggy and vows to get back the box of sweets, even if it involves blowing up the house.
1b	1b	"It's All Under Control" "(Coup de Cafard)"	Olivier Jean-Marie	Olivier Jean-Marie	Laurent Nicolas	September 9, 1999
During an afternoon, Jack is snoozing on his hammock while Oggy is tending to the garden. The roaches jump into Jack's head so that they can control him to wreak havoc on Oggy.
1c	1c	"French Fries" "(Les Frites)"	Olivier Jean-Marie	René-Louis Sauger	Pascal David	September 7, 1999
After making some French fries, Oggy intends on having a well-deserved snack. However, the cockroaches, who have gone bug-eyed looking at the platter, steal the fries, which results in a chaotic chase throughout the house to see who can pry the French fries from the other's hand. Note: The gag involving Oggy hanging on the ceiling upside down was recycled from the pilot (although in this episode's case, he lands on a potato cutter rather than mousetraps like in the pilot).
2a	2a	"Mission Oggy"	Olivier Jean-Marie	Serge Thiriet	Rudy Bloss	September 8, 1999
When Oggy is gone shopping, the roaches destroy his entire house by making a big mess. Oggy, upon his return, sees Dee Dee, who has trapped himself in a drink bottle, and then locks the roach up in the fridge. Oggy then proceeds to install a hi-tech security system. Seeing this, the remaining roaches rescue their fellow man, and it turns out that Dee Dee ate all the food while being locked inside the fridge.
2b	2b	"It's Been a Hard Day's Noise" "(Tchao Tympan)"	Olivier Jean-Marie	Philippe Pierre-Adolphe	Pascal David	September 10, 1999
All Oggy wants to do is to sit back, relax, and listen to his music CD he just got, but the trouble-making roaches have trashed the players. Oggy then peeks inside the CD player, but the reader lasers his face instead of the CD. The cockroaches eventually follow him to make more noise, and noise, and noise, and noise!
2c	2c	"The Patient" "(Le Patient)"	Olivier Jean-Marie	Olivier Jean-Marie	François Reczulski	September 13, 1999
Poor Jack. One minute he was just minding his own business, the next minute, he ends up frozen in a block of ice chasing the cockroaches! And Oggy becomes his full-time nurse. Seeing this, the roaches decide to exchange Jack's healthy medicine for a concoction of their own, then fake symptoms of a deadly, dangerous disease so that Jack will need to drink more of their deadly drink. However, Oggy does not notice anything. Can Jack avoid the roaches' deadly, dangerous "medicine"?
3a	3a	"Shake Oggy Shake" "(Rythmes et Bleus)"	Olivier Jean-Marie	Michel Gaudelette	Rudy Bloss	September 14, 1999
While Oggy and Jack wake up to a foot of dust, the cockroaches crank up Oggy's coffee so that he will do everything extremely fast, making it more difficult for Jack to catch up.
3b	3b	"The Rise and the Fall" "(Plus dure sera la chute)"	Olivier Jean-Marie	Olivier Jean-Marie	François Reczulski	September 15, 1999
Jack is building a skyscraper, his future home, and invites Oggy to stay for a night, but Oggy has a fear of heights and cannot sleep. Jack helps Oggy get back to sleep, but Oggy starts to sleepwalk, and the cockroaches keep sabotaging the skyscraper, resulting in Jack being forced to save Oggy.
3c	3c	"It's a Small World" "(Petit, Petit, Petit)"	Olivier Jean-Marie	Olivier Jean-Marie	Didier Degand	September 16, 1999
Exasperated at the cockroaches ransacking the fridge, Oggy clamps a lock on the fridge and has barely put it in his pocket when they steal it and hide in the washing machine. Oggy uses a photocopier to shrink himself down to the size of the cockroaches, so he can infiltrate their hideout and take back the key.
4a	4a	"Happy Birthday" "(Joyeux Anniversaire)"	Olivier Jean-Marie	Michel Gaudelette	Christophe Pittet	September 17, 1999
While Oggy and Jack are setting up Oggy's birthday party, the cockroaches crash the party and cause mischief. To make matters worse, Oggy develops suicidal tendencies following an incident involving Jack's champagne glass pyramid, leaving the latter to put himself through the wringer to protect him.
4b	4b	"Metamorphosis" "(La Métamorphose)"	Olivier Jean-Marie	Savy Durand	Rudy Bloss	September 20, 1999
After Oggy consumes a piece of glowing chocolate (obviously placed by the roaches), he transforms into a cockroach himself, much to the cockroaches' amusement. Little by little, Oggy gets used to his new appearance.
4c	4c	"Jealousy" "(Jalousie)"	Olivier Jean-Marie	Olivier Jean-Marie	Rudy Bloss	September 21, 1999
Before he met Olivia, Oggy had another girlfriend. He invites his unnamed girlfriend over to his house for dinner one rainy day. The roaches perform all the usual pranks, but all Oggy can do is stand by the window. However, as she arrives, Marky falls in love with her, while Joey and Dee Dee are stuck in a spring. Oggy starts to get jealous due to the two lovebirds' date. This jealousy soon escalates into a big brawl!
5a	5a	"Wrong Side of the Bed" "(Vendredi 13)"	Olivier Jean-Marie	Thierry Benenati	François Reczulski	September 22, 1999
On Friday the 13th, Oggy gets involved in quite a few accidents associated with bad luck, but he doesn't know that the cockroaches are behind all the incidents.
5b	5b	"Go Slow with Your Dough" "(Sois Zen avec l'Oseille)"	Olivier Jean-Marie	Olivier Jean-Marie	Thomas Szabo	September 23, 1999
Jack has to pay a major debt, so he brings an attaché of green-backs to Oggy's house and hides it under the rug, without revealing to Oggy any details about it. Knowing that all that money is in his house, Oggy spends the day finding a good hiding spot for it. The cockroaches decide to make hiding the bills a nightmare for Oggy, to the point he becomes paranoid.
5c	5c	"Tooth Good to Be True" "(Dent de Lait)"	Olivier Jean-Marie	Olivier Jean-Marie	François Reczulski	September 24, 1999
As one of Oggy's baby tooth comes off, he puts it under his pillow for the Little Mouse. Upon witnessing Oggy getting a few coins, Joey plans on losing his own teeth so that he can buy a can of pop. However, after one tooth, he decides to lose all of his and Oggy's teeth for money, which makes Oggy unhappy.
6a	6a	"One Track Life" "(Une Vie Duraille)"	Olivier Jean-Marie	Olivier Jean-Marie	Patrick Claeys	September 26, 1999
While Jack is hooked up on video games, Oggy decides to pass time with his old train set. The cockroaches see light of the situation, and use the train which passes everywhere to load food when it passes the fridge. Oggy immediately hops on a car after witnessing this, and a train car chase begins.
6b	6b	"Mouseagator" "(Grignotator)"	Olivier Jean-Marie	Olivier Jean-Marie; Jean de Loriol; Philippe Olivier	Christophe Pittet	September 27, 1999
After getting accidentally run over by Oggy's new remote-controlled lawnmower, the cockroaches get their revenge by forging their own cat-destroyer machine that looks like a mouse, but acts like an alligator.
6c	6c	"Nine Months and Counting" "(37°2 toute la journée)"	Olivier Jean-Marie	Olivier Jean-Marie	Thomas Szabo	September 28, 1999
The cockroaches pump Oggy's belly full of air and inflate him while he is sleeping as a prank, making him think that he is somehow pregnant. However, he will soon find out the hard way that only women can have babies, not men.
7a	7a	"A Tip for the Road" "(Soigne ton code)"	Olivier Jean-Marie	Nicolas Gallet	François Reczulski	September 29, 1999
Oggy takes driving lessons from a blind and partially deaf driving instructor and the cockroaches interfere, shifting the experience into chaos around town.
7b	7b	"The Outsider" "(Cherchez l'intrus)"	Olivier Jean-Marie	Jean Louis Capron	Christophe Pittet	September 30, 1999
A mouse makes its way into Oggy's household, taking whatever it wants, namely food and shelter. Oggy has a fear of mice, and even the cockroaches are not getting on well with the mouse.
7c	7c	"Baby Doll" "(Jolie Poupée)"	Olivier Jean-Marie	Nicolas Gallet	François Reczulski	October 1, 1999
While Oggy is playing with his doll and its included dollhouse, the cockroaches have taken the playhouse for themselves. When Marky spots the doll, he falls in love with and marries it; this results in Oggy making an all-out siege on the playhouse to take back what is rightfully his own.
8a	8a	"So Lonely" "(La Solitude)"	Olivier Jean-Marie	Paul Nougha	Véronique Madelenat	October 2, 1999
Oggy finally manages to remove the cockroaches out of his home permanently by sealing them in a food can and throwing this can away. He gradually regrets doing so and eventurally starts to miss them, leading to a severe tantrum, so Oggy starts to play practical jokes onto himself (but not very successfully).
8b	8b	"Oggy and the Giant Roaches" "(Oggy et les Cafards géants)"	Olivier Jean-Marie	Michel Gaudelette	François Reczulski	October 3, 1999
Oggy believes that he is seeing huge things after the cockroaches implant binocular lenses into his eyes and use it for their advantage.
8c	8c	"Oggy and the Babies" "(Oggy et les Bébés)"	Olivier Jean-Marie	Michel Gaudelette	Patrick Claeys	October 5, 1999
After eradicating the cockroaches from their house, Oggy and Jack receive 3 baby kittens that look like Jack. However, they realize that those kittens are actually the cockroaches in disguise, obviously in retaliation for being kicked out of the house.
9a	9a	"The Carnival's in Town" "(Tremblez manèges!)"	Olivier Jean-Marie	Olivier Jean-Marie	François Reczulski	October 4, 1999
With the carnival coming to town, Oggy, Jack, and the cockroaches decide to go. However, the cockroaches have massive fun wreaking havoc all over the place.
9b	9b	"A Dog Day Afternoon" "(Comme des chiens)"	Olivier Jean-Marie	Olivier Jean-Marie	François Reczulski	October 5, 1999
Oggy arrives at home after shopping and trips over a small puppy. He takes it inside and starts using his own nose as a squeezing toy to play with the puppy. With Jack arriving, he and the cockroaches begin to think that Oggy has gone crazy, as Jack and the puppy are not seen simultaneously.
9c	9c	"Fishing Frolic" "(Jeux de carpes)"	Olivier Jean-Marie	Olivier Jean-Marie	François Reczulski	October 6, 1999
Jack takes Oggy on a fishing trip, with neither of them knowing that Dee Dee has come along with them. While Jack keeps a large, over-amorous fish at bay, Oggy is learning how to fish, while Dee Dee eats all of the bait (except for one of them), especially their lunch.
10a	10a	"Rock 'n Roll Altitude"	Olivier Jean-Marie	Olivier Jean-Marie	Lionel Allaix	October 7, 1999
Oggy has a fear of flying, and while taking him on a flight on a 747, Jack tries hypnosis to help him relax. However, this only causes problems. Meanwhile, cockroaches take the control over the plane.
10b	10b	"It's a Long Way Down" "(La Tête et les Muscles)"	Olivier Jean-Marie	Olivier Jean-Marie	Olivier Poirette	October 8, 1999
As Jack takes up mountain climbing, Oggy intends on reading a good book from his library, only to end up getting stranded in some very high book shelves by the cockroaches.
10c	10c	"Oggy's Night Out" "(Un dîner en ville)"	Olivier Jean-Marie	John Loy	Christophe Pittet	October 11, 1999
Oggy and Jack have a meal out at a fancy restaurant in New York City. Things take an unexpected bad turn, as the cockroaches keep stealing their orders and Jack cannot wait any longer to tuck in.
11a	11a	"The Time Machine" "(Voyage dans le temps)"	Olivier Jean-Marie	Michel Gaudelette	Dominique Etchecopar	October 13, 1999
Oggy gets in an accident involving Jack against the cockroaches in retaliation of his cake being eaten, ending up being squashed into a disk. To make sure that he will never repeat this mistake twice, Jack builds a time machine to go back in time and prevent the accident.
11b	11b	"Oggy's Diet" "(Le Régime d'Oggy)"	Olivier Jean-Marie	John Loy	Véronique Madelenat	October 11, 1999
Overweight Oggy decides to keep fit, much to the dismay of the cockroaches. They decide to perform the usual sabotages to make sure that Oggy stays the way he is.
11c	11c	"Globulopolis"	Olivier Jean-Marie	Christopher Assefi	François Reczulski	October 7, 1999
Dee Dee is just swimming on Oggy's yogurt, when, unknown to him, Oggy drinks it up with Dee Dee inside. He then travels around Oggy's body and decides to give Oggy the mother of all indigestions.
12a	12a	"Occupied" "(Occupé)"	Olivier Jean-Marie	Nicolas Gallet	Lionel Allaix	October 17, 1999
Oggy desperately needs to use the bathroom, but the cockroaches have it occupied and do all what they can to keep him out of it. He eventually manages to use the bathroom, but the cockroaches end up trapping him there.
12b	12b	"House for Rent" "(Maison à louer)"	Olivier Jean-Marie	Nicolas Gallet	Thomas Szabo	October 18, 1999
The cockroaches rent Oggy's house to a redneck who literally kicks Oggy out. In order to get his house back, Oggy finally rents it out to an obese wrestler.
12c	12c	"The Lottery Ticket" "(Le Ticket de loto)"	Olivier Jean-Marie	Michel Gaudelette; Manu Larcenet	François Reczulski	October 14, 1999
Oggy and Jack won the lottery ticket number for a massive amount of money until Dee Dee gets a hold of it.
13a	13a	"The Bait Bites Back" "(L'âppat se rebiffe)"	Olivier Jean-Marie	Paul Nougha	Thomas Szabo	October 19, 1999
Oggy and Jack are going fishing, but Oggy tries to catch the cockroaches as bait. In the end, the bait fights back with a bazooka, captures the cockroaches and uses them as fishing bait.
13b	13b	"Deep End" "(Le Caillou qui voulait nager)"	Olivier Jean-Marie	Olivier Jean Marie	Marc Gordon-Bates	October 21, 1999
Taking a simple bath soon escalates into a desperate struggle for Oggy when the cockroaches deflate his floating ring, especially when he is extremely afraid of water.
13c	13c	"Space Roaches" "(Les Cafards De l'espace)"	Olivier Jean-Marie	John Loy	Christophe Pittet	October 20, 1999
Three alien cockroaches from another planet (obviously resembling Dee Dee, Marky and Joey genetically) visit Oggy's household. They constantly shape-shift Oggy and Jack into different objects and share good moments with the regular cockroaches.
14a	14a	"Granny's Day" "(Mamie Jubile)"	Olivier Jean-Marie	François Reczulski	François Reczulski	October 26, 1999
With Oggy's grandmother coming to visit on her birthday, all what she wants is three dead cockroaches.
14b	14b	"Toy's R Oggy" "(Remue-méninges)"	Olivier Jean-Marie	Michel Gaudelette	François Reczulski	October 25, 1999
Oggy has found a lot of new toys for him to play with during Christmas Eve, but when an extended boxing glove punches Jack, his brain gets knocked out of him. To make the holiday matters worse, the cockroaches use it as a toy and an initiative.
14c	14c	"Memory Lane" "(Souvenirs, souvenirs)"	Olivier Jean-Marie	Paul Nougha	Luis Ruiz	October 27, 1999
Oggy finds some old love letters from a girl he used to go to school with. However, the cockroaches play a more rotten-than-usual prank, which involves faking a date and replacing Oggy's deodorant with his homemade insect repellent that stinks very badly.
15a	15a	"The Hiccup" "(Aux secousses!)"	Olivier Jean-Marie	René-Louis Sauger	Lionel Allaix	October 22, 1999
What started out as a sip from a simple cup of coffee turns into intensely strong hiccups for Oggy, and while attempting to steal his fridge, the cockroaches get involved with his situation.
15b	15b	"Oggy Goes Snailing" "(Coquilles en stock)"	Olivier Jean-Marie	Olivier Jean-Marie	Thomas Szabo	October 27, 1999
Oggy found a poor snail and kept it as a pet and bought a lot of snails he enjoys. However, he is about to be in for one slippery ride.
15c	15c	"Cat Kit" "(Kit en tas)"	Olivier Jean-Marie	Paul Nougha	François Reczulski	October 28, 1999
Jack arrives with a put-it-together-yourself roach-catching trap. When he tries to get some silence to work, the cockroaches try their best in causing as much noise as possible; this forces poor Oggy to try to keep them quiet.
16a	16a	"Docu-Mentally" "(Micro-craignos)"	Olivier Jean-Marie	Nicolas Gallet	Lionel Allaix	November 3, 1999
Oggy gets a video camera in the mail and attempts to film the cockroaches' final demise. However, just as he could get to watching the end of it, the roaches decide to get their ultimate revenge by stealing his tape and humiliating Oggy.
16b	16b	"The Dictator" "(Le Dictateur)"	Olivier Jean-Marie	Olivier Jean-Marie	François Reczulski	October 26, 1999
While helping to catch the cockroaches, Jack suddenly starts acting like a ruthless, superior-minded dictator to Oggy, reducing him to a downtrodden proletariat as that will evolve into a struggle between control and freedom, which also results with the cockroaches helping.
16c	16c	"Oggy vs. Super Roach" "(Super Cafard)"	Olivier Jean-Marie	Jean Louis Capron	Thomas Szabo	November 3, 1999
While repairing the cockroaches' TV on one stormy night, Dee Dee gets struck by lightning, which gives him superhuman strength. However, Dee Dee lets this get to his head, causing him to be a bully towards Oggy and even his fellow cockroaches, Marky and Joey.
17a	17a	"Beware of Destruction" "(Attention Travaux)"	Olivier Jean-Marie	Olivier Jean-Marie	Luis Ruiz	December 7, 1999
While Jack is renovating Oggy's house, the cockroaches steal his cement tray to use it as a swimming pool, and Jack ends up as a statue when the cockroaches put cement in his drink. To make matters worse, they are about to take full advantage of his severe disadvantage.
17b	17b	"Heatwave" "(Canicule)"	Olivier Jean-Marie	Olivier Jean-Marie	François Reczulski	November 3, 1999
The cockroaches fight Oggy over getting a sun tan. Their main scheme this time has them in a tire-made hot-air balloon under the guise of a real rain cloud.
17c	17c	"Oggy and the Magic Flute" "(C'est pas du pipeau)"	Olivier Jean-Marie	Jean Louis Capron	François Reczulski	November 9, 1999
After seeing a snake charmer on TV, Oggy decides to make his own flute, in which he steals a car part from his neighbour Bob. Upon adding holes to it, Oggy plays it and unwittingly hypnotises Marky into being a dog that would remain loyal to him, much to the dismay of Dee Dee and Joey.
18a	18a	"A Bird of Ill Omen" "(Chasse toujóurs... tu m'intéresses)"	Olivier Jean-Marie	Nicolas Gallet	Thomas Szabo	November 10, 1999
Oggy is minding his own business, watering his flowers when a turkey comes running and hides behind his back. Shortly after, a visually impaired hunter appears from the hedge. The hunter has a problem because of his very poor eyesight: turkeys looks like Oggy to him vice versa.
18b	18b	"Duck Soup" "(La Révolte des canards)"	Olivier Jean-Marie	Michel Gaudelette	René-Louis Sauger	November 11, 1999
Oggy and Jack were making and preparing duck soup for their dinner, with the main ingredient being the duck itself until a lot of its anger, protesting duck friends show up (thanks to the cockroaches) and take over the house.
18c	18c	"Winner Takes All" "(Qui perd gagne)"	Olivier Jean-Marie	Nicolas Gallet	Lionel Allaix	November 15, 1999
Conflict begins between Oggy and Jack after cockroach Joey sabotages a game of chess just by stealing one of the pieces.
19a	19a	"The Ghost-Hunter" "(Oggy contre les fantômes)"	Olivier Jean-Marie	Olivier Jean-Marie	François Reczulski	November 15, 1999
After Oggy finally manages to kill the cockroaches with a frying pan, their spirits come back and constantly make nightmares a reality for him in the afterlife. Oggy has to do a ritual to survive the terror of the three ghosts.
19b	19b	"Bugball" "(Balle au but)"	Olivier Jean-Marie	Olivier Jean-Marie	Olivier Jean-Marie	November 22, 1999
Oggy gets his hands on a new, super bouncing-ball. He decides to try it out and it soon bounces all over the house, wrecking everything in its path. However, things get worse when Joey accidentally swallows it.
19c	19c	"Happy Campers" "(Les Joies du plein air)"	Olivier Jean-Marie	Olivier Jean-Marie	François Reczulski	November 23, 1999
After a number of mishaps while Oggy and Jack go camping, starting with Dee Dee eating a plant that causes hallucinations to the user, they end up enraging a wild boar who follows them home.
20a	20a	"The Piggy Bank" "(La Tirelire)"	Olivier Jean-Marie	Paul Nougha	François Reczulski	November 24, 1999
To stop the cockroaches from taking his food and drinks, Oggy puts a padlock on the fridge and puts the key in his piggy bank. When Oggy gets thirsty, the piggy bank is indestructible so he must figure out how to get the key.
20b	20b	"Oggy's Clone" "(Le Clône d'Oggy)"	Olivier Jean-Marie	Olivier Jean-Marie	Thomas Szabo	November 25, 1999
The cockroaches play a hit-and-run prank where they frame Oggy by dressing up as him and attacking Jack.
20c	20c	"A Truce for Christmas" "(La Trêve de Noël)"	Olivier Jean-Marie	Paul Nougha	Luis Ruiz	November 26, 1999
The cockroaches are planning on ruining Oggy's Christmas, but after they are thrown outside, Oggy makes a truce between them. Meanwhile, Jack must survive a huge snow storm to get to Oggy's house for Christmas.
21a	21a	"TV Obsession" "(Complètement accro)"	Olivier Jean-Marie	Michel Gaudelette	François Reczulski	November 26, 1999
Oggy is hooked onto his favorite TV program. However, this does not stop the cockroaches from having fun by locking his TV safe.
21b	21b	"Race to the Finish!" "(À tout berzingue!)"	Olivier Jean-Marie	Jean-Louis Capron	Jef Gallato	November 29, 1999
Jack bought Oggy a remote control car and they want to race with them, but the cars chase the cockroaches to run them all over.
21c	21c	"Monster from the Mud Lagoon" "(La Nuit du Grime)"	Olivier Jean-Marie	Jean-Christophe Dessaint	Patrick Claeys	November 30, 1999
Oggy watches a scary movie about a Monster from the Mud Lagoon, while Jack trips over a mud puddle, believing that he is really the monster. Joey, Marky, and Deedee try all what they have in their sleeves to intensify Oggy's fear for Jack.
22a	22a	"The Garden of Horrors" "(Le Jardin des supplices)"	Olivier Jean-Marie	Nicolas Gallet	Thomas Szabo	December 1, 1999
Oggy was just minding his business, gardening the grass while the cockroaches made it worse by making them bigger, alongside the hedgehog and angry bunny.
22b	22b	"Caught in a Trap" "(Pris au piège)"	Olivier Jean-Marie	François Reczulski	François Reczulski	December 1, 1999
After the cockroaches have plundered his fridge and caused a huge mess which makes Oggy's eyes pop out of his head, Oggy wakes up and finds his house completely messed up. He is now forced to do the best he can to protect the fridge.
22c	22c	"Blue Sunday" "(Tout le charme d'un week end)"	Olivier Jean-Marie	Olivier Jean Marie	François Reczulski	December 2, 1999
Jack takes Oggy on a Sunday trip to a beach as the destination, with the cockroaches deciding to tag along. However, they end up stuck in a traffic jam.
23a	23a	"Cloning Around" "(La Multiplication des cancrelats)"	Olivier Jean-Marie	Jean Louis Capron	Lionel Allaix	December 3, 1999
With useless roach-killing nerve agents in the insecticide, Jack decides to enhance it by using his new chemistry set to his advantage. The result is a gas that has the ability to quickly copy the subject it was used on.
23b	23b	"3 Wishes and You're Out" "(Les Trois Vœux)"	Olivier Jean-Marie	Michel Gaudelette	René-Louis Sauger	December 6, 1999
A bedouin, who is lost and thirsty in the Arabian desert, finds a magic lamp. He uses his three wishes to get a palace, a pile of gold and lovely girls – but he forgets to wish for water. The genie flees after being attacked by the infuriated bedouin and ends up in Oggy's house in New York.
23c	23c	"Virtual Voyage" "(Voyage virturel)"	Olivier Jean-Marie	Jean Louis Capron	Lionel Allaix	November 8, 1999
It is all out Cyberspace War as Oggy, with his vacuum cleaner, and Joey takes the daring voyage in the electrical system to the internet in order to return to the real world. However, system errors, bugs, power flows and even Jack himself are hellbent on slowing Oggy and Joey down.
24a	24a	"The Abominable Snow Moth" "(Mite des neiges)"	Olivier Jean-Marie	Jean Louis Capron	René-Louis Sauger	December 8, 1999
Things go wrong in winter when a snow moth comes into Oggy's house and eats any yarn.
24b	24b	"The Neighbor's Cat" "(Le Chat de la voisine)"	Olivier Jean-Marie	Nicolas Gallet	Thomas Szabo	December 9, 1999
A fat woman treats Oggy as a pet dog when the neighbor's real cat made it happen, while the cockroaches want Oggy stay that way by all means.
24c	24c	"A Night at the Opera" "(Première à l'Opéra)"	Olivier Jean-Marie	Olivier Jean Marie	François Reczulski	December 10, 1999
With Jack going to perform at the opera as a tenor, Dee Dee wishes to join in and tries to team up with him. However, Jack tosses him in a trash can as his way of saying "no". Seeing it will take more than that to break Dee Dee's dream, he decides to ruin the performance and take it all for himself.
25a	25a	"Honeymoon" "(Lune de miel)"	Olivier Jean-Marie	Jean Louis Capron	François Reczulski	December 10, 1999
When Oggy is eating jam, it brings along an old bee which cockroach Joey is in love with, starting up a literal honeymoon, involving irritating Oggy.
25b	25b	"Loony Balloons" "(Zig zags pour deux zigues)"	Olivier Jean-Marie	Nicolas Gallet	François Reczulski	December 14, 1999
Oggy and Jack share a ride in a remote-controlled hot-air balloon. However, it soon becomes a joyride when their remote ends up in the cockroaches' hands.
25c	25c	"Beachcombers" "(Sandwich au sable)"	Olivier Jean-Marie	Olivier Jean Marie	François Reczulski	December 15, 1999
Oggy is going to the beach for what he thinks will be a relaxing day off, not noticing that the cockroaches decide to tag along. When they are near each other, trouble is bound to happen.
26a	26a	"Emergency Room" "(Urgences)"	Olivier Jean-Marie	John Loy	Olivier Jean Marie	January 3, 2000
Oggy is sent to the hospital after tripping down the stairs while chasing the cockroaches. Later, the cockroaches visit the hospital just to cause more trouble for Oggy. Note: The opening's refrigerator and staircase scenes were recycled from the pilot.
26b	26b	"Oggy and the Magic Broom" "(Balai à réactions)"	Olivier Jean-Marie	Olivier Jean Marie	Jef Gallato	January 5, 2000
A wizard quietly sleeps over at Oggy's house for the duration of the day. Meanwhile, the cockroaches fight over the usage of his flying broom against Oggy.
26c	26c	"Oggy Van Winkle" "(Vieilles Canailles)"	Olivier Jean-Marie	Nicolas Gallet	Patrick Claeys	February 11, 2000
The cockroaches receive a zapping from Oggy's newly invented time-freezing gun. When the cockroaches, somehow untouched for decades, are unfrozen thanks to a poodle marking its territory on them, they wake up in the future, where they see Oggy and Jack at a very old age. The cockroaches decide to take advantage of this, which results in a chaotic fight the future has never seen before.

=== Season 2 (2000–03) ===
No. overall	No. in season	Title (French title bottom)	Directed by	Story by	Storyboard by	Original release date
27a	1a	"Fame & Glory" "(En piste)"	Olivier Jean-Marie	Olivier Jean-Marie	Lionel Allaix	September 4, 2000
Oggy really wants to go to the circus but has no money so Jack makes a circus for himself. However, the cockroaches decide to cause trouble for them.
27b	1b	"Hide and Sick" "(L'Art du camouflage)"	Olivier Jean-Marie	Michel Gaudelette	François Reczulski	September 5, 2000
Seeing Oggy sick, the cockroaches decide to take advantage of his current situation, while Jack is trying to cure Oggy of his illness. However, everytime he tries to cure Oggy with a pair of syringes, they keep striking Bob when Oggy sneezes.
27c	1c	"Love & Kisses" "(La Sœur d'Oggy)"	Olivier Jean-Marie	Olivier Jean-Marie	François Reczulski	September 6, 2000
Oggy's sister, Monica, comes over for a visit. As soon as Monica shows up, Jack falls head-over-heels in love for her and tries to be a thrillseeker like her. However, the cockroaches decide to ruin the couple's relationship.
28a	2a	"Milk Diet" "(De pis en pis)"	Olivier Jean-Marie	Olivier Jean-Marie	François Reczulski	September 6, 2000
After Dee Dee wins a cow in a lottery, he brings it to Oggy's house. To make more milk, Dee Dee brings a bull to Oggy's place, but his plan eventually backfires.
28b	2b	"Wash Day" "(Ça baigne!)"	Olivier Jean-Marie	Jean-Louis Capron	François Rosso	September 7, 2000
While attempting to give Dee Dee a bath, the cockroaches accidentally turn the entire suburb into an ocean.
28c	2c	"Crazy Shopping" "(Oggy fait du shopping)"	Olivier Jean-Marie	Nicolas Gallet	Patrick Claeys	September 8, 2000
Oggy arrives at the supermarket with the cockroaches tagging along. Soon, their never-ending squabble results in Oggy knocking down a huge pile of detergent. Oggy is literally kicked out by the security guard, who blames Oggy for the whole incident, and forced to disguise himself in order to enter the shop and complete his errands.
29a	3a	"Ski Bugs" "(Tout schuss)"	Olivier Jean-Marie	Olivier Jean-Marie	Lionel Allaix	September 13, 2000
While Oggy and Jack are skiing a ski resort, the cockroaches tag along and trick Oggy into sledding down a very steep, dangerous slope.
29b	3b	"All Out of Shape" "(En pleine déforme)"	Olivier Jean-Marie	Jean-Louis Capron	Ludovic Hell	September 20, 2000
While Oggy was playing and using his limitless imagination with clay, the cockroaches use a clay Oggy as a voodoo doll to literally shape Oggy's life into a wreck in all the ways possible.
29c	3c	"Roachy Redneck" "(Le Cousin de la cambrousse)"	Olivier Jean-Marie	Jean-Louis Capron	Lionel Allaix	September 20, 2000
A redneck cockroach comes to visit Oggy's house. The little redneck befriends Oggy and uses his ability to make plants come to life in order to help him garden, which the latter enjoys.
30a	4a	"Hit the Road, Oggy!" "(Bonnes vacances, Oggy)"	Olivier Jean-Marie	Nicolas Gallet	François Reczulski	September 27, 2000
Oggy plans on going with his camper but the cockroaches repeatedly ruin it for him.
30b	4b	"Penguin Pandemonium" "(Madame le pingouin)"	Olivier Jean-Marie	Michel Gaudelette	François Reczulski	September 27, 2000
Oggy and Dee Dee wake up to find their fridge occupied by a penguin and its egg. They try to eat the egg, creating conflict with the penguin who repeatedly outsmarts them.
30c	4c	"That's the Last Straw!" "(La Fin des haricots)"	Olivier Jean-Marie	Olivier Jean-Marie	Lionel Allaix	October 2, 2000
The cockroaches attempt to fool Oggy and Jack by putting a piece of bubblegum on the telescope, which makes the cats think that there is a meteor coming.
31a	5a	"Perpetual Motion" "(Mouvement perpétuel)"	Olivier Jean-Marie	Michel Gaudelette	François Rosso	September 27, 2000
While repairing a broken TV remote, Jack accidentally creates a magic remote that can control time. Upon discovery, Jack starts playing with this new remote but Joey later steals it for his own purposes.
31b	5b	"Life's a Beach" "(Touristamania)"	Olivier Jean-Marie	Olivier Jean-Marie	François Reczulski	October 4, 2000
Due to a bizarre weather event, the sun only shines on Oggy's house while it rains everywhere else. Jack turns the backyard into a commercial beach for everyone to do whatever they want, but Oggy gets assaulted by the customers, and needs all the urgent help he can get, even if it means from the cockroaches.
31c	5c	"Saving Private Dee Dee" "(Maman, tu piques!)"	Olivier Jean-Marie	Jean-Louis Capron	François Rosso	October 5, 2000
Tired of having his vegetable patch invaded by the cockroaches, Oggy decides to protect his vegetables with an electric barbed wire fence. However, Dee Dee accidentally gets trapped in the patch, then starts to cry like a baby. A hedgehog hears this and adopts Dee Dee, which forces Joey and Marky to go and rescue him.
32a	6a	"Laughing Gas" "(Le Poil à rire)"	Olivier Jean-Marie	Michel Gaudelette	Ludovic Hell	October 6, 2000
Jack's latest device at eliminating the cockroaches from the house ends up in the wrong hands when they manage to get Oggy to drink it. They are armed with some real wacky laughing gas as well.
32b	6b	"Hip Hip Hip Hypnoses" "(Hip hip hip hypnose!)"	Olivier Jean-Marie	Nicolas Gallet	François Rosso	October 6, 2000
Marky learns how to perform hypnosis and plans to hypnotize Oggy for his own purposes.
32c	6c	"Missing in Action" "(Perdu de vue)"	Olivier Jean-Marie	Nicolas Gallet	Ludovic Hell	October 9, 2000
While jogging at Bienvenue Park, Jack goes wrong for Oggy when he trips over, causing him to try to catch up. However, the cockroaches are around to make matters worse for the cats.
33a	7a	"Take Cover" "(Tous aux abris!)"	Olivier Jean-Marie	Jean-Louis Capron	Patrick Claeys	October 9, 2000
When the cockroaches tease him by believing that there is a real war in the backyard, Jack's love for playing toy soldiers turns into a nightmare.
33b	7b	"Copy Cat" "(Mecanic Oggy)"	Olivier Jean-Marie	Jean-Louis Capron	François Reczulski	October 10, 2000
When the cockroaches break the ear of one of Oggy's most precious figurines, he gets so frustrated and heart-broken that he simply sits still in the sofa, holding the piece of the broken ear in his hand. Dependent on him, the cockroaches decide to build a robot to take Oggy's place in chasing them around.
33c	7c	"High Flyers" "(C'est du vol)"	Olivier Jean-Marie	Paul Nougha	Jean-Charles Fink	October 10, 2000
After the cockroaches see a TV program about a cardinal that is afraid of flying, they challenge each other to fly over Oggy's swimming pool.
34a	8a	"The Wonder Whistle" "(Arrêt sur images)"	Olivier Jean-Marie	Paul Nougha	François Rosso	October 11, 2000
Oggy receives a time-freezing whistle in the mail along with earmuffs, but when the cockroaches notice this, they trick him into thinking that he has frozen them in time. They then steal the whistle while Oggy is asleep, causing mayhem in the city by freezing everything.
34b	8b	"The Hungry Ostrich Empire" "(L'Empire de l'autruche hongroise)"	Olivier Jean-Marie	Olivier Jean-Marie	Fabien Brandily	October 11, 2000
Oggy is forced to look after an ostrich for Jack. When it starts eating anything around the house, the cockroaches get involved with the ostrich chase. Dee Dee and Marky plan to eat the ostrich but Joey wants to ride it instead.
34c	8c	"Golf Curse" "(Les Rois du green)"	Olivier Jean-Marie	Olivier Jean-Marie	Thomas Szabo	December 12, 2000
After Oggy knows that Jack claims that he is not a good golfer, they suffer from attacks of the targets of Jack's wild swings and the cockroaches' presence.
35a	9a	"Working Cat" "(Un Q.I. de 120)"	Olivier Jean-Marie	Paul Nougha	François Rosso	October 16, 2000
With rising electricity bills and lack of money, Oggy decides to take up a job test with the cockroaches' support.
35b	9b	"Beware of the Bodyguard" "(Gare au gorille!)"	Olivier Jean-Marie	Nicolas Gallet	François Rosso	October 17, 2000
With the cockroaches causing the usual trouble, Oggy is sick and tired of them bullying him all the time, so he decides to get a bodyguard.
35c	9c	"My Beautiful Prison" "(De l'or en barreaux)"	Olivier Jean-Marie	Paul Nougha	Olivier Jean-Marie	October 18, 2000
As Oggy is given a treasure map by the cockroaches, he must break into a maximum security prison, which results an all-out prison siege.
36a	10a	"Go for It, Jack!" "(Plaies et Amour)"	Olivier Jean-Marie	Olivier Jean-Marie	Olivier Jean-Marie	October 19, 2000
Oggy wants to play table tennis, but Jack gets busy trying to impress Monica. Seeing this, the cockroaches try their best to ruin Jack's attempts but he ends up conquering his love.
36b	10b	"Do Not Lean Out of the Window" "(Le Train complètement fou)"	Olivier Jean-Marie	Olivier Jean-Marie	Olivier Jean-Marie	October 24, 2000
Oggy's taking a train home to the suburb until the cockroaches decide to give him their own way of handling the railways.
36c	10c	"Soldier for a Day" "(Les Trois Jours qui changèrent le monde)"	Olivier Jean-Marie	Olivier Jean-Marie	François Rosso	October 23, 2000
Oggy is drafted into the military, given the fact that he is fit for service. As the cockroaches come along and cause havoc in the boot camp, as well as to get Oggy into trouble, Oggy turns out to be much better at housework than army work.
37a	11a	"7 Minutes & Counting" "(Six minutes pour vivre)"	Olivier Jean-Marie	Michel Gaudelette	Fred Vervisch	October 26, 2000
After Oggy is bitten by a poisonous snake, Jack has to take care of him. However, the cockroaches try to prevent him from doing so, as well as allowing the poison inside Oggy to kick in.
37b	11b	"Mayday! Mayday!" "(La croisière, ça m'use!)"	Olivier Jean-Marie	Olivier Jean-Marie	François Rosso	November 1, 2000
Oggy's cruise trip is interrupted by Dee Dee while Jack, Marky, and Joey are feeling seasick.
37c	11c	"Warning! Boa on the Run!" "(Oggy et le Boa gobeur)"	Olivier Jean-Marie	Michel Gaudelette	Patrick Claeys	October 30, 2000
Upon returning from a picnic in Bienvenue Zoo with Jack, Oggy finds a boa constrictor in his picnic basket. In the process, it consumes almost everything in the house, including Jack and the cockroaches.
38a	12a	"Un-Bear-able Bears" "(Le Bal des ours)"	Olivier Jean-Marie	Michel Gaudelette	Olivier Jean-Marie	October 27, 2000
During carnival, Oggy and Jack decide to dress up in different costumes. However, the costumes soon cause a serious misunderstanding not only between the cats, but two bears as well, much to a butterfly distracting and waking up the little bear. The cockroaches decide to join by framing Oggy for hitting Jack. Even worse, the mother bear comes to Oggy's house and the cockroaches blame Oggy for flattening his teddy bear, which the mother bear believes to be the little bear. She ends up attacking Oggy, thinking that he kidnapped it.
38b	12b	"The Techno-Files" "(Vive la technique!)"	Olivier Jean-Marie	Olivier Jean-Marie	Patrick Claeys	October 20, 2000
Jack decides to help Oggy by showing him his inventions, purely designed for cockroach removal, which is overcomplex and technologically advanced versions of the flyswatter.
38c	12c	"Keep Cool!" "(Aglagla...)"	Olivier Jean-Marie	Olivier Jean-Marie	Charles Vaucelle	November 6, 2000
The cockroaches have raided Oggy's fridge in the middle of the night, but they leave the fridge door open, causing the world to freeze and go into a second ice age.
39a	13a	"The Joker Joked" "(Magicien malgré lui)"	Olivier Jean-Marie	Paul Nougha	Fred Vervisch	November 2, 2000
Oggy prepares to meet up with his girlfriend and her parents. However, a mix-up in the mail results in Oggy accidentally switching his new formal suit with a magician's suit.
39b	13b	"Saturday Black Fever" "(La Fièvre du samedi noir)"	Olivier Jean-Marie	Olivier Jean-Marie	Zyk	October 31, 2000
Oggy strikes oil while gardening so he can earn a big profit. After the cockroaches get back from their vacation, they notice all the pipes. Joey then gets a $100 bill and gets it on fire. To add injury to insult, a drop of oil lands on it. And the predictable result occurs.
39c	13c	"Green Peace" "(Noël au balcon, pactisons!)"	Olivier Jean-Marie	Olivier Jean-Marie	Olivier Jean-Marie	November 3, 2000
Oggy attempts to get a pine tree ready in time for Christmas, despite a dispute involving his inner-angel and inner-demon. To add insult to injury, the cockroaches join forces with Oggy's inner-demon to destroy all of the trees Oggy prepares for Christmas time.
40a	14a	"Face Off" "(Nouveau Nez)"	Olivier Jean-Marie	Paul Nougha	Fred Vervisch	December 6, 2000
When Oggy gets his original face anviled by another prank of the cockroaches, Jack decides to take him to get plastic surgery. The cockroaches' intervention leads to incorrect and bizarre facial reconstructions.
40b	14b	"Walls Have Ears" "(Oggy passe-muraille)"	Olivier Jean-Marie	François Rosso	François Rosso	November 30, 2000
While fixing the TV antenna on the roof, Oggy gets hit by a lightning bolt, granting him the ability to pass through anything like a ghost. He starts using this ability for various antics. However, the cockroaches soon turn the tables against him.
40c	14c	"Sleepless Night" "(Nuit blanche)"	Olivier Jean-Marie	Olivier Jean-Marie	Arnold Gransac	November 9, 2000
Oggy returns home after a night out with Jack and only wants to go to sleep, but the cockroaches have other ideas, deciding to keep him awake until the morning.
41a	15a	"Off Limits" "(Défense d'entrer)"	Olivier Jean-Marie	François Rosso	François Rosso	December 8, 2000
The cockroaches move into Bob's home, taking Oggy's TV, fridge, and money with them. After reasoning fails him, Oggy decides to win back his possessions by force.
41b	15b	"The Pied Bagpiper" "(La Cornemuse enchantée)"	Olivier Jean-Marie	Olivier Jean-Marie	François Rosso	November 7, 2000
As Oggy encounters Nessie in his swimming pool, Dee Dee, whose fridge was eaten by the monster, tries to get rid of it by all means, at all costs, leaving Marky and Joey confused.
41c	15c	"Lost in Space" "(Le Silence de l'espace)"	Olivier Jean-Marie	Olivier Jean-Marie	Charles Vaucelle	October 12, 2000
While Oggy is on the duty of looking after a large space station, the cockroaches have come aboard to cause their usual mischief in the dark depths of the final frontier.
42a	16a	"Paper Chase" "(Format A4)"	Olivier Jean-Marie	Olivier Jean-Marie	Patrick Claeys	December 19, 2000
Another series of cockroach pranks results in Oggy falling into a photocopier, trapping him inside a piece of paper.
42b	16b	"Penalty Shot" "(Penalty)"	Olivier Jean-Marie	Olivier Jean-Marie	Christophe Ollivier	December 20, 2000
After watching a soccer match on TV, Joey asks Dee Dee and Marky to seek out places to play soccer, eventually using Jack's body as a soccer pitch and inviting several insects to play with them.
42c	16c	"Oggy's Puzzled" "(Paisible Puzzle)"	Olivier Jean-Marie	Michel Gaudelette	François Rosso	December 22, 2000
Oggy's attempt at finishing a massive jigsaw puzzle starts to go to pieces when Joey steals the final piece.
43a	17a	"The Pumpkin That Pretended to Be a Ferrari" "(La Citrouille qui se prenait pour une Ferrari)"	Olivier Jean-Marie	Olivier Jean-Marie	Olivier Jean-Marie	December 14, 2000
While returning home from shopping, Oggy accidentally runs over a frog, then tries to kiss it. However, he soon learns this frog is actually a fairy, who decides to make a van out of his shopping bag. Seeing this, Jack decides to find another frog or fairy to go to the disco.
43b	17b	"Going Up" "(Étages mécaniques)"	Olivier Jean-Marie	Olivier Jean-Marie	Charles Vaucelle	January 6, 2001
Because the stairs at his house are too long, Oggy decides to buy an elevator for making it easier to go to the second floor. Later, one elevator is not enough so Oggy buys more elevators to go to other floors and areas of his house. However, thanks to the cockroaches' antics, everything goes out of control.
43c	17c	"Don't Rock the Cradle!" "(Objectif Nounou)"	Olivier Jean-Marie	Olivier Jean-Marie	Thomas Szabo	January 8, 2001
Oggy is left to look after Monica's baby cousin while she and Jack go on a trip. However, the cockroaches plan on making this babysitting job a challenge, as Joey plans to kidnap the baby for ransom.
44a	18a	"Pharonuf" "(Le Secret de la pyramide)"	Olivier Jean-Marie	Olivier Jean-Marie	Olivier Jean-Marie	January 11, 2001
Oggy and Jack's trip in Egypt takes the usual twist when the cockroaches show up to cause mayhem. However, the chase takes the cockroaches and Oggy into a time vortex inside a pyramid, transporting them back to the ancient Egyptian time period, where Oggy becomes a slave and the cockroaches are hailed as sacred royalty.
44b	18b	"Sitcom"	Olivier Jean-Marie	Olivier Jean-Marie	Thomas Szabo	January 15, 2001
After Oggy is watching a TV sitcom, the cockroaches trick on him with a tape recording of a laugh track. The recording ends up in Oggy's stomach, involuntarily activating while Jack and Monica get into an argument.
44c	18c	"Homebreaker" "(Chacun chez soi)"	Olivier Jean-Marie	François Rosso	François Rosso	January 17, 2001
After his home gets destroyed, Bob forcefully moves into Oggy's house for a temporary stay.
45a	19a	"Magic Carpet Ride" "(Les Milles et Une Peurs)"	Olivier Jean-Marie	Olivier Jean-Marie	Jean-Christophe Dessaint	January 23, 2001
Oggy buys a new carpet, which turns out to be a flying one. When the cockroaches tie explosives to it, the carpet goes out of control. Because of this, Jack must save Oggy, who cannot control the carpet.
45b	19b	"Flower Power" "(Le Poids des mots)"	Olivier Jean-Marie	Olivier Jean-Marie	François Rosso	January 29, 2001
Oggy finds a book on flower power and decides to become a hippie. The cockroaches, confused by the situation, try to provoke him into losing his temper, but to little avail.
45c	19c	"Safari, So Good..." "(Safari-Golade)"	Olivier Jean-Marie	Olivier Jean-Marie	Charles Vaucelle	January 25, 2001
Oggy and Jack go on a trip to Africa, with Dee Dee trying to ruin the trip. However, chimpanzees steal their safari truck, leaving Oggy and Jack to devise several ways to try to escape the African wilderness.
46a	20a	"Joey and the Magic Bean" "(Un problème de taille)"	Olivier Jean-Marie	Olivier Jean-Marie	Thomas Szabo	January 25, 2001
During nighttime, a mysterious green giant comes to Oggy's neighborhood and Joey meets with him. He gives Joey a can of magic beans, which makes Joey grow bigger when he eats them. Joey spends all night trying to grow tall enough to scare Oggy, but no matter how tall he grows, he is still shorter than him.
46b	20b	"Control Freak" "(Enroule du câble)"	Olivier Jean-Marie	Olivier Jean-Marie	Olivier Jean-Marie	January 26, 2001
Oggy and Jack have a motorcycle race in order to decide who can use the TV's remote-control.
46c	20c	"What a Dump!" "(Poubelle Story)"	Olivier Jean-Marie	Nicolas Gallet	François Rosso	January 31, 2001
Oggy's latest attempt at removing the cockroaches results in them taking a one-way ticket to the landfill.
47a	21a	"Sea Risks..." "(Il était un petit navire)"	Olivier Jean-Marie	Olivier Jean-Marie	Charles Vaucelle	February 6, 2001
Oggy, Jack, and Dee Dee are left stranded in the middle of the ocean on a lifeboat following a shipwreck. Jack tries to find a way out while Oggy can only think about one thing, and one only: food.
47b	21b	"Mission to Earth" "(Les Envahisseurs)"	Olivier Jean-Marie	Olivier Jean-Marie	François Rosso	February 14, 2001
Oggy and Joey unwittingly catapult themselves to Mars, and later see a spaceship preparing for an invasion of Earth by aliens disguised as garden gnomes. With the imperative being obvious, they sabotage the gnome-aliens' plans together.
47c	21c	"Oggy's Bag" "(Oggy Bag)"	Olivier Jean-Marie	Nicolas Gallet	Lionel Allaix	March 1, 2001
As Oggy chases the cockroaches into his dirty laundry bag, they find out that the bag contains a world of its own.
48a	22a	"Jack in a Box" "(La Machine)"	Olivier Jean-Marie	Michel Gaudelette	Zyk	April 10, 2001
Jack shows Oggy a machine that can transform objects into other things; for example: transforming a cow into dairy products and beef products. However, when the cockroaches throw Jack into the machine, Oggy makes his attempt to save him, even if it costs him his physical form.
48b	22b	"A Tooth for a Tooth" "(Dent pour dent)"	Olivier Jean-Marie	François Rosso	François Rosso	April 23, 2001
The cockroaches are pulling yet another prank on Oggy, putting a large, fake teeth in his mouth. Oggy first try to ask his neighbor Bob for help, but he violently refuses, forcing Oggy to call Jack in order to get rid of his oversized teeth.
48c	22c	"The Blob" "(Mon ami le blob)"	Olivier Jean-Marie	Nicolas Gallet	Jean-Christophe Dessaint	April 30, 2001
After Oggy receives a lava lamp from the post, the cockroaches release the blob, which then starts growing and eating anything in its path.
49a	23a	"Upside Down" "(Sens dessus-dessous)"	Olivier Jean-Marie	Olivier Jean-Marie	Charles Vaucelle	April 28, 2001
During a stormy day that leads to Oggy nailing all furnitures to the floor, the house gets blown away, landing upside down on top of a tree.
49b	23b	"Barbecue" "(Le Barbecue)"	Olivier Jean-Marie	Michel Gaudelette	Lionel Allaix	April 24, 2001
Oggy is enjoying a barbecue in his garden and Jack is unsuccessfully trying to fly a kite. When Jack gets wrapped in the line the cockroaches are using for their tennis ball, he starts a mayhem which soon escalates and involves all of them, including Bob and a hawk living in Oggy's tree.
49c	23c	"Boxing Fever" "(Le Match)"	Olivier Jean-Marie	Michel Gaudelette	François Rosso	May 2, 2001
Due to another of the cockroaches' antics, Bob challenges Oggy to a boxing match. Oggy calls Jack in order to get some help in training for the match.
50a	24a	"Baby Boum" "(Un petit nid douillet)"	Olivier Jean-Marie	Nicolas Gallet	Charles Vaucelle	September 30, 2001
As a stork comes to town and brings babies, Oggy decides to dump a baby in Bob's garden. However, this results in an all-out infant battle between Oggy and Bob, where both are trying different methods of dumping the babies in the opponent's garden. At the end, Bob calls the stork again to bring a lot of babies in Oggy's garden.
50b	24b	"Oggy Has Kittens" "(L'Apprentissage de la vie)"	Olivier Jean-Marie	Olivier Jean-Marie	Thomas Szabo	May 7, 2001
Oggy adopts a kitten after the cockroaches pretend to bark like a dog to make it appear. Much to Jack's confusion, Oggy is willing to teach the kitten the proper cat etiquette.
50c	24c	"Up to... No Good!" "(Le Septième Ciel)"	Olivier Jean-Marie	Nicolas Gallet	François Rosso	June 22, 2001
While having a roast chicken cooked, Oggy finds a switch in his garden, which unveils a skinny tall mountain from underneath his house.
51a	25a	"Sky Diving" "(Chute libre)"	Olivier Jean-Marie	Olivier Jean-Marie	Olivier Jean-Marie	May 4, 2001
When Jack is about to propose to Monica, she decides to take up skydiving, taking both Oggy and Jack with her. However, Dee Dee tags along and decides to make the stunt harder for Jack.
51b	25b	"Brainchild" "(Le Petit Génie)"	Olivier Jean-Marie	Olivier Jean-Marie	Lionel Allaix	September 1, 2001
Oggy encounters a small, fat child sitting on the street and typing with a laptop. As the child decides to follow Oggy home, he starts performing very strange experiments on the cockroaches.
51c	25c	"Welcome to Paris!" "(Ça c'est Paris!)"	Olivier Jean-Marie	Olivier Jean-Marie	Olivier Jean-Marie	April 5, 2003
Oggy's trip in Paris goes wrong when the cockroaches somehow hitch a ride. The chase starts at the Eiffel Tower and goes all the way to Notre-Dame de Paris until Oggy is arrested.
52a	26a	"Black & White" "(Lessivés)"	Olivier Jean-Marie	Olivier Jean-Marie	François Rosso	August 28, 2002
While Oggy is trying a new, super-strong detergent, the cockroaches decide to fill the washing machine to the brim with it, causing the washing machine to cover Oggy's house with pink foam. As a raincloud washes it off, everything around Oggy's house has lost its colors, making Oggy depressed.
52b	26b	"Strike!" "(Le Bowling)"	Olivier Jean-Marie	Michel Gaudelette	Lionel Allaix	September 25, 2002
The cockroaches' game of pick-up sticks is interrupted by Oggy, who is bowling. However, when Jack comes over, a chase begins, leading both cats to a real bowling alley, and ending with an explosion that destroys it.
52c	26c	"Chatter Box" "(Les Pipelettes)"	Olivier Jean-Marie	Olivier Jean-Marie	François Rosso	April 5, 2003
Out of pure curiosity, Oggy buys a type of crackers that causes anyone who eats them to speak nonstop in gibberish. Dee Dee also tries one out and gains the ability to speak in gibberish, but Joey and Marky are not impressed by his verbal skills. When Jack also eats one of the crackers, Dee Dee and Jack can talk to each other.

=== Season 3 (2008) ===
No. overall	No. in season	Title (French title bottom)	Directed by	Story by	Storyboard by	Original release date	Revised air date
53a	1a	"Octopus"	Olivier Jean-Marie	Hugo Gittard	Hugo Gittard	October 18, 2008	TBA
Oggy befriends an octopus which the cockroaches want to eat. However, Oggy does not know that this octopus makes a habit of robbery. Beginning with this episode, all characters have been redesigned with new voices, sounds, facial expressions, as well as music. Canal+ Family aired this episode until season 4's finale.
53b	1b	"Sheepcat" "(Chat de Berger)"	Olivier Jean-Marie	Hugo Gittard	Hugo Gittard	October 19, 2008	September 14, 2018
Oggy goes to the mountains to look after a sheep flock while the sheepdog leaves on vacation. As the cockroaches sneak into his luggage to come along, they become the shepherd's friends, and Oggy soon becomes the sheep's scapegoat.
53c	1c	"Night Watchmen" "(Gardiens de Nuit)"	Olivier Jean-Marie	Hugo Gittard	Hugo Gittard	October 20, 2008	September 11, 2018
Oggy and Jack get a job as night watchmen in a chemical factory, but their job was ruined by the cockroaches.
54a	2a	"Abandoned Cockroaches" "(Cafards Abandonnés)"	Olivier Jean-Marie	Hugo Gittard	Hugo Gittard	October 21, 2008	July 17, 2018
On a road trip heading toward the beach, the cockroaches make a huge mess in the back seat. When Oggy and Jack stop for gas, they abandon the cockroaches on the highway rest area.
54b	2b	"V.I.P Party" "(La Vie de Château)"	Olivier Jean-Marie	Hugo Gittard	Hugo Gittard	October 22, 2008	September 18, 2018
Oggy is invited to a jet-set party at Lord Latouille's castle, where Lord Latouille introduces him to other guests as "Oggy, the famous cartoon hero", but nobody cares. Hearing that, Oggy discreetly goes to the buffet to cheer himself up, where he finds the cockroaches.
54c	2c	"Scuba Diving" "(Le Gros Bleu)"	Olivier Jean-Marie	Olivier Jean-Marie	Guillaume Le bois	October 23, 2008	TBA
When Oggy and Jack take up scuba diving in Hawaii during their vacation, the cockroaches tag along and take the plunge to cause mischief, including drawing a man's body.
55a	3a	"Oggy and the Magic Shoes" "(Oggy et les Chaussures Magiques)"	Olivier Jean-Marie	Olivier Jean-Marie	Olivier Jean-Marie	October 24, 2008	TBA
On his way home, Oggy comes across a pair of magic shoes that can dance on their own whenever spit-shined. After taming them, he soon becomes famous with the toe tappers; all goes well until the cockroaches try to take advantage of his newfound popularity.
55b	3b	"Casino"	Olivier Jean-Marie	Hugo Gittard	Fred Mintoff	October 25, 2008	TBA
After Oggy receives his 1 million € payment, Jack spends it all on a casino joint in Las Vegas and play poker against a man. However, while they play seriously, the cockroaches come along to steal the cards.
55c	3c	"Santa Oggy" "(Oggy Prend les Rennes)"	Olivier Jean-Marie	Hugo Gittard	Hugo Gittard	October 26, 2008	TBA
Right in the middle of this Christmas night while doing his routine gift delivery services, Santa Claus gets disabled by cockroach-related technical difficulties, so Oggy volunteers to do his job for him.
56a	4a	"Just Married!" "(Vive les Mariés!!)"	Olivier Jean-Marie	Hugo Gittard	Fred Mintoff	October 27, 2008	TBA
Oggy is invited to the wedding party of his cousin, Jack, and a French poodle, promising to be cockroach-free. Without notice, the cockroaches come along for the wedding to cause trouble.
56b	4b	"Living Carrots!" "(Carottes Vivantes!)"	Olivier Jean-Marie	Olivier Jean-Marie	Thierry Gérard	October 28, 2008	TBA
As Oggy discovers that all of the vegetables in his house are alive, the vegetables are saved. When Oggy gets hungry, they decide to change Oggy into a predator.
56c	4c	"First Flight" "(Baptême de l'Air)"	Olivier Jean-Marie	Hugo Gittard	Jean-Luc Abiven	October 28, 2008	TBA
Jack is preparing a biplane flight, but Oggy gets on the wrong flight with the cockroaches as the pilots.
57a	5a	"Trans-Amazonian" "(Transamazonienne)"	Olivier Jean-Marie	Olivier Jean-Marie	François Reczulski	October 31, 2008	TBA
During a trip to the Amazon rainforest, Oggy and Jack run into friendly insectivore native inhabitants, who accidentally make Jack unconscious in which the cockroaches take advantage of.
57b	5b	"Castaway Cats" "(Les Naufragés)"	Olivier Jean-Marie	Hugo Gittard	Thomas Szabo	November 1, 2008	TBA
Oggy and Jack fall overboard on their cruise ship and land on an island. While Oggy is enjoying himself, Jack is trying to escape, with the cockroaches being kidnapped by a roach eater and his pet. Note: As a quick referential gag, a character from the Space Goofs episode "Space Sailors" (which aired a few years before this) appears in this episode.
57c	5c	"Invincible"	Olivier Jean-Marie	Hugo Gittard	François Reczulski	October 28, 2008	TBA
After being run over by a car, Oggy discovers that he has superpowers, and Jack becomes his sidekick in order to protect the world from evil. However, they always get into trouble (especially Jack).
58a	6a	"Inside Out" "(Volte Face)"	Olivier Jean-Marie	Olivier Jean-Marie	François Reczulski	November 3, 2008	October 12, 2018
Due to the magical powers of a witch's spyglass, the roles of the household inhabitants are reversed: the cockroaches are as big as Oggy while the cats become as small as the cockroaches. As the cockroaches end up shrinking Jack and Bob as well, they try to get themselves back in order to restore their normal size.
58b	6b	"Priceless Roaches" "(Tribulations en Chine)"	Olivier Jean-Marie	Olivier Jean-Marie	Thierry Gérard	November 6, 2008	TBA
Because the cockroaches make mishief during a trip to China, Oggy sells them to a Chinese merchant, but starts to think that he made the wrong decision. As Oggy rescues them, the people start chasing him, thinking that he is a thief.
58c	6c	"The World Underneath" "(Le Monde du Dessous)"	Olivier Jean-Marie	Olivier Jean-Marie	Thomas Szabo	November 7, 2008	TBA
After the cockroaches traps him under the house as Oggy tries to catch fried chicken, Oggy soon finds out that the floor contains a world of its own, and meets a group of pale bugs. Seeing this, Jack invents a robot and makes the cockroaches go down to save him.
59a	7a	"Golden Eggs" "(Papa Poule)"	Olivier Jean-Marie	Olivier Jean-Marie	François Reczulski	November 4, 2008	TBA
While doing laundry, Oggy discovers a chicken that can lay golden eggs. When Joey learns of this, he tries to get one of its eggs for profit.
59b	7b	"Termite-Ator" "(Opération Termites)"	Olivier Jean-Marie	Hugo Gittard	Fred Mintoff	November 7, 2008	TBA
The cockroaches hire a termite to help them get in the cupboards. However, it causes problems for Oggy and Jack.
59c	7c	"The Mini Golf War" "(La Guerre du Mini Golf)"	Olivier Jean-Marie	Hugo Gittard	François Reczulski	November 19, 2008	TBA
Oggy and Jack are playing mini golf in Oggy's yard. The cockroaches show up to cause trouble for Jack, while Oggy keeps getting a perfect score.
60a	8a	"Oggywood"	Olivier Jean-Marie	Olivier Jean-Marie	François Reczulski	November 19, 2008	TBA
While exploring Hollywood, Los Angeles, the cockroaches try to disturb Oggy, which leads to several movie scene parodies.
60b	8b	"Horse Ride" "(En Selle!)"	Olivier Jean-Marie	Olivier Jean-Marie	François Reczulski	November 21, 2008	TBA
As Jack brings Oggy a horse for a horse show, Oggy plans on getting famous for riding it, but the horse soon becomes a show that only the cockroaches can enjoy.
60c	8c	"Oggy's Crab" "(Le Crabe d'Oggy)"	Olivier Jean-Marie	Olivier Jean-Marie	François Reczulski	December 21, 2008	TBA
Oggy adopts a crab, knowing that it keeps the cockroaches away. However, much to his dismay, it soon clings on Oggy.
61a	9a	"The Fugitive" "(Le Fugitif)"	Olivier Jean-Marie	Hugo Gittard	Fred Mintoff	November 5, 2008	TBA
After catching him in the fridge, Oggy "kills" Dee Dee, not realizing that Dee Dee is just playing dead. As a result, Joey and Marky call a crime inspector to make this worse for Oggy so the police will arrest him.
61b	9b	"Locked Outside" "(Enfermé Dehors)"	Olivier Jean-Marie	Olivier Jean-Marie	François Reczulski	November 12, 2008	TBA
The cockroaches lock Oggy out of his house. Now Oggy must find a way back in before his house is trashed.
61c	9c	"The Ancestor" "(L'Ancêtre)"	Olivier Jean-Marie	Hugo Gittard	Fred Mintoff	November 20, 2008	TBA
Oggy finds a prehistoric form of a cockroach frozen in a cave under his garden. The cockroaches unfreeze him, later finding out that he is Joey's ancestor.
62a	10a	"Surf's On" "(Les Princes de la Glisse)"	Olivier Jean-Marie	Olivier Jean-Marie	Francois Reczulski	November 22, 2008	July 10, 2018
Oggy and Jack are on a beach to go surfing. Jack is a surf but Oggy gets swept away by the waves and runs on the shore. As he comes to help, the cats start surfing together this time, but the cockroaches show up.
62b	10b	"Hold Up!" "(Qui Veut Voler des Millions?)"	Olivier Jean-Marie	Olivier Jean-Marie	Jean-Luc Abiven	November 23, 2008	November 24, 2017
Oggy has found a new job: a warehouseman at the Banque de France, where he volunteers to unload a truck full of bills by using a hand truck. He needs to figure out how to use the hand truck first, which is not an easy task.
62c	10c	"Fancy a Pizza" "(Rapid'zza)"	Olivier Jean-Marie	Hugo Gittard	Fred Mintoff	November 24, 2008	TBA
Jack opens up a pizza delivering business with Oggy being the pizza delivery boy. As Jack commands him to deliver it to Bob, Oggy's job becomes difficult once the cockroaches steal his pizza for Bob.
63a	11a	"Oggy's Grandma" "(La Mamie d'Oggy)"	Olivier Jean-Marie	Olivier Jean-Marie	Fred Mintoff	November 25, 2008	TBA
As Oggy's grandmother returns, she drinks a coffee, making her super strong against the cockroaches. However, Oggy does not notice it.
63b	11b	"Cartoon Lesson" "(Leçon de Cartoon)"	Olivier Jean-Marie	Olivier Jean-Marie	François Reczulski	December 22, 2008	TBA
While watching a 1950s cartoon based on Looney Tunes, Oggy is disturbed by the cockroaches. As he chases the cockroaches, he gets stuck in the projector's rope tied by Joey, causing the four of them to get electrocuted for moments, then get transported in the projector. Oggy soon finds the characters want to teach him a little something about cartoons.
63c	11c	"Ugly, Dirty and Good" "(Affreux, Sale et Gentil)"	Olivier Jean-Marie	Olivier Jean-Marie	Fred Mintoff	December 23, 2008	TBA
Seeing Joey being hit on Oggy's hat and treating him like a father, Marky and Dee Dee must try to change him back to normal.
64a	12a	"Moving Out" "(3 Pièces Cuisine)"	Olivier Jean-Marie	Olivier Jean-Marie	Thierry Beurcq	December 24, 2008	TBA
Tired of dealing with the cockroaches, Oggy decides to move out to an apartment in the city. Feeling sad and lonely, the cockroaches try to look for him, but when they show up in his new apartment room, the city tells there is not enough room for them.
64b	12b	"To Serve and Protect" "(Police Académie)"	Olivier Jean-Marie	Hugo Gittard	Thierry Beurcq	December 24, 2008	TBA
As Oggy and Jack attend Bob's police training camp, the cockroaches sabotage Jack's every task and make Oggy win.
64c	12c	"Deep Trouble" "(Péril au Périscope)"	Olivier Jean-Marie	Olivier Jean-Marie	François Reczulski	December 24, 2008	TBA
Oggy and Jack climb aboard on a submarine, but the cockroaches come and take over the entire ship.
65a	13a	"The Cicada and the Cockroach" "(La Cigale et le Cafard)"	Olivier Jean-Marie	Olivier Jean-Marie	Fred Mintoff	December 24, 2008	TBA
Oggy finds a cicada hoping to use its sound effect for relaxation, not realizing that it gives Joey quite a headache.
65b	13b	"Oggy's Double" "(Le Sosie d'Oggy)"	Olivier Jean-Marie	Olivier Jean-Marie	Fred Mintoff	December 24, 2008	TBA
Oggy finds another cat that is a doppelgänger of himself, except that it has a white spot on its tail. Seeing the situation, Jack decides to play a joke on the cockroaches making them think that Oggy is everywhere.
65c	13c	"Formula 1" "(Formule 1)"	Olivier Jean-Marie	Olivier Jean-Marie	François Reczulski	December 24, 2008	TBA
Jack invites Oggy to see him participate as a racer in the big racing tournament being hosted at the circuit arena. When the cockroaches come with the cats to get their race on havoc-wreaking bug car, things go too far during the tournament.

=== Season 4 (2012–13) ===
No. overall	No. in season	Title (French title bottom)	Directed by	Story by	Storyboard by	Original release date	US air date
66a	1a	"Olivia"	Olivier Jean-Marie	Olivier Jean-Marie	Charles Vaucelle	January 2, 2012	February 23, 2015
When a new female cat named Olivia moves into Oggy's neighborhood, he instantly falls in love with her. However, when Jack and Bob prepare a welcome party for her, the cockroaches are determined to ruin Oggy's chances.
66b	1b	"The Lighthouse Keeper" "(Oggy Gardien de Phare)"	Olivier Jean-Marie	Olivier Jean-Marie	Julien Thompson	February 10, 2012	February 23, 2015
Oggy and Jack become lighthouse keepers for the day, but Jack has a fear of heights and the cockroaches want to cause trouble.
66c	1c	"Dump the Roaches!" "(Les Cafards à la Poubelle)"	Olivier Jean-Marie	Olivier Jean-Marie	Charles Vaucelle	May 11, 2012	February 24, 2015
Oggy and a sleep deprived Jack become garbage men.
67a	2a	"Dee Dee's Diet" "(Le Régime de Dee Dee)"	Olivier Jean-Marie	Olivier Jean-Marie	Alexandre Viano	May 18, 2012	March 17, 2015
Dee Dee thinks he is too fat so he decides to go on a diet, but Oggy is trying to sabotage his diet.
67b	2b	"A Jealous Guy" "(Jaloux comme un Chat)"	Olivier Jean-Marie	Olivier Jean-Marie	Julien Thompson	June 1, 2012	February 24, 2015
During a day in the yard, Joey manipulates three photos in order to trick Oggy into believing that he is dating Olivia. Seeing those photos, Oggy becomes jealous and begins to act very strangely.
67c	2c	"Let's Party, Guys!" "(Un Fête D'Enfer!)"	Olivier Jean-Marie	Olivier Jean-Marie	Fred Mintoff	June 15, 2012	March 18, 2015
With Joey's birthday coming up, Marky and Dee Dee decide to throw a surprise party for him. They make an invitation and over 100 cockroaches show up the next day. Oggy is helpless against them so he calls Jack, who show up with two cockroaches exterminator outfits. While Oggy's house is cleaned, they celebrate a small birthday party for Joey inside the tent with just the cats and cockroaches in attendance.
68a	3a	"Airship House" "(La maison dirigeable)"	Olivier Jean-Marie	Olivier Jean-Marie	Julien Thompson	July 15, 2012	March 19, 2015
After Oggy gets everything ready for Jack's birthday party, the cockroaches blow up all the balloons with helium and release them in the attic, making the house fly into the city.
68b	3b	"Panic Room" "(Haute sécurité)"	Olivier Jean-Marie	Olivier Jean-Marie	Alexandre Viano	July 20, 2012	February 25, 2015
Tired of watching the cockroaches' practical jokes, Oggy locks himself in a CCTV room where he can activate various traps he has set all over the house.
68c	3c	"Into the Wild" "(Randonnée sauvage)"	Olivier Jean-Marie	Olivier Jean-Marie	Charles Vaucelle	July 26, 2012	March 20, 2015
As Oggy and Jack go hiking on the GR 20 trail across the island of Corsica, the cockroaches sabotage Jack's compass and the two cats get lost in the wild, which turns out to be pretty frightening.
69a	4a	"Washing Day" "(Discorde à linge)"	Olivier Jean-Marie	Olivier Jean-Marie	Fred Mintoff	August 18, 2012	February 25, 2015
Oggy has just washed his clothes and is about to dry them. However, the cockroaches come up and steal the clothes, starting a battle between them on the clotheslines.
69b	4b	"Lightning Visit" "(La visite)"	Olivier Jean-Marie	Olivier Jean-Marie	Florent Remize	August 25, 2012	March 18, 2015
As Oggy's parents arrive at Oggy's house for a visit, he is determined protect them from the cockroaches.
69c	4c	"Oggy's Shadow" "(L'ombre d'Oggy)"	Olivier Jean-Marie	Olivier Jean-Marie	Julien Thompson	September 1, 2012	February 26, 2015
The cockroaches have trapped Oggy with lights and nailed his shadow as they are about to raid the fridge. When Oggy breaks free, his shadow is still trapped but becomes stray.
70a	5a	"Buddy Parrot" "(Alerte à l'ara)"	Olivier Jean-Marie	Olivier Jean-Marie	Fred Mintoff	September 9, 2012	February 26, 2015
Oggy finds a parrot which repeats anything he says and does, and decides to take it home. Seeing this, Dee Dee becomes very obsessed with the parrot, and wants to get its feathers only for food.
70b	5b	"The Magic Pen" "(Crayon magique)"	Olivier Jean-Marie	Olivier Jean-Marie	Julien Thompson	September 30, 2012	February 27, 2015
As a pencil with a magical drawing ability has just fallen onto Oggy's house yard, the cockroaches plan to use it against Oggy.
70c	5c	"The Cube" "(Le Cube)"	Olivier Jean-Marie	Olivier Jean-Marie	Julien Thompson	October 1, 2012	February 27, 2015
Oggy finds a metal cube on his yard and decides to take it to his living room. Soon, the cube causes trouble for his friends as it grows bigger until it entrances him.
71a	6a	"A Charming Guy" "(Le Séducteur)"	Olivier Jean-Marie	Olivier Jean-Marie	Alexandre Viano	October 2, 2012	March 2, 2015
As Oggy has problems expressing his feelings for Olivia, the cockroaches come along to ruin it, such as recording a video of Oggy kissing Jack.
71b	6b	"Fly for Fun" "(Des pales pour Oggy)"	Olivier Jean-Marie	Olivier Jean-Marie	Stéphane Annette	October 3, 2012	March 2, 2015
When a helicopter lands on Oggy's yard, Oggy decides to take control of it for a while. Suddenly, Joey falls in love with the helicopter, thinking that it is a giant dragonfly, leaving Dee Dee and Marky confused.
71c	6c	"Olivia's Pimple" "(La guerre du bouton)"	Olivier Jean-Marie	Olivier Jean-Marie	Céline Gobinet	October 6, 2012	March 10, 2015
Olivia notices a pimple on her face and refuses to leave her house.
72a	7a	"The Ice Rink" "(La patinoire)"	Olivier Jean-Marie	Olivier Jean-Marie	Fred Mintoff	October 8, 2012	March 3, 2015
Bob crashes into a fire hydrant when it turns ice in winter, making Oggy's yard turn into a large ice rink. Oggy and Olivia decide to have some fun going skating on the rink.
72b	7b	"For Real!" "(Pour de Vrai)"	Olivier Jean-Marie	Olivier Jean-Marie	Alexandre Viano	October 13, 2012	March 4, 2015
After Joey steals Oggy's MP3 player and throws it into the wiring, they are electrocuted, causing them to turn into a realistic cat and a realistic roach respectively. With nobody recognizing them, Oggy and Joey find a way to turn themselves back to normal.
72c	7c	"Fly to the Sun" "(Destination soleil)"	Olivier Jean-Marie	Olivier Jean-Marie	Florent Remize	October 16, 2012	March 3, 2015
Following an explosion provoked by the cockroaches, they find themselves in outer space and heading straight for the sun.
73a	8a	"Run, Olivia, Run!" "(Olivia fait le marathon)"	Olivier Jean-Marie	Olivier Jean-Marie	Julien Thompson	October 28, 2012	February 23, 2015
With Olivia taking part in marathon, Oggy comes with a bag with a bottle of water inside. However, the cockroaches try to steal the bag, resulting in a big chase while the race is on.
73b	8b	"Mind the Giant!" "(Géant!)"	Olivier Jean-Marie	Olivier Jean-Marie	Fred Mintoff	November 14, 2012	February 24, 2015
Marky eats some tree seeds which make him huge, turning him into a giant cockroach.
73c	8c	"A Soft World" "(Un coup de mou)"	Olivier Jean-Marie	Olivier Jean-Marie	David Garcia	November 25, 2012	TBA
Oggy gets a package containing a spray bottle, in hopes of being able to kill the cockroaches. However, when it ends up in cockroaches' hands, they turn it into a spray bottle that makes everything soft. Seeing the situation, Oggy and Jack try to use an antidote with soap to make everything turn back solid.
74a	9a	"Sport Fans" "(Oggy Champion de Sport)"	Olivier Jean-Marie	Olivier Jean-Marie	Fred Mintoff	January 8, 2013	March 4, 2015
After Joey destroys Oggy's TV, Oggy and Jack make the cockroaches do Olympic events themselves.
74b	9b	"The Kitchen Boy" "(L'apprenti)"	Olivier Jean-Marie	Olivier Jean-Marie	Julien Thompson	April 29, 2013	TBA
Oggy gets a new job as an apprentice cook in a modern restaurant with Bob as his boss. Everything works well until the cockroaches appear to try to sabotage Oggy's work.
74c	9c	"Mister Cat" "(Mister chat)"	Olivier Jean-Marie	Olivier Jean-Marie	Alexandre Viano	May 1, 2013	February 26, 2015
Oggy is taking part of a Mister Cat contest with Bob entering his new pet cat. When it comes to the first round, Bob decides to ask help from the cockroaches to fix the contest to make sure his cat wins.
75a	10a	"The Easter Egg" "(Oggy et l'œuf de Pâques)"	Olivier Jean-Marie	Olivier Jean-Marie	Stéphane Annette	May 2, 2013	April 9, 2015
After an Easter Bell accidentally drops an Easter egg in Oggy's yard, Oggy decides to use it to impress Olivia. The cockroaches want it only for eating.
75b	10b	"Journey to the Center of the Earth" "(Oggy au centre de la Terre)"	Olivier Jean-Marie	Olivier Jean-Marie	Charles Vaucelle	May 4, 2013	February 27, 2015
After the cockroaches steal Oggy's nose, Joey and Oggy fall to the center of the earth. Worried, Dee Dee and Marky tell the situation to Olivia, and they go down to save Oggy and Joey.
75c	10c	"Butterfly Race!" "(La course aux papillons)"	Olivier Jean-Marie	Olivier Jean-Marie	Fred Mintoff	May 17, 2013	March 5, 2015
Being jealous when Oggy finds a butterfly and teaches it tricks, Bob dresses Marky up as a butterfly and the two compete in a race. Olivia makes a butterfly race in which the winner will get a trophy and honey.
76a	11a	"Oggy Goes Green!" "(Oggy tombe dans le panneau)"	Olivier Jean-Marie	Olivier Jean-Marie	Stéphane Annette	May 20, 2013	TBA
As Oggy buys a solar panel and sees its effects, he goes crazy and uses everything from solar energy. The cockroaches soon decide to use it as a weapon to chase Oggy with burning heat.
76b	11b	"Now You See Me, Now You Don't!" "(Pas vu, pas pris)"	Olivier Jean-Marie	Olivier Jean-Marie	Julien Thompson	June 1, 2013	April 9, 2015
When Oggy turns his back while fixing a vegetable juice, the cockroaches put some junk into the blender. Oggy drinks it, making him suddenly become invisible.
76c	11c	"What a Lousy Day!" "(Pas de poux pour Oggy)"	Olivier Jean-Marie	Olivier Jean-Marie	François Rosso	June 8, 2013	March 2, 2015
Oggy starts scratching his head and lends his comb to Jack and Bob. With their hair having insects inside, Olivia tries to clean them, but everything fails so they ask the cockroaches for help.
77a	12a	"Jack's Nephew" "(Le Neveu de Jack)"	Olivier Jean-Marie	Olivier Jean-Marie	Julien Thompson	June 9, 2013	February 25, 2015
Jack brings his nephew to Oggy's house and asks Oggy to look after him. However, the boy is lazy, only wanting to eat cereal for breakfast. In addition, he also makes friends with Joey, and they both start to trash the place.
77b	12b	"Roommate Wanted!" "(Le coloc)"	Olivier Jean-Marie	Olivier Jean-Marie	Stéphane Annette	June 16, 2013	March 3, 2015
Getting bored living all alone, Oggy vacuums the spare room and applies for a roommate. However, none of the people want to live with him because of the cockroaches.
77c	12c	"The Bathtub Race" "(La course aux baignoires)"	Olivier Jean-Marie	Olivier Jean-Marie	Fred Mintoff	July 1, 2013	March 4, 2015
With everyone around the neighborhood bored, Olivia decides to have a bathtub race. Oggy, Jack, and Bob sign up with their customized bathtubs while the cockroaches join in using Oggy's toilet.
78a	13a	"Inspector Dee Dee" "(Dee Dee détective)"	Olivier Jean-Marie	Olivier Jean-Marie	Pierre Violot	July 2, 2013	April 9, 2015
After Oggy returns home from shopping, he is shocked to find everything gone in his house, making him upset. With the police not knowing where those have gone, Dee Dee meets a rat under the sewer, who draws the building where his furnitures are placed. As Dee Dee walks inside the storage, he encounters an octopus, finding out that it is the culprit so they face a duel until he chases it out. At the end, he finds a truck to bring back the missing things at Oggy's house.
78b	13b	"Hep Taxi!"	Olivier Jean-Marie	Olivier Jean-Marie	François Rosso	July 5, 2013	TBA
Oggy becomes a taxi driver but the cockroaches try to sabotage the business.
78c	13c	"(Un)Happy Camper! (Note: After this episode's original American airing on Nickelodeon on March 5, 2015, it was banned from Nickelodeon's website because TMZ spotted a picture of a topless woman inside the trailer, during the scene where Oggy enters the trailer after Joey switches the oil and water signs. The picture was later replaced with a beach scene.)" "(Le chat miaule et la caravane passe)"	Olivier Jean-Marie	Olivier Jean-Marie	Stéphane Annette	July 30, 2013	March 5, 2015
Olivia and Oggy head off in their camping car for a beach vacation. However, the cockroaches come along and decide to ruin Oggy's vacation of course. The next day, Bob arrives and puts his caravan near Oggy and Olivia's caravan, making them disturbed by his furniture.
79a	14a	"A Streetcar on the Loose" "(Un Tramway Nommé Délire)"	Olivier Jean-Marie	Olivier Jean-Marie	Charles Vaucelle	August 18, 2013	TBA
Jack has become the driver of a new tram that runs through the neighbourhood. As Olivia brings some children for a ride, the cockroaches slip into the machine.
79b	14b	"Grease-Monkey Oggy" "(Contrôle technique)"	Olivier Jean-Marie	Olivier Jean-Marie	Alexandre Viano	August 20, 2013	TBA
Jack opens up a garage with fuel pumps, a hoist and every modern car fixing gadget, and allows Oggy to work as a mechanic while he is relaxing. Oggy has to fix Bob's car while the cockroaches wreak havoc.
79c	14c	"Farmer for a Day" "(Campagne pour tout le monde)"	Olivier Jean-Marie	Olivier Jean-Marie	Fred Mintoff	August 21, 2013	March 6, 2015
When Olivia takes Oggy to an old farm, Oggy starts having an unusual experience with the animals until the cockroaches approach them.
80a	15a	"Oggy Splits Hairs" "(Atouts tifs)"	Olivier Jean-Marie	Olivier Jean-Marie	Charles Vaucelle	August 25, 2013	March 9, 2015
When Oggy and Jack open up a salon, they get a task to design Bob's hair like what he wants. However, the cockroaches are here to mess up the work, including cutting Bob's fur to make him famous.
80b	15b	"Little Tom Oggy" "(Oggy Petit Poucet)"	Olivier Jean-Marie	Olivier Jean-Marie	François Rosso	August 26, 2013	March 9, 2015
Returning home from shopping, Oggy gets lost in the neighborhood and is now confused to see which way to go. He tries to leave a trail by dropping some food, but Dee Dee eats all of it.
80c	15c	"Don't Barge In!" "(Au fil de l'eau)"	Olivier Jean-Marie	Olivier Jean-Marie	François Rosso	August 30, 2013	March 10, 2015
While Oggy is on a boat ride with Olivia and the cockroaches, Bob signals Oggy to stop, but Oggy is confused with his signals and ends up bumping into him. The cockroaches try to race back to the boat.
81a	16a	"Artsy Oggy" "(De l'art ou du cochon)"	Olivier Jean-Marie	Olivier Jean-Marie	Fred Mintoff	2013	TBA
Oggy is painting a portrait of his tree in his yard. However, the cockroaches snatch it up and sabotage the painting, which a critic really enjoys.
81b	16b	"A Five-Legged Sheep" "(Le mouton à 5 pattes)"	Olivier Jean-Marie	Olivier Jean-Marie	François Rosso	2013	March 10, 2015
Oggy finds a five-legged sheep in front of his yard, not knowing it is astray. He decides to keep it for a while until the cockroaches come along for the ride.
81c	16c	"Oggy and the Magic Smile" "(Oggy et le Sourire Magique)"	Olivier Jean-Marie	Olivier Jean-Marie	Fred Mintoff	2013	March 5, 2015
Oggy buys a magic smile from the magic shop and wears it turn into a muscular tough man.
82a	17a	"Water Sports" "(Oggy fait des vagues)"	Olivier Jean-Marie	Olivier Jean-Marie	Stéphane Annette	2013	March 11, 2015
During holiday at a waterpark, the cockroaches wreak havoc fiddling around with the wave-making machine and cranking it to max, then changing the course of a waterslide.
82b	17b	"Caviar on the House!" "(Caviar pour tout le monde)"	Olivier Jean-Marie	Olivier Jean-Marie	François Rosso	2013	March 11, 2015
Oggy decides to buy some caviar to impress Olivia. However, he only has enough money to buy one little fish egg. Marky also tries to get the egg to make Joey and Dee Dee proud.
82c	17c	"Party Pooper" "(La boum)"	Olivier Jean-Marie	Olivier Jean-Marie	Pierre Violot	2013	TBA
Oggy decides to throw a private party just for Olivia and try to seduce her. However, everything goes out of his expectation when Jack and Bob come.
83a	18a	"Scaredy-Cat" "(Même Pas Peur)"	Olivier Jean-Marie	Olivier Jean-Marie	Andrés Fernandez	2013	TBA
While Oggy is busy sculpting a pumpkin to put in the window on Halloween, Jack is trying on his most horrible costumes. To make matters worse, a swamp monster accidentally comes to Oggy's house and gets lost, even eating Joey and Dee Dee.
83b	18b	"North-Pole Panic" "(Panique au pole-nord)"	Olivier Jean-Marie	Olivier Jean-Marie	Fred Mintoff	2013	TBA
The cockroaches disguise themselves in a penguin costume to kidnap Santa Claus, so an elf commissions Oggy, Olivia, and Jack to venture to the North Pole and save him and the Christmas holidays. Note: This is a double-length episode.
84a	19a	"Skate Fever" "(Skate Attitude)"	Olivier Jean-Marie	Olivier Jean-Marie	Julien Daubas	2013	March 12, 2015
Oggy finds a skateboard in the street. After a disastrous start, he begins to get the hang of it and really enjoy. He even builds a skate park at home by using some parts of his house.
84b	19b	"Dream On!" "(Dans tes rêves !)"	Olivier Jean-Marie	Olivier Jean-Marie	Fred Mintoff	2013	TBA
Oggy is dreaming about the lottery numbers; everytime he tries to think of them, he keeps getting distracted.
84c	19c	"Lady K"	Olivier Jean-Marie	Olivier Jean-Marie	Julien Thompson	2013	March 9, 2015
While Oggy is invited to Olivia's house for tea, the cockroaches meet a female bug named Lady K and start a new relationship. However, they become fighting each other for her love.
85a	20a	"Oggy and the Dodo Bird" "(Maurice le dodo)"	Olivier Jean-Marie	Olivier Jean-Marie	Fred Mintoff	2013	March 16, 2015
Oggy encounters a supposedly extinct dodo bird and decides to take it home. However, Dee Dee wants to eat it.
85b	20b	"Steamed Out!" "(Menu Vapeur)"	Olivier Jean-Marie	Olivier Jean-Marie	François Rosso	2013	TBA
Realizing they are gaining so much weight, Oggy, Jack, and Bob decide to lose their weight with a steam house. Soon, the cockroaches make havoc while the trio are relaxing.
85c	20c	"Picnic Panic" "(Panique au pique-nique)"	Olivier Jean-Marie	Olivier Jean-Marie	Julien Thompson	2012	March 17, 2015
While Oggy, Jack, and Olivia are on a picnic, their picnic got ruined when the cockroaches ask the ants trying to steal their food.
86a	21a	"Lights Out!"	Olivier Jean-Marie	Olivier Jean-Marie	Fred Mintoff	2013	TBA
While Oggy, Jack, Bob and Olivia are playing cards, Joey accidentally turns off the lights when Dee Dee and Marky start to raid the fridge.
86b	21b	"Wrestling Time!" "(Catch !)"	Olivier Jean-Marie	Olivier Jean-Marie	Pierre Violot	2012	March 19, 2015
Jack trains Oggy to wrestle, but Oggy is not interested and signs the contract from Bob. Dee Dee also joins in.
86c	21c	"Teleportation" "(Téléportation)"	Olivier Jean-Marie	Olivier Jean Marie	Andrés Fernandez	2012	March 17, 2015
Oggy orders a teleportation machine to go anywhere faster by teleporting to a location. As the cockroaches attempt to raid the fridge using the machine, Dee Dee and Marky are trapped inside. When Jack arrives, he begins playing with the machine, until he becomes stuck with Bob.
87a	22a	"Oggy and the Flour Man" "(L'homme farine)"	Olivier Jean-Marie	Olivier Jean Marie	Andrés Fernandez	2012	March 10, 2015
Oggy is about to make dessert until Dee Dee steals his flour and Oggy chases after it. Suddenly, the flour becomes a flour man and Oggy befriends it, while the cockroaches are trying to get the flour from the flour man. However, it will not be easy because they can easily blown away and get through it instead of touching the flour man.
87b	22b	"The Cucaracha" "(La cucaracha)"	Olivier Jean-Marie	Olivier Jean-Marie	Julien Thompson	2013	March 11, 2015
A Mexican cockroach visits the three cockroaches until Joey became jealous when Lady K falls in love with the cucaracha. With the help of his friends proving futile, Joey decides to make Oggy get rid of the cucaracha.
87c	22c	"The Abominable SnowRoach" "(Bonhomme de neige)"	Olivier Jean-Marie	Olivier Jean-Marie	Fred Mintoff	2012	March 20, 2015
After a heavy snowstorm covers the whole area under a heavy pile of snow, the cockroaches decide to build a snow roach and want to eat food, but Dee Dee has already eaten all the food in the fridge. When they spot Oggy carrying food, they decide to disguise themselves as a snow roach and let Oggy give them food.
88a	23a	"High-Rise Nightmare" "(Cafards à tous les étages)"	Olivier Jean-Marie	Olivier Jean-Marie	Arthur Peltzer	2013	March 20, 2015
As Bob replaces his house with a high-rise apartment/hotel, Oggy thinks it blocks the sunlight from shining bright, causing a mess in Oggy's yard. Worried about the situation, Oggy helps the cockroaches destroy Bob's apartment/hotel so he can relax in the sunshine. Note: This was the final episode to premiere on Nickelodeon in the US.
88b	23b	"Bicycle Crazy!" "(Le vainqueur de l'étape)"	Olivier Jean-Marie	Olivier Jean-Marie	Julien Daubas	2013	March 18, 2015
To plan a big bicycle race in town, Jack plans to get money from the spectators by making a barbecue stand, only to get distracted by what Bob is planning to do. Meanwhile, Marky wants to meet Eddy, a bicycle racer, and wants to get a photo from him.
88c	23c	"Oggy and the Mermaid" "(Oggy et la sirène)"	Olivier Jean-Marie	Olivier Jean-Marie	Pierre Violot	2013	TBA
Jack is relaxing in the boat while Oggy is scuba diving, failing to take pictures of sea life. Suddenly, he encounters a mermaid and a shark. While Dee Dee and Marky try to distract the shark, Joey is interested with the mermaid, so he decides to kidnap her for his own get-rich-quick scheme. However, Joey's plan has gone too far so Marky and Dee Dee have to get help from the shark, and Oggy must foil his plan.
89a	24a	"Back to the Past!" "(Coup de jeune)"	Olivier Jean-Marie	Olivier Jean-Marie	Alexandre Viano	2013	March 12, 2015
The cockroaches accidentally destroy a witch's hat, making the witch angry with them. They put the blame on Oggy, Jack, and Bob, and she turns them into children. While Olivia is having a hard time taking care of the little ones, she forces Joey to visit the witch and confess to turn Oggy, Jack, and Bob back to normal. At the end, the witch turns Joey, Dee Dee and Marky into children; Oggy, Jack and Bob then take them to school. Note: This is a double-length episode.
89b	24b	"Wake-Up, My Lovely!" "(Olivia vs Lady K)"	Olivier Jean-Marie	Olivier Jean-Marie	Julien Thompson	2013	TBA
Lady K is having a great time until Olivia inadvertently soaks her with her watering can, which makes her decide to get revenge on Olivia by making a poisoned apple to put her to sleep like in Snow White and the Seven Dwarfs. When Dee Dee and Marky are fed up of being slaves to Lady K and Joey, they decide to call Oggy for help to wake Olivia up and break Lady K's plans.
90a	25a	"From Mumbai with Love" "(Bons baisers de Bombay)"	Olivier Jean-Marie	Olivier Jean-Marie	Andrés Fernandez	2013	March 13, 2015
Oggy, Jack, and Olivia are going to India to watch a cricket tournament, while the cockroaches go there to meet up with an Indian woman, but Joey only wanted to go there to steal her precious diamond. Things go worse when the cockroaches steal the cat's tickets for the cricket game, so they decide to call for help from some people to find them and bring the tickets back. Note: This is a double-length episode.
90b	25b	"Very Special Deliveries" "(Les livreurs de l'extrême)"	Olivier Jean-Marie	Olivier Jean-Marie	François Rosso	2013	TBA
Oggy and Jack get jobs as deliverymen and must deliver a box of sticks for the Olympic games, two horse dolls for birthday party, and a vase for Chinese restaurant. However, the cockroaches ruin their deliveries.
91a	26a	"Shoplifting!" "(Hold-up au supermarché)"	Olivier Jean-Marie	Olivier Jean-Marie	Andrés Fernandez	2013	TBA
After Oggy and Olivia go on a date, Lady K and the cockroaches plan to go to the supermarket to buy food.
91b	26b	"Oggy is Getting Married!" "(Oggy se marie)"	Olivier Jean-Marie	Olivier Jean-Marie	Andrés Fernandez	December 12, 2013	March 16, 2015
Oggy plans to propose Olivia in Venice, Italy, but the cockroaches try to steal Oggy's wedding ring to give it to Lady K. Note: This is a double-length episode.

=== Oggy and the Cockroaches: The Movie (2013) ===
Title	Directed by	Written by	Storyboard by	Original air date
"Oggy and the Cockroaches: The Movie" "(Oggy et les Cafards: Le Film)"	Olivier Jean-Marie	Olivier Jean-Marie	Julien Thompson; Alexandre Viano; Fred Mintoff; Charles Vaucelle	June 10, 2013 (Annecy); August 7, 2013 (France)

=== Season 5 (2017–18) ===
No. overall	No. in season	Title (French title bottom)	Story by	Storyboard by	Original release date	Asia air date
92a	1a	"The Great Pyramid Mystery" "(Le Mystère de la Grande Pyramide)"	Olivier Jean-Marie	Alexandre Viano	June 30, 2017 (Gulli); September 5, 2017 (K2)	July 1, 2017
Oggy chases the cockroaches across a great pyramid construction site, trying to get back his sandwich. But the blue cat and his scurrilous companions get lost inside the immense pyramid. Note: Beginning with this episode, the opening titles were shortened as well with new music.
92b	1b	"Oggy and the Grasshopper Cloud" "(Le nuage de sauterelles)"	Olivier Jean-Marie	François Reczulski	July 10, 2017	June 17, 2018
Joey fools around with Oggy's bird-call whistle and attracts a cloud of grasshoppers, who invade the pyramid. But Dee Dee and Marky feel left out and join forces with Oggy to get rid of the invaders..
92c	1c	"Oggy on the Nile" "(Oggy sur le Nil)"	Olivier Jean-Marie	Fred Mintoff	December 6, 2017	July 4, 2018
Oggy invites Olivia for a dream cruise on the Nile. The cockroaches, furious at being denied access on board, decide to ruin the outing. Plagued with sea-sickness, Oggy does his best to stay afloat.
93a	2a	"Gladiator Oggy" "(Oggy Gladiateur)"	Olivier Jean-Marie	Fred Mintoff	December 6, 2017	July 6, 2018
Oggy and Olivia go to the Colosseum to watch a gladiator combat. The roaches filch Oggy's popcorn but when he goes after them he ends up being enlisted as a gladiator.
93b	2b	"Shift That Chariot, Oggy!" "(Avance ton char, Oggy !)"	Olivier Jean-Marie	François Reczulski	July 22, 2017	July 8, 2018
Oggy sees Olivia set off to Rome on Bob's chariot, but Oggy does not know how to drive a chariot. Jack gives him driving lessons, which become a nightmare when the roaches get involved.
93c	2c	"Oggy's Special Spa" "(Oggy Met Un Terme Aux Thermes)"	Olivier Jean-Marie	François Reczulski	July 30, 2017 (Gulli); October 13, 2017 (K2)	July 12, 2018
Oggy has a job working in the Roman Baths, and today a celebrity is expected: Julius Caesar. Unfortunately, the cockroaches want to use the luxury spa too.
94a	3a	"RodeOggy" "(RodéOggy)"	Olivier Jean-Marie	Piano	August 2, 2017	July 24, 2018
Jack wants to participate in a rodeo contest organized by Buffalo Bill. Joey also wants the first prize. He is also registering. Jack then leaves the contest and asks Oggy to replace him. Who will win? Joey or Oggy?
94b	3b	"Sheriff Oggy" "(Shérif Oggy)"	Nicolas Gallet	Fred Mintoff	August 2, 2017	July 25, 2018
Sheriff Jack is about to take a nap and designates Oggy as sheriff. Oggy accepts, to impress Olivia, but things get out of hand. Can he protect the bank when the roaches hold it up again and again?
94c	3c	"Wanted" "(Avis de recherche)"	Nicolas Gallet	Alex Viano	August 8, 2017	July 26, 2018
The cockroaches stick Oggy's photo over a poster: "WANTED – BOB". Their idea works: a nasty-looking bounty hunter turns up in search of OGGY. This could get nasty. Luckily, the unwitting cat sabotages the bounty hunter's plans, in all innocence.
95a	4a	"The Green Thumb" "(Oggy et les pouces verts)"	Pierre-Gilles Stehr; Xavier Vairé	Fred Mintoff	December 8, 2017	July 27, 2018
Bob, head gardener in the Versailles Palace, gives Oggy a list of jobs to make the gardens beautiful. Everything goes well, until Oggy inadvertently flattens the cockroaches, who decide to get even.
95b	4b	"Oggy, the King's Coachman" "(Oggy cocher du roi)"	Pierre-Gilles Stehr; Xavier Vairé	Alexandre Hesse	December 8, 2017	July 30, 2018
Oggy, employed as the King's coachman, must prepare the royal carriage and drive it to Versailles for the King's outing. On the way, Oggy comes across highwaymen. It is the roaches of course.
95c	4c	"The Levee of the King" "(Le lever du roi)"	Pierre-Gilles Stehr; Xavier Vairé	François Reczulski	December 8, 2017	August 1, 2018
Oggy helps Jack, the King's page because the sovereign must be prepared in all his finery before the Royal Portrait painter turns up. It is a nightmare with the roaches around.
96a	5a	"Marky's Tournament" "(Le tournoi de Marky)"	Olivier Jean-Marie	Yann Provost	December 8, 2017 (Gulli); September 8, 2017 (K2)	August 2, 2018
Jack competes in a medieval tournament, with Oggy as his groom. Marky falls in love with Bob's daughter and decides to compete too. All's fair in love and war – that's what cockroaches say.
96b	5b	"The Roaches Seize the Castle" "(Vie de château pour les cafards)"	Olivier Jean-Marie	François Reczulski	December 8, 2017	August 3, 2018
Lord Bob goes hunting, leaving Oggy and Jack in charge of the castle. The cockroaches boot them out. Will Oggy and Jack succeed in getting back inside, before the roaches wreak utter havoc?
96c	5c	"The Hunchback from the Cathedral" "(Oggy et le bossu de la cathédrale)"	Olivier Jean-Marie	Lionel Brousse	December 8, 2017 (Gulli); May 29, 2018 (K2)	August 6, 2018
When Oggy's sandwich gets nicked on the Notre Dame cathedral building site, he thinks it's the roaches again... But no! It's Quasimodo, the hunchback. He and Oggy become fast friends, and together, they protect Olivia - a lovely Gypsy.
97a	6a	"A Gorilla in Town" "(Un gorille en ville)"	Olivier Jean-Marie	François Reczulski	December 4, 2017	TBA
An American adventurer brings a gorilla to the city, but Joey wants to steal the ape and make his own fortune. Infuriated by the roaches, the gorilla breaks loose – and kidnaps Olivia. This episode is based on King Kong
97b	6b	"Oggy and the Tramp" "(Oggy et le vagabond)"	Olivier Jean-Marie	François Reczulski	December 4, 2017	TBA
It is New York 1930, and Olivia is selling flowers on the street. Joey steals them for Lady K, and has Oggy arrested instead of him. But Oggy meets Chaplin in prison and they escape, with a plan.
97c	6c	"Dee Dee Capone"	Olivier Jean-Marie	Alexandre Hesse	December 4, 2017	TBA
During prohibition, Dee Dee is designated by Joey and Marky to get hold of canned food. But Oggy exposes Dee Dee and stops his business which has people starving all over the city.
98a	7a	"Oggy and the Treasure" "(Oggy et le trésor)"	Olivier Jean-Marie	François Reczulski	December 5, 2017	TBA
Oggy is cabin boy on Jack the Pirate's ship. While searching for treasure, they meet (and sink) Bob's ship. and kidnap Olivia. A mad chase ensues over Treasure Island as roaches and cats race to find gold. Note: This is a double-length episode.
98b	7b	"The Octopus Masters" "(Les maîtres du poulpe)"	Nicolas Le Nevé	Fred Mintoff	December 5, 2017	TBA
Oggy finds a magic medallion in a shipwreck graveyard and gives it to Olivia. When she puts it on, an Octopus appears, to obey her every wish. Now the cockroaches want it too.
99a	8a	"The Precious Panda" "(Un amour de panda)"	Nicolas Gallet	Fred Mintoff	December 7, 2017	TBA
Oggy adopts an adorable baby panda. In the Pagoda, this little bear is the only guy who counts: the jealous cockroaches decide to get rid of him, but Marky falls completely under the baby's charm and he doesn't agree with Joey or Dee Dee...
99b	8b	"Fragile Goods!" "(Attention fragile !)"	Nicolas Gallet	François Reczulski	December 7, 2017 (Gulli); February 23, 2018 (K2)	TBA
Oggy is entrusted with an honorable task – restoring the Emperor's precious Ming vase. But the cockroaches are obsessed with the idea that the vase would be filled with rice.
99c	8c	"Baby Sitting for the Emperor" "(Baby-sitting chez l'empereur)"	Nicolas Gallet	Julien Thompson	December 7, 2017	TBA
The little Emperor of China is a nightmare. His tutor, Bob, is at his wits' end. But the Little Emperor adores Oggy – who is appointed to take care of him. Oggy tries to sneak off, but the cockroaches – overjoyed to be in the Imperial Palace – block his way.
100a	9a	"The Tiger Hunt" "(La chasse au tigre)"	Jean-Marc Lenglen	Fred Mintoff	December 8, 2017	TBA
Oggy, Mahout of Maharajah Chadabad-Abad leads his master and his servant Jack to the tiger hunt. But the roaches covet the diamond adorning the turban of the Maharajah. While the tiger prowls, they do everything to seize the jewel.
100b	9b	"Oggy the Fakir" "(Fakir Oggy)"	Jean-Louis Momus; Jean-Christophe Buzelin	Pierre Violot	December 8, 2017	TBA
Oggy yearns to meet Olivia, the Maharajah's daughter, but he's denied entrance to the palace. So he tries to climb a rope mid-air, by playing the flute.
100c	9c	"Cockroaches Play Cricket" "(Les cafards et le cricket)"	Olivier Jean-Marie	François Reczulski	December 8, 2017	TBA
The Maharajah is bored and asks Jack to find an activity to entertain him. Thanks to a chaotic intervention by Oggy and the cockroaches, he invents a new game which amuses the sovereign: cricket.
101a	10a	"Oggy's Dragon" "(Le dragon d'Oggy)"	Olivier Jean-Marie	Lionel Brousse	December 11, 2017	TBA
Oggy collects and hides a baby dragon that Bob wants to capture. Oggy attaches himself to his dragon and tries to teach him how to fly. Roaches set their sights on it because they dream of a good fire lit in express by the dragon.
101b	10b	"Beware the Longship" "(Gare au drakkar)"	Nicolas Le Nevé	Ludovic Gaudin	December 11, 2017	TBA
When the Viking leader decides to mount an expedition to find a milder, more climate-friendly land, Oggy volunteers: the explorer will be appointed governor of the colony. But the roaches expect to arrive before Oggy and steal and fly on his beautiful longship.
101c	10c	"Oggy, the Lord of Lightning" "(Oggy maître de la foudre)"	Nicolas Le Nevé	François Reczulski	October 24, 2017	TBA
Oggy's Viking village implores Thor, the God of Lightning, to protect them from monsters. Thor is super powerful and can get rid of them easily, but Oggy realizes that Thor is scared of cockroaches. Thor lends Oggy his hammer...
102a	11a	"Oggy's 1001 Nights" "(Les 1001 nuits d'Oggy)"	Olivier Jean-Marie	François Reczulski	December 15, 2017	TBA
Oggy is a carpet cleaner in Baghdad. Olivia comes to choose a carpet in the shop and is kidnapped by Bob, the vizier. With the help of Aladdin, his flying carpet, and a certain genie, Oggy flies to the rescue of Olivia, this beautiful stranger. Note: This is a double-length episode.
102b	11b	"A Touch of Genius" "(Coup de génie)"	Jean-Louis Momus; Jean-Christophe Buzelin	François Reczulski	December 15, 2017	TBA
Oggy works in Jack's carpet store and the cockroaches are looking for a flying carpet. While looking around, Oggy and the roaches find a genie instead.
103a	12a	"Moonshot Movie" "(Tournage sur la lune)"	Nicolas Gallet	Fred Mintoff	March 14, 2018	TBA
During 1900 in Paris, Oggy and Jack hunt the cockroaches hiding in the revolutionary film studio of Georges Méliès. In a film set, they all board aboard a cardboard rocket. The problem – the rocket actually takes off and brings them to the moon, while Jack is filming the adventure.
103b	12b	"Lead Wings" "(Du plomb dans l'aile)"	Nicolas Gallet	Lionel Brousse	March 15, 2018	TBA
Charles Lindbergh starts his nonstop flight from New York crossing the Atlantic Ocean. But he has a couple of stowaways on board: Oggy and the cockroaches. Jack tries to rescue his cousin using a rowboat to chase the plane. A chaotic journey begins.
103c	12c	"Oggy's Invention" "(La machine d'Oggy)"	Olivier Jean-Marie	François Reczulski	March 16, 2018	TBA
It is 1700 and the cockroaches steal the pressure cooker Jack just purchased. During the ensuing chase, the cooker lands on a cart and inspires Oggy with an idea for the first steam-powered vehicle.
104a	13a	"In the Glare of the Sun" "(Plein soleil)"	Nicolas Gallet	Julien Thompson	October 24, 2017	TBA
In Machu Picchu, Joey uses a machine that creates artificial darkness and apparently controls the sun god. He becomes the leader of the village – a true tyrant.
104b	13b	"Gold Fever" "(Tas d'or et conquistador)"	Nicolas Le Nevé	Fred Mintoff	March 19, 2018 (Gulli); September 4, 2018 (K2)	TBA
In Machu Picchu, Oggy is appointed to watch over the temple offerings. The cockroaches team up with a crazy conquistador who helps them to get rid of Oggy and steal the offerings. He gets the temple's golden statue in exchange.
104c	13c	"Sacrificial Special" "(Sacrifice si je veux)"	Jean-Louis Momus; Jean-Christophe Buzelin	Lionel Brousse	March 20, 2018	TBA
Bob, an Incan priest, is looking for a ritual sacrifice. Oggy distracts Bob from choosing his beloved llama and lets him have the roaches instead, who are attracted to the priest's necklace.
105a	14a	"Rock Bottom" "(On touche le fond)"	Nicolas Gallet	François Reczulski	March 21, 2018	TBA
Oggy joins Cousteau's expedition on the Calypso, but he drops a ring in the water – the one he'd planned on giving to Olivia. So the cockroaches plunge overboard to fish it up.
105b	14b	"Mission ApollOggy"	Olivier Jean-Marie	François Reczulski	March 22, 2018	TBA
Oggy gets lost in a car near Cape Canaveral. Joey bites his road map and leads him into the space rocket, then Marky and Dee Dee, standing in the checkpoint, inadvertently takes off the rocket. Who of the four will walk first on the moon?.
105c	14c	"The Race to the North Pole" "(La Course Au Pôle Nord)"	Olivier Jean-Marie	Julien Thompson	January 24, 2018 (Gulli); March 13, 2018 (K2)	TBA
April 1909. Jack aims to be the first one to reach the North Pole. Oggy is on his team, of course. But they have rivals: Joey wants to be first to walk on the arctic ice-fields. A crazy race ensues.
106a	15a	"Jackoromeo and Bobette" "(Jackoromeo et Bobette)"	Olivier Jean-Marie	Julien Thompson	February 14, 2018 (Gulli); February 13, 2018 (K2)	TBA
In Venice, Gondolier Jack falls in love with Bobette, the Doge's daughter. But dog and cat couples are not tolerated in the Renaissance. Everyone wants to end to their romantic idyll, except Oggy.
106b	15b	"Masquerade" "(Marrade et mascarade)"	Nicolas Le Nevé	François Reczulski	March 23, 2018	TBA
Oggy is a master in the art of making confetti in Venice. The doge orders him to release the confetti for his costume party. By emptying his supply of confetti, Oggy destroys the paradise of cockroaches, who intend to make him pay.
106c	15c	"Marky da Vinci" "(Marky de Vinci)"	Nicolas Gallet	Lionel Brousse	March 26, 2018 (Gulli); June 5, 2018 (K2)	TBA
Venice 1500 – Oggy is a failed painter unlike Marky who is a true genius at everything, artist as well as an inventor. Marky is going to invent revolutionary machines to allow Joey and Dee Dee to steal Oggy's spaghetti.
107a	16a	"Emperor for a Day" "(Empereur d'un jour)"	Nicolas Le Nevé	Jérome Fardini	March 27, 2018	TBA
During the Napoleonic Wars, Oggy is a cleaner in the French army. Napoleon asks Oggy to replace him, so that he can honour a lover's tryst and the cockroaches do everything they can to unmask Oggy.
107b	16b	"My Kingdom for a Teddy" "(Mon empire pour une peluche)"	Nicolas Gallet	Marc-Antoine Buhagiar	March 28, 2018 (Gulli); July 6, 2018 (K2)	TBA
Oggy solves the mystery of Napoleon's famous pose: the Emperor is hiding his precious cuddly toy. Napoleon is rather ashamed, and orders Oggy to keep quiet and watch over his toy during battle.
107c	16c	"Oggy and the Hieroglyphs" "(Oggy et le secret des hiéroglyphes)"	Olivier Jean-Marie	Julien Thompson	March 29, 2018	TBA
During an Egyptian campaign, Oggy, Napoleon's aide-de-camp, meets Champollion, who enlists him for his archaeological excavations. At the corner of a chase with the roaches, Oggy discovers the Rosetta Stone, but Joey wants to grab it.
108a	17a	"On the High-Yurt-Way" "(L'aire d'auto yourte)"	Jean-Marc Lenglen	François Reczulski	March 30, 2018	TBA
Jack and Oggy are holding an auto-youth area. Olivia is holding the cafeteria. Bob, a camel-trucker, points to Oggy's demands as he watches his cargo and flirts with Olivia. Oggy is jealous, but the cockroaches are interested in Bob's convoy.
108b	17b	"Xanadu Milk" "(Le lait de Xanudu)"	Nicolas Le Nevé	Lionel Brousse	April 2, 2018	TBA
Oggy and Olivia run a rest area in Mongolia, where the roaches create a shortage in goat's milk. So Oggy and Olivia follow Marco Polo all the way to Xanadu to find a yak.
108c	17c	"The Yak Festival" "(Le festival des yaks)"	Laury Rovelli; Nicolas Le Nevé	Paul Etienne Bourde-Cice	April 3, 2018	TBA
It is Yak Festival at the auto-youth area. Assisted by Oggy, Olivia participates as the best trainer, with the small yak of his cafeteria. Bob, winner last year, puts his title in play, while the cockroaches also plan to participate.
109a	18a	"Housework in Orbit" "(Ménage sur orbite)"	Nicolas Le Nevé	Fred Mintoff	April 4, 2018	TBA
Oggy, a hygiene technician, does his best to keep everything spotless. However his boss, Bob, detects that cleanliness is only 99.97% complete.
109b	18b	"The Cockroaches' Awakening" "(Le réveil des cafards)"	Laury Rovelli	François Reczulski	April 5, 2018	TBA
Oggy has the mission of terra-forming a frozen planet, assigned to him by Bob. Aboard his ship, Oggy thaws the cockroaches, who were trapped in ice. The cockroaches decide to mess with Oggy's mission.
109c	18c	"The Intruder from Space" "(L'intrus venu de l'espace)"	Olivier Jean-Marie	Julien Thompson	April 6, 2018	TBA
Bob sends Oggy and Olivia to investigate a planet and a spaceship. Dee Dee steals an egg, and takes it home, intending to eat it. However, the egg hatches into an alien who steals Dee Dee's eyes.
110a	19a	"The First Samurai" "(La première Samouraï)"	Nicolas Le Nevé	Anh-Tu Cao	May 24, 2018	TBA
When Jack the samurai's hand is disabled, he forces Oggy to be the substitute, but Oggy fails and Olivia, despite being skilled in battle, is rejected due to being female and can only take the role of a geisha. Olivia decides to switch places with Oggy to make things easier.
110b	19b	"Oggy-Sumo" "(SumotOggy)"	Nicolas Gallet	Fred Mintoff	May 25, 2018	TBA
When Oggy is in conflict with Bob, Olivia suggests that the duo should settle with a sumo match, to which Oggy has a disadvantage against the big dog.
110c	19c	"Oggy Manga Star" "(Oggy héros de manga)"	Nicolas Le Nevé	François Reczulski	May 27, 2018	TBA
Bored with his life, Oggy compensates by drawing manga, but is forced to hide them from the emperor to which the cockroaches uses that to cause trouble for Oggy.
111a	20a	"Color Conflict" "(Des coups et des couleurs)"	Jean-Marc Lenglen	Julien Thompson	May 28, 2018	TBA
During the Stone Age, Oggy and Jack uses cave paintings as part of a plan to capture a Mammoth for dinner. However, the cockroaches are gonna mess the plans up.
111b	20b	"Wheeling and Dealing" "(Ça roule pour Oggy)"	Olivier Jean-Marie	Fred Mintoff	May 29, 2018	TBA
Oggy Magnon has made friends with the Stone Age's first invention, the Wheel.
111c	20c	"The Big Move" "(Le grand déménagement)"	Nicolas Gallet	Fred Mintoff	May 29, 2018	TBA
Prehistoric Oggy and Jack are trying to find a new home after a mistap burned down their old one.
112a	21a	"The Incredible Four" "(Les 4 formidables)"	Olivier Jean-Marie	François Reczulski	May 30, 2018	TBA
Dee Dee makes a false move with the microwave and Oggy, Jack, Olivia and Bob find themselves endowed with super powers. Can the cockroaches compete with adversaries like this?
112b	21b	"Metalman" "(Métalman)"	Olivier Jean-Marie	Jean-Louis Champault	June 2, 2018 (Gulli); April 27, 2018 (K2)	TBA
Oggy buys a special suit so he can fly when chasing those cockroaches. Soon he ends up flying everywhere, in service to the town. Oggy's super hero status annoys the three pests and encourages jealousy.
112c	21c	"Z-Men to the Rescue" "(Zmen à la rescousse)"	Olivier Jean-Marie	Alexandre Viano	June 4, 2018 (Gulli); May 15, 2018 (K2)	TBA
The three diabolical cockroaches escape from jail. The Z-Men – Olivia, Jack and Oggy – move into action. Their boss Bob sends them out to neutralise the nasties. But the roaches relish in their new-found freedom. No way are they going back behind bars.
113a	22a	"MytholOggy"	Olivier Jean-Marie	François Reczulski	July 1, 2018	TBA
113b	22b	"Oggy's 12 Labors" "(Les 12 corvées d'Oggy)"	Nicolas Le Nevé	Fred Mintoff	July 4, 2018	TBA
In the Gods Palace, Athena insists that Zeus and Hades do their share of the housework. But Zeus is wily and hands his tasks to Oggy and the cockroaches. Now the cat and cockroaches have to collaborate.
113c	22c	"Oggy and the Minotaur" "(Oggy et le Minotaure)"	Laury Rovelli	François Reczulski	July 5, 2018	TBA
Due to a mishap, an angry Zeus sends Olivia and Dee Dee into the maze, leaving Oggy and the cockraoches Joey and Marky on a mission to rescue them before the Minotaur gets them.
114a	23a	"The Pig Curse" "(Cochon de sort)"	Nicolas Le Nevé	Marc-Antoine Buhagiar	July 6, 2018	TBA
Circe is in love with Oggyseus, and makes a love potion to keep him on her island. Whoever tries to stop her from succeeding will be changed into a pig.
114b	23b	"Oggy and the Short-Sighted Cyclops" "(Oggy et le cyclope myope)"	Olivier Jean-Marie	François Reczulski	July 9, 2018	TBA
Oggyseus disturbs Poseidon, who wakes up in a fury and triggers a storm. Oggy's ship ends up on the Cyclops' Island, and the crew is in a terrible state. Will Oggyseus and friends manage to escape?
114c	23c	"Oggy and the Misty Mermaids" "(Oggy et les sirènes de la brume)"	Olivier Jean-Marie	François Reczulski	June 1, 2018	TBA
The cockroaches sabotage Oggyseus' compass. The result? The ship goes off course, and sails straight into the Mermaids' waters. Joey does a deal with the mermaids to get rid of Oggyseus and his crew. However, when the little mermaid sings her enchanted song, it hypnotizes Jack, Olivia, and cockroach Marky, so Oggyseus, Joey, and Dee Dee must rescue the trio before the mermaids plan to eat them.
115a	24a	"Bananas of Wrath" "(Les bananes de la colère)"	Nicolas Le Nevé	François Reczulski	July 10, 2018	TBA
115b	24b	"The Jungle Child" "(L'enfant de la jungle)"	Olivier Jean-Marie	Marc-Antoine Buhagiar	May 8, 2018	TBA
Oggy finds a lost boy in the streets. He leaves Jack to babysit while he goes in search of the parents. Jack takes the child for a walk, but the cockroaches have plans.
115c	24c	"The Statues' Awakening" "(Le réveil des statues)"	Nicolas Gallet	Jean-Louis Champault	July 13, 2018	TBA
116a	25a	"Below My Tree" "(Au pied de mon arbre)"	Nicolas Gallet	Marc-Antoine Buhagiar	July 16, 2018	TBA
116b	25b	"Head in the Clouds" "(La tête dans les nuages)"	Nicolas Gallet	Gaël Le Gourriérec	July 19, 2018	TBA
116c	25c	"Super Temor" "(Super Témor)"	Laury Rovelli; Nicolas Le Nevé	Julien Thompson	July 21, 2018	TBA
The cockroaches are driving Oggy crazy. He goes to a witch-doctor who bestows him with a genie called "Super Temor". This creature deals with the cockroaches in a flash, but Tremor won't go away.
117a	26a	"Oggy and the Legend of Excalibur" "(Oggy et la légende d'Excalibur)"	Olivier Jean-Marie	Julien Thompson	July 23, 2018	TBA
Oggy finds a sword stuck in a rock but he can't remove it. Merlin appears and makes an announcement: he who can remove it will be King. Merlin appoints the cat to oversee operations.
117b	26b	"Oggy and the Search for the Grail" "(Oggy et la quête du coffre)"	Olivier Jean-Marie	François Reczulski	July 30, 2018	TBA
117c	26c	"Morgan the Fairy" "(Oggy, Merlin et la fée Morgane)"	Olivier Jean-Marie	François Reczulski	July 30, 2018	TBA
Merlin and the Knights of the Round Table get a visit from Arthur's sister, Morgan, who is not best of friends with Merlin.

=== Season 6 (2017–18) ===
No. overall	No. in season	Title (French title bottom)	Story by	Storyboard by	Original release date
118a	1a	"Crackdown on the Fridge" "Opération Frigo"	Serge Thiriet	Rudy Bloss	May 16, 2017
Coming back from the market, Oggy finds his house ransacked by the cockroaches: it is a total dump. He decides to protect his fridge against the cockroach attacks and clamps on a solid lock. A remastering of "Mission Oggy". Note: Beginning with this episode, episode title cards were revamped and the original music was edited out, which means Artaud's soundtrack will play during the episode. However, the episodes from the first two seasons were upscaled to 16:9 from its original 4:3.
118b	1b	"Laughter Forbidden" "Rire interdit"	Michel Gaudelette	Ludovic Hell	May 22, 2017 (Gulli); July 31, 2018 (K2)
The roaches force Oggy to swallow an explosive concoction that Jack invented to get rid of the roaches. Jack tries everything in the books to stop Oggy, the walking time bomb, from going off. A remastering of "Laughing Gas".
118c	1c	"Cockroach vs. Mouse" "Cafard Contre Souris"	Christophe Pittet	Jean-Louis Capron	May 25, 2017
A mouse makes his way into Oggy's household, taking whatever he wants, namely food and shelter. Oggy has a fear of mice and even the cockroaches are not getting on well with this uninvited guest. A remastering of "The Outsider".
119a	2a	"Strong Coffee" "Café Corsé"	Michel Gaudelette	Rudy Bloss	October 28, 2017
Oggy wakes up, depressed and yawning. The house looks like it has been blitzed. After a cup of coffee he decides to get this place in order. The roaches are more than willing to lend a hand. A remastering of "Shake Oggy Shake".
119b	2b	"Jack's Kit" "Piège En Kit"	Paul Nougha	François Reczulski	October 31, 2017
Jack arrives with a put-it-together-yourself roach-catching trap. When he tries to get some silence to work, the cockroaches try their best in causing as much noise as possible. This forces poor Oggy to try and keep them quiet, which is easier said than done. A remastering of "Cat Kit".
119c	2c	"Cute Little Puppy" "Un Amour De Chien"	Olivier Jean Marie	François Reczulski	November 3, 2017 (Gulli); December 1, 2017 (K2)
Oggy comes across an adorable dog who's lost his way. Moved by the young pup's moist eyes, he immediately takes him in. Everything would be fine if Jack didn't surprise Oggy barking and immediately called for psychiatric help. A remastering of "A Dog Day Afternoon".
120a	3a	"The Great Invasion" "La Grande Invasion"	Jean-Louis Capron	Lionel Allaix	November 6, 2017 (Gulli); January 1, 2018 (K2)
Jack is tired of the weak, useless toxins in the insecticide, so he decides to enhance it by using his new chemistry set. The result is a gas that has the ability to clone the subject it was used on. A remastering of "Cloning Around".
120b	3b	"Tooth Exchange" "La Petite Souris"	Olivier Jean-Marie	François Reczulski	November 6, 2017
After witnessing Oggy receive money from the Little Mouse, Joey is determined to get some coins too, even if it means losing all of his teeth. A remastering of "Tooth Good to Be True".
120c	3c	"Oggy's Costume" "L'habit Ne Fait Pas Le Oggy"	Olivier Jean-Marie	Thomas Szabo	November 9, 2017
The cockroaches play a hit-and-run prank where they frame Oggy by dressing up as him and attacking Jack. A remastering of "Oggy's Clone".
121a	4a	"Mamma Oggy" "La Grossesse d'Oggy"	Olivier Jean-Marie	Thomas Szabó	November 12, 2017
The Cockroaches prank Oggy by inflating his stomach, making him think that he's pregnant. A remastering of "Nine Months and Counting".
121b	4b	"Oggy and the Kittens" "Oggy Et Les Chatons"	Michel Gaudelette	Patrick Claeys	November 15, 2017
Jack chases for the cockroaches but Oggy supports them once and for all, so the cockroaches are thrown out. Just a few seconds after that they receive three young kittens. Jack yet has a doubt, can he solve the mystery? Or is there none at all? A remastering of "Oggy and the Babies".
121c	4c	"The Winning Ticket" "Le Ticket Gagnant"	Michel Gaudelette; Manu Larcenet	François Reczulski	November 18, 2017
Oggy and Jack win the lottery ticket number for a massive sum of money, that is, until Dee Dee gets a hold of it. A remastering of "The Lottery Ticket".
122a	5a	"Super Dee Dee"	Jean-Louis Capron	Thomas Szabo	January 13, 2018
While repairing the roaches' TV in one stormy night, Dee Dee is struck by lightning, which gives him super strength. However, Dee Dee lets this get to his head, causing him to be a villain toward Oggy and even his fellow roaches, Marky and Joey. A remastering of "Oggy vs. Super Roach".
122b	5b	"Alone at Last" "Seul Au Monde"	Paul Nougha	Véronique Madelenat	May 16, 2018
Oggy finally manages to remove the cockroaches out of his home permanently, but gradually regrets doing so, as he starts to miss them, leading to a severe tantrum. A remastering of "So Lonely".
122c	5c	"Snack Time" "L'heure Du Goûter"	Michel Gaudelette	Dominique Etchecopar	May 17, 2018
Poor Oggy, as usual, gets in an accident involving Jack against the cockroaches in retaliation of his cake being eaten, ending up being squashed into a disk. To make sure he'll never repeat that mistake twice, Jack builds a time machine to go back in time and prevent the accident. For him, turning forward – and back – the clock may yield unwanted results. A remastering of "The Time Machine".
123a	6a	"Doll Idol" "Salut Poupée"	Nicolas Gallet	François Reczulski	May 18, 2018
Having completely regressed, Oggy enthusiastically plays with his doll. He puts it in a pretty little doll house, without suspecting for a second that the cockroaches have already squatted the place. A remastering of "Baby Doll".
123b	6b	"Ups and Downs" "La Vie à L'envers"	Olivier Jean-Marie	Charles Vaucelle	May 20, 2018
Oggy's house is ripped off the ground by a violent gust of wind. It lands on the top of a tree, but upside down. Oggy has to nail down all the furniture so it does not come crashing down on his head. A remastering of "Upside Down".
123c	6c	"Bless You Oggy!" "Cache Cache Piqûre"	Michel Gaudelette	François Reczulski	May 21, 2018
Oggy is having a sick day recently – and the cockroaches are out to take advantage of his current situation all the while Jack is trying to cure Oggy from his illness, but everytime he tries to cure Oggy with a pair of syringes they keep on striking on Bob when Oggy sneezes. A remastering of "Hide and Sick".
124a	7a	"The Loot" "Le Magot"	Olivier Jean-Marie	Thomas Szabo	May 23, 2018
With a conspiring wink, Jack slips his cousin a mysterious attach case bursting with greenbacks. Oggy is scared about holding such a sum of money and tries to find the ideal hiding place for it. A remastering of "Go Slow with Your Dough".
124b	7b	"Roach Charmer" "Charmeur De Cafards"	Jean-Louis Capron	François Reczulski	May 30, 2018
After seeing a snake charmer on TV, Oggy decides to make his own flute, in which he steals a car part from his neighbour Bob. Upon adding holes to it, Oggy plays it and unwittingly hypnotises Marky into being a dog that would remain loyal to him, much to the dismay of Dee Dee and Joey. A remastering of "Oggy and the Magic Flute".
124c	7c	"A Crazy Carpet" "Le Tapis Supersonique"	Olivier Jean-Marie	Jean-Christophe Dessaint	May 30, 2018
Oggy buys a new carpet, which turns out to be a magic carpet, able to fly. When the cockroaches tie explosives to it, it goes out of control and Jack must save Oggy, who can't control the carpet. A remastering of "Magic Carpet Ride".
125a	8a	"Wake-Up Oggy!" "Debout Là-Dedans!"	Olivier Jean-Marie	Arnold Gransac	June 1, 2018 (Gulli); June 19, 2018 (K2)
Oggy heads home as the sun is rising. He has one thing in mind: Sleep. But the roaches are in tip top shape and they have just one thing in their dirty little minds: keep Oggy from sleeping. A remastering of "Sleepless Night".
125b	8b	"Wild Flight" "Panique En Montgolfière"	Nicolas Gallet	François Reczulski	June 2, 2018
Oggy and Jack share a ride in a remote-controlled hot-air balloon. However, it soon becomes a joyride when their remote ends up in the cockroaches' hands. A remastering of "Loony Balloons".
125c	8c	"Bouncing Ball" "Quel Rebond!"	Olivier Jean-Marie	Olivier Jean-Marie	November 30, 2017
Oggy buys a ball that starts bouncing off all the walls, smashing everything and ends in an open-mouthed Joey who swallows it. Now the chase is really on. A remastering of "Bugball".
126a	9a	"Cockroach Oggy" "Dans La Peau D'un Cafard"	Savy Durand	Rudy Bloss	June 4, 2018
Having swallowed a dubious pill concocted by the roaches, Oggy transforms into a giant cockroach. Wild-eyed and completely distraught at first, little by little Oggy gets used to his new appearance. A remastering of "Metamorphosis".
126b	9b	"An Intrusive Neighbor" "Un Voisin Envahissant"	François Rosso	François Rosso	June 5, 2018
After his home gets blown up all the way down to ruins, Bob moves into Oggy's house for a stay while his house is being rebuilt. Just how would Oggy and the cockroaches react with this situation? Only time will tell. A remastering of "Homebreaker".
126c	9c	"Serenade for a Monster" "Sérénade Pour Un Monstre"	Olivier Jean-Marie	François Rosso	December 22, 2017 (Gulli); October 31, 2017 (K2)
Oggy does a beautiful swan dive into his pool and hits his head on a sea monster. His panic quickly dissipates when he realizes that it is just old Nessie, the Loch Ness Monster. Oggy will charm the big guy with a bagpipe and leads him back home. A remastering of "The Pied Bagpiper".
127a	10a	"A Shockproof Denture" "Un dentier antichoc"	François Rosso	François Rosso	June 6, 2018
A remastering of "A Tooth for a Tooth".
127b	10b	"A Rebel Bait" "Partie de pêche"	Paul Nougha	Thomas Szabo	June 7, 2018
A remastering of "The Bait Bites Back".
127c	10c	"A Wild Train Ride" "Train d'enfer"	Olivier Jean-Marie	Patrick Claeys	June 9, 2018
A remastering of "One Track Life".
128a	11a	"Bad Luck Day" "Jour de poisse"	Thierry Benenati	François Reczulski	June 10, 2018
It is Friday the 13th and Oggy has broken his mirror. A guaranteed seven years of bad luck. Catastrophes are drawn to Oggy, orchestrated from the shadows by our three little beasts. A remastering of "Wrong Side of the Bed".
128b	11b	"Oggy Cat Trainer" "Petit Chat deviendra grand"	Olivier Jean-Marie	Thomas Szabo	June 11, 2018
Oggy rescues a kitten who was being tormented by the cockroaches then teaches him proper cat lessons but that only makes Jack a bit confused. A remastering of "Oggy Has Kittens".
128c	11c	"The Tenants" "Les locataires"	Nicolas Gallet	Thomas Szabo	June 12, 2018
A remastering of "House for Rent".
129a	12a	"Chocolate Wars" "Guerres au chocolats"	Jim Gomez	François Reczulski	June 14, 2018
Oggy orders a box of chocolates but that turns into a battle when the cockroaches try to steal it from his hands. A remastering of "Bitter Chocolate".
129b	12b	"Nature's Call" "Une envie pressante"	Nicolas Gallet	Lionel Allaix	June 15, 2018
Oggy rushes over to the little boy's room but the door is locked from the inside. The cockroaches are basking in a refreshing bath. It is out of the question that someone's going to bother them. A remastering of "Occupied".
129c	12c	"Flying Lesson" "L'amour donne des ailes"	Paul Nougha	Jean-Charles Fink	June 16, 2018
Dee Dee and Joey have decided they want to fly and Marky is the test subject in a number of very unsuccessful attempts. A remastering of "High Flyers".
130a	13a	"Crazy Driving!" "Permis de détruire"	Nicolas Gallet	François Reczulski	June 17, 2018
Oggy takes his driving test and the least one can say is that he's not really gifted! The cockroaches, of course, are along for the ride, and take it upon themselves to transform the driving test into a real stock-car race... A remastering of "A Tip for the Road".
130b	13b	"Puzzle Mania" "La dernière pièce"	Michel Gaudelette	François Rosso	June 18, 2018
Oggy is putting the last piece of his complicated jigsaw puzzle into place when the roaches steal it from him. With Jack and Oggy on their tail, the roaches wreak havoc as they run through the house. A remastering of "Oggy's Puzzled".
130c	13c	"Special Deliveries" "Invasion de bébés"	Nicolas Gallet	Charles Vaucelle	June 19, 2018
A stork keeps delivering babies into Oggy's garden. Oggy discreetly drops them off at Bob's who in turn discreetly gives them back to Oggy. A remastering of "Baby Boum".
131a	14a	"Under the Sun" "Orages, ô cafards ennemis"	Olivier Jean-Marie	François Reczulski	June 20, 2018 (Gulli); March 16, 2018 (K2)
A remastering of "Heatwave".
131b	14b	"Abracadabra" "Magic Oggy"	Paul Nougha	Fred Vervisch	June 21, 2018
In this remastering version, Oggy bought a ring for Olivia and goes to her place hoping to win her love and her parents acceptance. Unfortunately for him, due to a mix up with the mail packages, he ends up with a magician suit and things did not go too well for Oggy. A remastering of "The Joker Joked".
131c	14c	"A Voracious Pet" "Un délice d'Autruche"	Olivier Jean-Marie	Fabien Brandily	June 22, 2018
Jack brings a female Ostrich to Oggy's place but things did not go to well when the ostrich begins devouring Oggy's furniture. The cockroaches get involved in this predicament, Dee Dee and Marky are planning to eat the ostrich but their leader Joey wants to ride her instead. A remastering of "The Hungry Ostrich Empire".
132a	15a	"TV Addict" "Privé de télé"	Michel Gaudelette	François Reczulski	June 23, 2018
A remastering of "TV Obsession".
132b	15b	"Sweet Teddy-Bear" "Oggy et les ours"	Michel Gaudelette	Olivier Jean-Marie	June 24, 2018 (Gulli); May 22, 2018 (K2)
While his parents are hibernating, a little bear cub leaves the family den. His curiosity leads him to Oggy's house where the latter is getting ready for a costume party. Jack is dressed up as a bear and Oggy as a baby whose teddy bear looks too real. A remastering of "Un-Bear-able Bears".
132b	15c	"Oggy Robot" "Robot Oggy"	Jean-Louis Capron	François Reczulski	June 25, 2018
During a chaotic chase, the roaches shatter one of Oggy's crystal, animal sculptures. Oggy is so depressed that he does not even respond to the roaches' nasty attacks. A remastering of "Copy Cat".
133a	16a	"Christmas Spirit" "Joyeux Noël Oggy"	Paul Nougha	Luis Ruiz	December 25, 2017 (Gulli); December 6, 2017 (K2)
There's a snow storm raging on Christmas Eve. Oggy throws the roaches out into the bitter cold so that he can continue decorating the Christmas tree in peace. A remastering of "A Truce for Christmas".
133b	16b	"A Crazy Week-End" "Bon Voyage Oggy"	Olivier Jean-Marie	François Reczulski	June 26, 2018 (Gulli); August 7, 2018 (K2)
Jack decides to take Oggy to the seaside for the weekend. Oggy is ecstatic and jumps into the car with his ducky life preserver. But hiding in the shadows of the car are three pesky little stowaways. Yes you guessed right, the three roaches. A remastering of "Blue Sunday".
133c	16c	"The Challenge" "Le défi"	Olivier Jean-Marie	Olivier Jean-Marie	June 27, 2018
Oggy and Jack are having a disagreement to see which show they watch until Jack gets an idea: A 10-Lap Motorcycle Race around Oggy's house and the one who wins gets the remote. The cockroaches on the other hand get involved with the race betting to see which of the 2 cats win but Joey puts most of the bets on Jack while Dee Dee and Marky bet on Oggy. A remastering of "Control Freak".
134a	17a	"Soccer Fever" "Carton Rouge"	Olivier Jean-Marie	Christophe Ollivier	June 28, 2018 (Gulli); June 12, 2018 (K2)
Jack is glued to a soccer game on TV. Drawn by the screaming soccer fans, Joey takes an interest in the game and with his two partners and a few buddies he forms two teams and organizes a match. But they need a soccer field. A remastering of "Penalty Shot".
134b	17b	"Lost at Sea" "Naufrage Pour Un Biscuit"	Olivier Jean-Marie	Charles Vaucelle	June 29, 2018 (Gulli); April 6, 2018 (K2)
Oggy and Jack are shipwrecked, floating in the middle of the ocean on a little raft. Dee-Dee gobbles up their last cookie reserve. The two cats are ready to go at each other's throats when a ship appears on the horizon. A remastering of "Sea Risks".
134c	17c	"Deep Into the Wild" "L'expédition sauvage"	Olivier Jean-Marie	Charles Vaucelle	July 2, 2018
Oggy and Jack are on safari in Africa. Dee Dee is there too, and is trying to ruin the trip. As if that wasn't enough, chimpanzees steal their safari truck, and Oggy and Jack must devise several ways to try to escape from the African wilderness. A remastering of "Safari, So Good...".
135a	18a	"Wacky Garden Party" "Pique-nique tragique"	Michel Gaudelette	Lionel Allaix	July 3, 2018
Oggy has set up his barbecue under an oak tree where a mommy eagle is tending to her eggs. A remastering of "Barbecue".
135b	18b	"Bath Time!" "L'heure du bain"	Jean-Louis Capron	François Rosso	July 4, 2018
Dee Dee stinks to high heaven, so much so that even Joey and Marky can't stand the smell. His buddies decide to force him to take a bath. A remastering of "Wash Day".
135c	18c	"Bowling Champions" "Les as du bowling"	Michel Gaudelette	Lionel Allaix	July 7, 2018
The cockroaches' game of pick-up sticks is interrupted by Oggy, who is bowling. However, when Jack comes over, a chase begins, leading both cats to a real bowling alley, and ending with an explosion that destroys the bowling alley. A remastering of "Strike!".
136a	19a	"Oggy's Sister" "La sportive de la famille"	Olivier Jean-Marie	François Reczulski	July 8, 2018
Oggy's sister, Monica comes over for a visit, whereas Jack is in love and tries to be a thrillseeker like her. However, love and kisses will not be for long, as the cockroaches try their best to ruin it. A remastering of "Love and Kisses".
136b	19b	"A Fit Body for Oggy" "À la diète"	John Loy	Véronique Madelenat	July 9, 2018
Overweight Oggy decides to keep fit, much to the dismay of the cockroaches. They decide to perform the usual sabotages to make sure that Oggy stays the way he is. A remastering of "Oggy's Diet".
136c	19c	"Oggy's Brand New Face" "Chirurgie pas esthétique"	Paul Nougha	Fred Vervisch	July 11, 2018
When Oggy gets himself – and his original face – anviled by another prank courtesy of the cockroaches, Jack decides to take him to get plastic surgery to fix the problem. The cockroaches' intervention leads to several incorrect, and rather bizarre, facial-reconstructions. A remastering of "Face Off".
137a	20a	"Thunder Oggy" "Oggy passe partout"	François Rosso	François Rosso	July 12, 2018
While on the roof to fix the TV antenna, Oggy gets hit by a lightning bolt, granting him the ability to pass through anything like a ghost. However, the cockroaches soon turn the tables against him. A remastering of "Walls Have Ears".
137b	20b	"Destruction Works in Progress" "Travaux en cours de destruction"	Jean-Louis Capron	Lionel Allaix	July 14, 2018
Jack has decided to redo the facade of Oggy's house. While he breaks for a quick snack, the cockroaches steal his tools and his trough in order to build themselves a makeshift pool. A remastering of "Beware of Destruction".
137c	20c	"A Greedy Friend" "Le Blob glouton"	Nicolas Gallet	Jean-Christophe Dessaint	July 15, 2018
After Oggy receives a lava lamp from the post, the cockroaches release the blob from inside of it, which then starts growing and eating anything in its path. A remastering of "The Blob".
138a	21a	"What's on the Menu?" "Grand restaurant, gros dégats"	John Loy	Christophe Pittet	July 17, 2018
Oggy and Jack have a meal out at a fancy restaurant in New York City. Things take an unexpected bad turn, as the cockroaches keep stealing their orders and Jack can't wait any longer to tuck in. A remastering of "Oggy's Night Out".
138b	21b	"Good Night, Don't Sleep Tight" "Nuit d'horreur"	Jean-Cristophe Dessaint	Patrick Claeys	July 18, 2018
Oggy watches a scary movie about a Monster from the Mud Lagoon while Jack trips over a mud puddle and Oggy believes that Jack is really the monster. The cockroaches try all what they have in their sleeves to intensify Oggy's fear for Jack. A remastering of "Monster from the Mud Lagoon".
138c	21c	"Beach Havoc" "Carnage à la plage"	Olivier Jean-Marie	François Reczulski	July 19, 2018
Oggy is going to the beach for what he thinks will be a relaxing day off. What he does not notice, is that the cockroaches have decided to tag along. And when Oggy and the cockroaches are near each other, trouble is bound to happen. A remastering of "Beachcombers".
139a	22a	"Itsy-Bitsy Oggy" "Oggy Mini"	Olivier Jean-Marie	Didier Degand	July 20, 2018 (Gulli); April 17, 2018 (K2)
The cockroaches take off with the key to Oggy's fridge and dash down to the center of the Earth. To flush them out of their hideout, Oggy jumps into the Xerox machine and makes himself the size of the roaches. A remastering of "It's a Small World".
139b	22b	"Magic Laundry Bag" "C'est dans le sac"	Nicolas Gallet	Lionel Allaix	July 21, 2018
Oggy chases the cockroaches into his dirty laundry bag. However, they soon find out that the bag contains a world of its own. A remastering of "Oggy's Bag".
139c	22c	"Bodyguard Oggy" "Le garde du corps"	Nicolas Gallet	François Rosso	July 22, 2018
In order to keep the roaches at bay for good, Oggy hires a bodyguard. The gorilla is ready to engage in mortal combat with the roaches each time they get out of hand. A remastering of "Beware of the Bodyguard".
140a	23a	"Playing Dough" "Les cafards vaudous"	Jean-Louis Capron	Ludovic Hell	July 23, 2018
Oggy has a new hobby: modeling clay. With the dexterity of a Rodin, Oggy sculpts a miniature version of the entire house, including himself. A remastering of "All Out of Shape".
140b	23b	"Remote Controlled" "La super télécommande"	Michel Gaudelette	François Rosso	July 24, 2018
While repairing a broken TV remote, Jack accidentally created a magic remote that can control time. After discovering it, Jack toys around with this new remote. A remastering of "Perpetual Motion".
140c	23c	"Locked Out" "La clef"	Paul Nougha	François Reczulski	July 25, 2018
Oggy puts a solid padlock on the fridge to stop the cockroaches' pesky behaviour and put the key in his piggy bank, but when he's thirsty, it seems like the piggy bank is indestructible and unbreakable. Oggy must figure out how to get the key. A remastering of "The Piggy Bank".
141a	24a	"Brain Control" "Le pantin"	Olivier Jean-Marie	Laurent Nicolas	July 26, 2018
By chance one day, the roaches find themselves scrambling through the labyrinth of Jack's (minuscule) brain. A remastering of "It's All Under Control".
141b	24b	"An Unwanted Customer" "Bazar au supermarché"	Nicolas Gallet	Patrick Claeys	July 27, 2018
Oggy arrives at the supermarket, and the cockroaches have tagged along. Soon, their never-ending squabble results in Oggy knocking down a huge pile of detergent. Oggy is literally kicked out by the security guard and is forced to disguise himself in order to enter the shop and complete his errands but the cockroaches decide to cause even more trouble for him. A remastering of "Crazy Shopping".
141c	24c	"Green Trouble" "Vert venin"	Michel Gaudelette	Fred Vervisch	July 28, 2018
After Oggy is bitten by a poisonous snake, Jack has to take care of him. However, the cockroaches try to prevent him from doing so, as well as allowing the poison inside of Oggy to kick in. A remastering of "7 Minutes & Counting".
142a	25a	"Cyber-Oggy" "Au coeur de l'ordinateur"	Olivier Jean-Marie	Luis Ruiz	July 29, 2018
After a short circuit, Oggy and Joey have been sucked into the electrical system. Navigating from wire to wire and surfing on the Net, they discover the fascinating world of communication. A remastering of "Virtual Voyage".
142b	25b	"Whistle Power" "Coup de sifflet"	Paul Nougha	François Rosso	July 30, 2018
Mailman has brought Oggy a stun-whistle in order to neutralize the roaches. But the insects are not stupid and once they've stolen the whistle they head downtown, paralyzing everything that moves. A remastering of "The Wonder Whistle".
142c	25c	"The Delights of Camping" "Camping sauvage"	Olivier Jean-Marie	François Reczulski	July 31, 2018
Oggy and Jack go camping, and after a number of mishaps, starting with Dee Dee eating a plant that causes hallucinations to the user, they end up upsetting a wild boar who follows them home. A remastering of "Happy Campers".
143a	26a	"Bad Sport" "Mauvais joueur"	Nicolas Gallet	Lionel Allaix	August 1, 2018
Oggy and Jack are playing an interminable game of chess. Oggy moves one of his pawns forward and wins. A remastering of "Winner Takes All".
143b	26b	"Showtime!" "Bêtes de cirque"	Olivier Jean-Marie	Lionel Allaix	August 2, 2018
Oggy really wants to go to the circus but has no money so Jack makes a circus for himself, including, for the two felines, the cockroaches who decide to cause trouble once again. A remastering of "Fame & Glory".
143c	26c	"Hiccup Treatment" "Le hoquet"	René-Louis Sauger	Lionel Allaix	August 3, 2018
What started out as a sip from a simple cup of coffee turns into intensely strong hiccups for Oggy, and while attempting to steal his fridge, the cockroaches get involved with his situation. A remastering of "The Hiccup".

=== Season 7 (2018–19) ===
No. overall	No. in season	Title (French title bottom)	Story by	Storyboard by	Directed by Co-directed by	Original release date
144a	1a	"Library Hysteria" "Les vertiges de la lecture"	Olivier Jean-Marie	Olivier Poirrete	Patrick Ducruet	March 19, 2018 (Gulli); June 2, 2018 (K2)
Jack tries to take his cousin with him to practice a manly and healthy sport: rock climbing. As for Oggy, he much rather prefers climbing the ladder in his library. A remastering of "It's a Long Way Down".
144b	1b	"Well Guarded Gold" "Un trésor bien gardé"	Paul Nougha	Olivier Jean-Marie	Patrick Ducruet	March 20, 2018 (Gulli); June 2, 2018 (K2)
Oggy discovers a map that indicates that a treasure is hidden right next to his house. But here's the hitch: a prison has suddenly sprung up right on the spot. A remastering of "My Beautiful Prison".
144c	1c	"The Black Gold Rush" "La ruée vers l'or noir"	Olivier Jean-Marie	Zyk	Patrick Ducruet	March 21, 2018 (Gulli); June 2, 2018 (K2)
In digging its toes, Oggy is oil. In the house, also, it is oil. Once he opens a tap, it is also the oil flowing in. In fact, he has the 'black hand'. His house is quickly invaded of pipelines and rigs of all kinds. It stinks and it is dripping from all but the money comes flowing in. The cockroaches also want their piece of pie, but Joey shows up a little too high-roller with the pocketed 1 ticket. A remastering of "Saturday Black Fever".
145a	2a	"Oggy the Babysitter" "Oggy Babysitter"	Olivier Jean-Marie	Thomas Szabo	Patrick Ducruet	March 22, 2018 (Gulli); June 2, 2018 (K2)
Oggy is given custody of a baby by his sister and Jack. With his twisted mind, Joey immediately sees the opportunity to make a maximum of money. He decided with his accomplices to kidnap the kid for ransom to Oggy. But with the children, you have to expect everything. Far from being scared, the baby enjoys adventure and the cockroaches are the ones to suffer. A remastering of "Don't Rock the Cradle".
145b	2b	"Ghost Hunting" "Maison hantée"	Olivier Jean-Marie	François Reczulski	Patrick Ducruet	March 23, 2018 (Gulli); June 3, 2018 (K2)
After Oggy finally manages to kill the cockroaches with a frying pan, the cockroaches' spirits come back and constantly make nightmares a reality for poor Oggy. Oggy has to do a ritual to survive the terror of the three ghosts. A remastering of "The Ghost-Hunter".
145c	2c	"The Whiz-Kid" "Le surdoué"	Olivier Jean-Marie	Lionel Allaix	Patrick Ducruet	March 26, 2018 (Gulli); June 3, 2018 (K2)
A remastering of "Brainchild".
146a	3a	"Drone Out of Control!" "Oggy et le drôle de Drone"	Olivier Jean-Marie	Jean-Christophe Dessaint	Jean-Christophe Dessaint	March 27, 2018 (Gulli); June 3, 2018 (K2)
Jack has ordered a drone and he's barely had time to try it out when the cockroaches figure out what they're going to do with it. Steal it and wreak havoc all over the neighborhood...
146b	3b	"Oggy's Exoskeleton" "L'exosquelette d'Oggy"	Olivier Jean-Marie	Patrick Claeys	Patrick Ducruet	March 28, 2018 (Gulli); June 9, 2018 (K2)
Armed with his good old fly swatter, Oggy is once again chasing the roaches. Fed up with this medieval weapon, Jack suggests that he tries out his latest invention: a roach exterminator outfit. A remastering of "The Techno-Files".
146c	3c	"The Sacred Roaches" "Oggy en Egypte"	Olivier Jean-Marie	Olivier Jean-Marie	Patrick Ducruet	March 29, 2018 (Gulli); June 10, 2018 (K2)
Oggy and Jack go to Egypt to go to the top of The Great Pyramid of Giza, but when Joey discovers the hole on top of the pyramid, Oggy and the cockroaches fall in the hole and go to the past (when the pyramid was just building). A remastering of "Pharonuf".
147a	4a	"Bleached!" "Délavés!"	Olivier Jean-Marie	François Rosso	Patrick Ducruet	June 10, 2018
The roaches are doing a wash and the washing machine overflows, spreading suds throughout the house. A rain storm washes it all away and the house and its inhabitants reappear. But in black and white. A remastering of "Black & White".
147b	4b	"Wild Rides at the Fair" "Désastre aux attractions"	Olivier Jean-Marie	François Reczulski	Patrick Ducruet	June 10, 2018
The carnival has come to town, and Oggy and Jack are more than happy to go to it. The cockroaches also decide to go to the carnival, just to have massive fun wreaking havoc all over the place. A remastering of "The Carnival's in Town".
147c	4c	"Oggy's Jungle" "La jungle du jardin"	Nicolas Gallet	Thomas Szabo	Patrick Ducruet	June 10, 2018
Oggy has recently bought a super fertilizer that he uses to make his plants super big. But the roaches put a firecracker in the bag, resulting in the bag exploding, showering the house with fertilizer. Now, Oggy's house has become a jungle, and the animals all have gotten bigger as well... A remastering of "The Garden of Horrors".
148a	5a	"Xmas Tree Quest" "Cafards de Noël"	Olivier Jean-Marie	Olivier Jean-Marie	Patrick Ducruet	June 16, 2018
Oggy's artificial Christmas tree is in shreds. Despite a nagging conscience, Oggy decides to cut down a real Christmas tree from the forest. A remastering of "Green Peace".
148b	5b	"Panic in the Air" "Ça plane pour Oggy"	Olivier Jean-Marie	Lionel Allaix	Patrick Ducruet	June 16, 2018
Oggy has aviophobia (fear of flying), and while taking him on a flight, Jack tries hypnosis to help him relax. However, while a relaxed Oggy has gone walkabout around the plane, the cockroaches have come aboard as well, in which they leave all of the pilots tied up and gagged in order for them to cause the usual problems. A remastering of "Rock 'n Roll Altitude".
148c	5c	"Oggy's Beach Club" "Club Oggy"	Olivier Jean-Marie	François Reczulski	Patrick Ducruet	June 16, 2018
Owing to a bizarre meteorological phenomenon, the sun shines on Oggy's house but everywhere else, it is raining cats and dogs. Jack decides to take advantage of the situation and turn the house into a Club. A remastering of "Life's a Beach".
149a	6a	"Oggy and the Not so Smart Bracelet" "Oggy et le bracelet connecté"	Olivier Jean-Marie	Jean-Christophe Dessaint	Jean-Christophe Dessaint	June 17, 2018
Olivia buys a smart bracelet (a parody of a smartwatch) and it becomes a big part of her life – and for Oggy, what he considers a "little too much". Oggy intends to get rid of it, while Marky goes bug-eyed with wonder and wants to steal it for himself. Then, Jack introduces Oggy to an application where it can hack the aforementioned gadget.
149b	6b	"Zen Oggy" "Oggy Zen"	Olivier Jean-Marie	François Rosso	Patrick Ducruet	June 17, 2018
Oggy finds a book on flower power and decides to become a peaceful hippy. The cockroaches try to provoke him into losing his temper, but to little avail. A remastering of "Flower-Power".
149c	6c	"Oggy Snail Farmer" "Escargots contre cafards"	Olivier Jean-Marie	Thomas Szabo	Patrick Ducruet	June 17, 2018
Oggy found a poor snail and kept it as a pet and bought a lot of snails he enjoy. However, he is about to be in for one slippery ride.. A remastering of "Oggy Goes Snailing".
150a	7a	"Extreme Indoor Sports" "Sports d'intérieur extrêmes"	Nicolas Le Nevé	Paul Etienne Bourde-Cice	Jean-Christophe Dessaint	June 23, 2018
It is raining like crazy and Monica is bored silly. However, she gets a bright idea – she and Jack could try out some indoor sports for the day.
150b	7b	"Mouse Attack" "Le rongeur d'acier"	Olivier Jean-Marie; Jean De Loriol; Pierre Olivier	Christophe Pittet	Patrick Ducruet	June 23, 2018
As the roaches watch on with interest, Oggy constructs a remote control for his lawn mower. Right then and there the roaches decide to out-do him. A remastering of "Mouseagator".
150c	7c	"The Power of Love" "Operation Séduction"	Olivier Jean-Marie	Olivier Jean-Marie	Patrick Ducruet	June 23, 2018
A remastering of "Go For It Jack!".
151a	8a	"Oggy's Teddy Bear" "Le doudou d'Oggy"	Nicolas Gallet	Yves Montagne	Jean-Christophe Dessaint	June 24, 2018
The roaches steal Oggy's teddy bear and hold it hostage for food, but he won't give in. However, it also turns out that Oggy's beloved teddy is also something Bob desperately wants for his toy collection.
151b	8b	"Guess Who's in the Fridge?" "L'hôte du frigo"	Michel Gaudelette	François Reczulski	Patrick Ducruet	June 24, 2018
A female penguin sets up home in Oggy's fridge and does not budge an inch. Jack convinces Oggy to disguise himself as a penguin in order to draw the intruder out of the fridge. A remastering of "Penguin Pandemonium".
151c	8c	"The Roaches' Move" "Les cafards déménagent"	François Rosso	François Rosso	Patrick Ducruet	June 24, 2018
A remastering of "Off Limits".
152a	9a	"Freefall Jump" "Le grand saut"	Olivier Jean-Marie	Olivier Jean-Marie	Patrick Ducruet	June 30, 2018
Oggy's sister drags her brother and Jack along for a bit of parachuting. Dee-Dee who's got nothing better to do, follows them. As they get ready to jump, our two fraidy cats show their true colors. A remastering of "Sky Diving".
152b	9b	"Oggy at Top Speed" "À fond les manettes"	Jean-Louis Capron	Jean-François Galataud	Patrick Ducruet	June 30, 2018
Jack and Oggy are racing their remote controlled cars through the house. As the race cars zoom through the house they flatten everything in their way, including the roaches. A remastering of "Race to the Finish".
152c	9c	"Inside Oggy" "À l'intérieur d'Oggy"	Christopher Assefi	François Reczulski	Patrick Ducruet	June 30, 2018
A remastering of "Globulopolis".
153a	10a	"Roach Vision" "Vision extralucide"	Nicolas Le Nevé	Paul Etienne Bourde-Cice	Jean-Christophe Dessaint	June 30, 2018
Tired of hunting down the roaches, Oggy orders special glasses that can sense where the cockroaches are – right down to their next move – and can successfully sabotage their plans easier than ever. However, this makes the roaches so depressed they consider moving out, but Joey has other plans.
153b	10b	"Welcome to Mars" "Halte aux martiens"	Olivier Jean-Marie	François Rosso	Patrick Ducruet	June 30, 2018
In order to flatten out the roaches once and for all, Oggy buys an enormous catapult-fly swatter. Always curious, Joey tries it out and suddenly finds himself projected all the way to Mars. A Remastering Of "Mission To Earth"
153c	10c	"Roach Express" "Comme sur des rails"	Olivier Jean-Marie	Olivier Jean-Marie	Patrick Ducruet	June 30, 2018
A Remastering Of "Do Not Lean Out Of The Window"
154a	11a	"Oggymon Go"	Nicolas Gallet	Jean-Christophe Dessaint	Jean-Christophe Dessaint	July 1, 2018
Jack and Olivia are obsessed with hunting down virtual veggies on their smartphones and winning lots of points (within a parody of the mobile game Pokémon Go). The cockroaches then turn Oggy into a character within said game, and hack its website so he's worth triple the points. An incentive for Jack and Olivia to suck Oggy into their smartphones, Oggy now has to try and escape from the game itself.
154b	11b	"Broom Driving" "Coup de balai!"	Olivier Jean-Marie	Jean-François Galataud	Patrick Ducruet	July 1, 2018
A remastering of "Oggy and the Magic Broom".
154c	11c	"Oggy Learns to Swim or Not" "Brasse coulée"	Olivier Jean-Marie	Marc Gordon-Bates	Patrick Ducruet	July 1, 2018
After being chased about, the cockroaches sniff a horrible odor. All eyes turn to Oggy, who must face the facts that he stinks. But taking a bath is hard for Oggy, who is hydrophobic. Jack tries to cure Oggy of his hydrophobia, while trying to hide the fact that he's hydrophobic as well. A remastering of "Deep End".
155a	12a	"Lend Me a Hand, Oggy!" "Un coup de main, Oggy?!"	Nicolas Gallet	Luan Vu-Ba	Jean-Christophe Dessaint	July 7, 2018
Oggy orders a remote-controlled hand, mainly used to scratch wherever the user wants it to. However, he gets the smart idea of using it to also attack the cockroaches. After successfully retaliating against them, when Oggy is asleep, the cockroaches decide to attach it directly to his arm.
155b	12b	"Oggy's Vacations" "Vive les vacances!"	Nicolas Gallet	François Reczulski	Patrick Ducruet	July 7, 2018
Oggy is joyfully closing the shutters and double locking the front door. Wearing sunglasses and a straw hat, Oggy hops in his camping trailer, destination: vacation. A remastering of "Hit The Road Oggy!".
155c	12c	"Dumpster Diving" "A la poubelle"	Nicolas Gallet	François Rosso	Patrick Ducruet	July 7, 2018
Oggy stuffs the roaches into a garbage bag and throws it in the dump truck. He gives them a sarcastic little wave good-bye but isn't paying attention to the back of the truck which snaps shut on him. A Remastering of "What a Dump!"
156a	13a	"Oggy at the Opera" "Ténor contre ténor"	Olivier Jean-Marie	François Reczulski	Patrick Ducruet	July 8, 2018
An exceptional gala evening at the Opera is under way with the famous tenor Jack. But Dee Dee is a bit of a music buff himself and tonight he'd like to share the stage and the glory with Jack. A Remastering Of "A Night at the Opera".
156b	13b	"Oggy Copy Cat" "La photocopieuse"	Olivier Jean-Marie	Patrick Claeys	Patrick Ducruet	July 8, 2018
A Remastering Of "Paper Chase"
156c	13c	"A Roachneck Cousin" "Cafard des champs"	Jean-Louis Capron	Lionel Allaix	Patrick Ducruet	July 8, 2018
A Remastering Of "Roachy Redneck"
157a	14a	"Sharing Oggy" "Un Oggy pour Deux"	Nicolas Le Nevé	Yves Montagne	Jean-Christophe Dessaint	July 15, 2018
Monica decides to pay Oggy a family visit. However, she quickly understands she's got to deal with her brother's girlfriend, Olivia – and both of the girls are polar opposites!
157b	14b	"Oggy's Elevator" "Panique à tous les étages"	Olivier Jean-Marie	Charles Vaucelle	Patrick Ducruet	July 15, 2018
Oggy builds an elevator in order to catch the nasty little bugs more easily. But the roaches immediately build one of their own. Oggy ups the ante and builds another one, then another, then another. A Remastering Of "Going Up"
157c	14c	"A Very Special Treatment" "Bobos à l'hôpital"	John Loy; Olivier Jean-Marie	Olivier Jean-Marie	Patrick Ducruet	July 15, 2018
A Remastering Of "Emergency Room"
158a	15a	"Oggy Cranes His Neck" "Oggy fait la grue"	Olivier Jean-Marie	Paul Etienne Bourde-Cice	Jean-Christophe Dessaint	July 21, 2018
Oggy decides to renovate his house by building it higher, so he buys a used crane online. However, he has a lot of struggle with how he's going to control that big, old machine.
158b	15b	"And the Winner Is... Dee Dee!" "Le gros lot"	Olivier Jean-Marie	François Reczulski	Patrick Ducruet	July 21, 2018
Dee Dee steals money from Oggy's piggy bank and plays the lottery. He wins and heads off to pick up the big prize only to learn he's won a milking cow. A Remastering of "Milk Diet"
158c	15c	"Oggy Goes to Paris" "Oggy à Paris"	Olivier Jean-Marie	Olivier Jean-Marie	Patrick Ducruet	July 21, 2018
A Remastering of "Welcome To Paris"
159a	16a	"Vertigo!" "Quel chantier"	Olivier Jean-Marie	François Reczulski	Patrick Ducruet	July 22, 2018
Jack has invited Oggy to visit the construction site of his future home sweet home. But in his megalomania, Jack has found nothing better to build than a skyscraper. A Remastering of "The Rise Of The Fall"
159b	16b	"High Security Fridge" "Commando pour un frigo"	François Reczulski	François Reczulski	Patrick Ducruet	July 22, 2018
Once again the roaches have raided the fridge. But Oggy has more than one trick up his sleeve and this time the little critters are going to be caught in a trap they can't get out of. A Remastering Of "Caught In A Trap"
159c	16c	"The Golf Pro" "L'as du golf"	Olivier Jean-Marie	Thomas Szabo	Patrick Ducruet	July 22, 2018
A Remastering Of "Golf Curse"
160a	17a	"At the Stroke of Midnight" "Un carrosse pour Jack"	Olivier Jean-Marie	Olivier Jean-Marie	Patrick Ducruet	August 1, 2018
A Remastering of "The Pumpkin That Pretended To Be A Ferrari"
160b	17b	"Alien Roaches" "Oggy et les extra-terrestres"	John Loy	Christophe Pittet	Patrick Ducruet	July 28, 2018
During a raid on the kitchen, the cockroaches are surprised by extraterrestrial cockroaches. An abominable racket finally wakes up Oggy. A Remastering of "Space Roaches"
160c	17c	"The Laugh Box" "Rires en boite"	Olivier Jean-Marie	Thomas Szabo	Patrick Ducruet	July 28, 2018
Oggy has lately been watching old sitcoms. Joey records some of the laugh track, then tags behind the cat, hitting play when our favourite feline does the slightest move. Joey then makes Oggy swallow the tape recorder, and makes it look like Oggy is laughing by a remote connected to the tape. The whole neighborhood now thinks Oggy is rude, because he laughs when he's not supposed to. A Remastering of "Sitcom"
161a	18a	"Hide and Go Whiskers!" "Cache-Cache Moustaches"	Nicolas Gallet	Luan Vu-Ba	Jean-Christophe Dessaint	July 28, 2018
The roaches decide to cut off Jack's whiskers so they can use them like pogo sticks. With a lack of whiskers, Jack panics – however, Oggy assumes that a miracle "whisker-growing lotion" will solve his problem... but the results are going to get very weird!
161b	18b	"Where's the Exit?" "Par ici la sortie"	Nicolas Gallet	Ludovic Hell	Patrick Ducruet	August 2, 2018
A Remastering Of "Missing In Action"
161c	18c	"Brainy Roaches" "La fuite des cerveaux"	Michel Gaudelette	François Reczulski	Patrick Ducruet	August 3, 2018
A Remastering of "Toy's R Oggy"
162a	19a	"Nursing the Neighbor" "Un voisin à cajoler"	Nicolas Le Nevé	Jean-François Galataud; Eric Dragon	Jean-Christophe Dessaint	August 5, 2018
Bob finds himself in a full body cast, after Oggy causes an accident. To make up for it, the latter decides to look after Bob, becoming his full-time nurse.
162b	19b	"Space Journey" "Mission spatiale"	Olivier Jean-Marie	Charles Vaucelle	Patrick Ducruet	August 6, 2018
A Remastering of "Lost In Space"
162c	19c	"Boxing Match" "Le duel"	Michel Gaudelette	François Rosso	Patrick Ducruet	September 1, 2018
A Remastering of "Boxing Fever"
163a	20a	"Freezing Cold" "Complètement givré"	Olivier Jean-Marie	Charles Vaucelle	Patrick Ducruet	October 20, 2018
After pillaging the fridge, the roaches forget to close the door. And the ice age returns! The ground, the walls, the garden all freeze over...and pretty soon it is the entire earth! Jack and Oggy are now living in the North Pole... Brrrrrrrrrrr! A Remastering of "Keep Cool!"
163b	20b	"A Dreamy Cruise" "Panique à bord"	Olivier Jean-Marie	François Rosso	Patrick Ducruet	October 28, 2018
A Remastering of "Mayday! Mayday!"
163c	20c	"Hypnotic Oggy" "Sous hypnose"	Nicolas Gallet	François Rosso	Patrick Ducruet	November 4, 2018
A Remastering of "Hip Hip Hip Hypnoses"
164a	21a	"Life's a Zoo" "Trente millions d'Oggy"	Jean-Christophe Dessaint; Patrick Ducruet	Jean-Christophe Dessaint	Jean-Christophe Dessaint	October 13, 2018
When Olivia decides to go on vacation, she asks Oggy to take care of her parrot. Jack also makes Oggy take care of his turtle. Adding some circus animals to the mix, it's a chaotic task for Oggy under one roof – especially with the trio of cockroaches roaming around.
164b	21b	"Fishing Frenzy" "Leçon de pêche"	Olivier Jean-Marie	François Reczulski	Patrick Ducruet	November 18, 2018
A Remastering of "Fishing Frolic"
164c	21c	"Snake and Snacks" "Le serpent gourmand"	Michel Gaudelette	Patrick Claeys	Patrick Ducruet	November 25, 2018
On their way back from a picnic at the zoo, Oggy and Jack discover a boa stowaway in their basket. More slippery than soap, they can't get a grip on the snake. After the roaches, it is Jack's turn to get gobbled up by the boa... A Remastering of "Warning! Boa On The Run!"
165a	22a	"The Big Bad Wolf" "Oggy et le grand méchant loup"	Olivier Jean-Marie	Jean-François Galataud; Eric Dragon	Jean-Christophe Dessaint	December 16, 2018
A wolf escapes from the penitentiary and is hanging out in Oggy's neighborhood, looking for food. When he ends up swallowing Oggy and Joey, Marky and Dee Dee try to rescue them – Olivia also wants to help them out, by playing the role of Little Red Riding Hood.
165b	22b	"Poor Sports" "Mauvais perdants"	Jean-Christophe Dessaint	Jean-Christophe Dessaint	Jean-Christophe Dessaint	December 23, 2018
When the trio of cockroaches sabotage a virtual game – in which Oggy and Jack get to smash cockroaches – the two cats decide to face off against each other in a more traditional game.
165c	22c	"The Giant Roaches" "Cafards XXL"	Michel Gaudelette	François Reczulski	Patrick Ducruet	October 14, 2018
A Remastering of "Oggy and the Giant Roaches"
166a	23a	"The Food Dispenser" "Le distributeur"	Nicolas Gallet	Mathieu Chaptel	Jean-Christophe Dessaint	October 20, 2018
To stop the cockroaches from eating him dry, Oggy buys a food dispenser, in hopes that it will be more secure for food storage – but when Oggy realises that the roaches have managed to sneak into the machine, war is declared!
166b	23b	"Up, Up and Up!" "Là-haut sur la montage"	Nicolas Gallet	François Rosso	Patrick Ducruet	October 20, 2018
A Remastering of "Up To... No Good!"
166c	23c	"General Jack" "Commandant Jack"	Olivier Jean-Marie	François Reczulski	Patrick Ducruet	October 20, 2018
A Remastering of "The Dictator"
167a	24a	"Back to School" "Classe de rêve"	Jean-Christophe Dessaint	Jean-Christophe Dessaint	Jean-Christophe Dessaint	October 21, 2018
After getting hit on the head, Oggy dreams he's back in school, with Jack as a fellow student and Bob playing all of the school faculty's roles. The cockroaches decide to make Oggy the dunce of the "class" and it looks like he's in for a rough, strange day.
167b	24b	"Fake News" "Starmaniac"	Nicolas Le Nevé	Eric Dragon	Jean-Christophe Dessaint	October 21, 2018
When the cockroaches decide to post fake videos on the internet and pass themselves off as victims abused by Oggy, his reputation takes a shot. However, Jack and Oggy trick the cockroaches in turn to restore the truth on the web.
167c	24c	"The Machine" "Le transformateur"	Michel Gaudelette	Zyk	Patrick Ducruet	October 21, 2018
A remastering of "Jack-in-a-Box"
168a	25a	"Whose Turn to Do the Dishes?" "Qui fait la vaisselle?"	Nicolas Le Nevé	Alexis Madrid	Jean-Christophe Dessaint	December 1, 2018
Jack has left Oggy's house in quite the mess, and Oggy wants him to clean up. The cockroaches, thriving in dirty dishes, make sure that Jack would rather play around than clean up after himself.
168b	25b	"Blah Blah Blah" "Bla Bla Bla"	Olivier Jean-Marie	François Rosso	Patrick Ducruet	December 2, 2018
A remastering of "Chatter Box"
168c	25c	"Alpine Antics" "Oggy fait du ski"	Olivier Jean-Marie	Lionel Allaix	Patrick Ducruet	December 9, 2018
A remastering of "Ski Bugs"
169a	26a	"Oggy's Got Talent!" "Oggy Pop"	Jean-Christophe Dessaint	Jean-Christophe Dessaint	Jean-Christophe Dessaint	January 29, 2019
Oggy accidentally becomes an ace guitarist and the cockroaches sign him up for the fictitious "You've Got Talent!", hoping to milk his popularity. However, it turns out that the "teen-idol" Oggy has a huge ego and all the whims of a popstar.
169b	26b	"The Witch Hunt" "Chasse aux sorcières"	Jean-Christophe Dessaint	Jean-Christophe Dessaint	Jean-Christophe Dessaint	January 23, 2019
An irritable witch casts a curse, transforming Oggy into a mouse and the cockroaches into cats. Oggy becomes a fugitive and discovers his house under a new dimension – no thanks to the roaches – and the trio are taking advantage of the situation... Note: Cleo, the witch from the Space Goofs episode "Which Witch is Which?" makes an appearance, unlike the unnamed witch who appeared in seasons 3 and 4.
169c	26c	"Run for Shelter" "A l'attaque!"	Jean-Louis Capron	Patrick Claeys	Patrick Ducruet	January 30, 2019
A remastering of "Take Cover"

=== Season 8: Next Generation (2021) ===
No.	Title	Written by	Storyboarded by	Original release date
1a	"Out of Order"	Hugo Gittard	Khalil Ben Naamane	July 28, 2022
Piya is wrecking Oggy's house, but then she realizes that this is bad for him and works everywhere and makes everything perfect.
1b	"A Day Out"	Nicolas Gallet	Jérôme Fardini	July 28, 2022
Oggy, Piya, and the roaches go out on a trip near a forest. Piya isn't paying attention to nature, because she is playing a game on her phone- that was, until the battery ran out. To make matters worse, Oggy's car isn't working. But have no fear! Oggy sees this as the chance to take Piya (with Marky and Dee Dee in tow, while Joey is fixing Oggy's car) to enjoy the world of Mother Nature.
1c	"Pyjama Party"	Boris Guilloteau; Annabelle Gervais	Amaury Allaire	July 28, 2022
Piya doesn't want to go to sleep, which is only enhanced by the roaches' attempts to make her stay up and ruin Oggy's night.
1d	"The Canary's Song"	Khalil Ben Naamane; Branca Cepelowicz	Jérôme Fardini	July 28, 2022
Piya wants a canary to sing for her, but the cockroaches mess with the canary's cage.
1e	"Wool Ball Madness"	Anastasia Heinzl	Léa Cousty	July 28, 2022
Piya gets a package at Oggy's front door which contains a ball of yarn. Oggy quickly falls in love with the ball.
1f	"Mustache Man"	Clément Savoyat	Christophe Pinto	July 28, 2022
2a	"Dear Diary"	Julien Dinse	Fabrice Guével	July 28, 2022
The roaches find Piya' Diary, and they draw on it to make Oggy think that Piya thinks that he's being mean to the Roaches.
2b	"End of the Line"	Yani Ouabdesselam	Anh-Tu Cao	July 28, 2022
2c	"Little Spoiled Neighbor"	Hugo Gittard	Christophe Pinto	July 28, 2022
Oggy's new neighbor, Kevin, is being a bully to Oggy and Piya.
2d	"Nice Little Bear"	Boris Guilloteau; Annabelle Gervais	Christophe Pinto	July 28, 2022
2e	"Water Rush"	Hugo Gittard	Léa Cousty	July 28, 2022
2f	"Ding-Dong"	Yani Ouabdesselam	Richard Méril	July 28, 2022
3a	"Aliens Welcome"	Nicolas Gallet	Richard Méril	July 28, 2022
Aliens visits Oggy's house- But Piya knows they're the roaches in disguise.
3b	"Raw Talent"	Yani Ouabdesselam	Amaury Allaire	July 28, 2022
Oggy is having a date with Olivia. And Piya is in charge of making food that has Olivia's face on it. Surprisingly, Roach Dee Dee does it very well.
3c	"Funny Friend"	Hugo Gittard	Fabrice Guével	July 28, 2022
3d	"Invincible Piya"	Léo Bocard	Jérôme Fardini	July 28, 2022
Oggy, Piya, and the cockroaches are playing some games together. The only problem is that Piya wins every time.
3e	"Creature Comfort"	Khalil Ben Naamane; Branca Cepelowicz	Richard Méril	July 28, 2022
Marky lost a bet to Joey and Dee Dee on which Roach will go raid Oggy's fridge. But he leaves the kitchen because Oggy locked the fridge. But Marky found the solution to his problems: He gets oddly attached to Piya's lamp and Piya lets him borrow it. Joey and Dee Dee? They are very, very, frustrated.
3f	"Safety First"	Julien Dinse	Fabrice Guével	July 28, 2022
4a	"Bad Hair Day"	Boris Guilloteau; Annabelle Gervais	Gaël Le Gourrierec	July 28, 2022
4b	"Unhappy Campers"	Anastasia Heinzl	Fabrice Guével	July 28, 2022
4c	"The Cone"	Anastasia Heinzl	Jérôme Fardini	July 28, 2022
4d	"The Hat of Shame"	Nicolas Gallet	Amaury Allaire	July 28, 2022
4e	"Roller Skates"	Clément Savoyat	Richard Méril	July 28, 2022
4f	"Bye-Bye, Cockroaches"	Boris Guilloteau; Annabelle Gervais	Fabrice Guével	July 28, 2022
5a	"Eek, a Clown!"	Léo Bocard	Jérôme Fardini	July 28, 2022
The roaches find out that Oggy has a fear of clowns.
5b	"The Last Flower"	Nicolas Gallet	Richard Méril	July 28, 2022
5c	"Contagious"	Philippe Riche	Christophe Pinto	July 28, 2022
5d	"Piya's House"	Nicolas Gallet	Amaury Allaire	July 28, 2022
5e	"Oggy's Relaxing Day"	Anastasia Heinzl	Léa Cousty	July 28, 2022
5f	"Birthday Truce"	Léo Bocard	Richard Méril	July 28, 2022
6a	"Ach-Who?"	Léo Bocard	Léa Cousty	July 28, 2022
6b	"The Lost Doll"	Philippe Riche	Christophe Pinto	July 28, 2022
Marky suddenly finds Piya's beloved doll- after an angry Joey and Dee Dee threw his harmonica into the garbage. But Oggy was the one who threw Piya's doll because he thought it smelled bad! Can he find Piya's doll before Piya finds out?
6c	"The Hiking Guide"	Nicolas Gallet	Léa Cousty	July 28, 2022
Oggy leads the crew on a scary hike.
6d	"Piya Takes to the Moon"	Nicolas Gallet	Jérôme Fardini	July 28, 2022
6e	"Please Hold!"	Nicolas Gallet	Romain Cislo	July 28, 2022
6f	"Long Face"	Boris Guilloteau	Léa Cousty	July 28, 2022
7a	"One More Picture?"	Hugo Gittard	Léa Cousty	July 28, 2022
Oggy needs to take pictures of Piya before she leaves for school.
7b	"Timber!"	Nicolas Gallet	Romain Cislo	July 28, 2022
7c	"The Itsy-Bitsy Spider"	Boris Guilloteau; Annabelle Gervais	Amaury Allaire	July 28, 2022
7d	"Elephant Nanny"	Renaud Gagnon	Richard Méril	July 28, 2022
Jack is in charge of watching Piya while Oggy is going out. He's doing it fine, causing zero destruction to the house and Piya. But the roaches want to cause as much destruction as possible so Oggy can kick his own cousin out and they, alongside Piya can live it up tonight with no responsibilities! But watch out boys, Jack and Piya are coming to stop you.
7e	"The Friend Thief"	Boris Guilloteau; Annabelle Gervais	Jérôme Fardini	July 28, 2022
7f	"Paint and Suffering"	Renaud Gagnon	Amaury Allaire	July 28, 2022
8a	"The Arrival"	Laury Rovelli; Khalil Ben Naamane	Léa Cousty	July 28, 2022
A flashback episode of how Piya came to Oggy's house. Oggy is excited to have to take care of his Indian friends' baby daughter, Piya. But she's grown a bit since the last time Oggy saw her. While Oggy must do what ever he can to keep Piya happy, his rivals, the cockroaches, Dee Dee, Joey, and Marky, sees Piya as an opportunity to bring more havoc to Oggy's life.
8b	"On Strike"	Annabelle Gervais; Anastasia Heinzl	Christophe Pinto	July 28, 2022
Oggy's disappointed on how Piya's behavior is when she's with the roaches, so he decides to never EVER clean his own home again for now on. The roaches are relieved of this: They can do whatever they want, with no Oggy getting rid of them! Piya, meanwhile, is worried about her caretaker's current behavior...
8c	"The Amazing Oggy"	Khalil Ben Naamane; Branca Cepelowicz	Yann Provost	July 28, 2022
8d	"In a Pickle!"	Nicolas Gallet	Léa Cousty	July 28, 2022
The cockroaches are trapped in Bob's garbage can.
8e	"The Secret Garden"	Anastasia Heinzl	Romain Cislo	July 28, 2022
Piya finds out that Oggy has a very secret garden- but he refuses to let Piya in.
8f	"Split-Second"	Clément Savoyat	Jérôme Fardini	July 28, 2022
Oggy is having a date with Olivia the same day he's supposed to take Piya ziplineng in the forest.
9a	"The Butler"	Jean Harlez	Caroline Lefevre	July 28, 2022
Dee Dee suddenly gets memory loss after being hit by a painting of Oggy's butler ancestor. He now is cleaning Oggy's house, and Piya, Joey and Marky team up to stop the newly neat Dee Dee and bring the old Dee Dee back.
9b	"The Best Uncle"	Nicolas Gallet	Richard Méril	July 28, 2022
9c	"A Treasured Secret"	Hugo Gittard	Fabrice Guével	July 28, 2022
9d	"Sibling Rivalry"	Christophe Le Borgne	Yann Provost	July 28, 2022
9e	"Runner Up"	Annabelle Gervais; Anastasia Heinzl	Romain Cislo	July 28, 2022
9f	"Mischief Mishaps"	Nicolas Gallet	Jérôme Fardini	July 28, 2022
10a	"Find the Top!"	Léo Bocard	Yann Provost	July 28, 2022
10b	"Dog Day Afternoon"	Nicolas Gallet	Yann Provost	July 28, 2022
10c	"A Dreadful Date"	Nicolas Gallet	Léa Cousty	July 28, 2022
Oggy tries to make up with Olivia after a disastrous date, but Piya's well-meaning attempts to help and outside forces keep getting in the way.
10d	"A Restless Night"	Alexandre Simard	Romain Cislo	July 28, 2022
10e	"Teeny-Tiny Oggy"	Annabelle Gervais; Branca Cepelowicz	Jérôme Fardini	July 28, 2022
10f	"Venting Frustration"	Fanny Courtillot	Jérôme Fardini	July 28, 2022
11a	"Scout's Honor"	Khalil Ben Naamane; Branca Cepelowicz	Jérôme Fardini	July 28, 2022
11b	"Super Oggy"	Renaud Gagnon	Romain Cislo	July 28, 2022
11c	"The Mooncat"	Fanny Courtillot	Yann Provost	July 28, 2022
11d	"Copycat"	Léa Cousty	Léa Cousty	July 28, 2022
11e	"It Wasn't Me!"	Nicolas Gallet	Caroline Lefevre	July 28, 2022
11f	"Puppet Show"	Léo Bocard	Léa Cousty	July 28, 2022
12a	"Package Deal"	Fanny Courtillot	Romain Cislo	July 28, 2022
12b	"Butterflies Only!"	Boris Guilloteau; Alexandre Simard	Jérôme Fardini	July 28, 2022
12c	"Princess Piya"	Nicolas Gallet	Caroline Lefevre	July 28, 2022
12d	"Off the Rails"	Khalil Ben Naamane; Branca Cepelowicz	Jérôme Fardini	July 28, 2022
12e	"Wrestling the Past"	Jean Harlez	Léa Cousty	July 28, 2022
12f	"Bad Uncle!"	Christophe Le Borgne	Yann Provost	July 28, 2022
13a	"A Swell Outing"	Alexandre Simard; Phillipe Riche	Caroline Lefevre	July 28, 2022
13b	"Ice Cream!"	Alexandre Simard	Fabrice Guével	July 28, 2022
Piya tries all sorts of hijinks to grab ice cream instead of Oggy's food.
13c	"The Imposter"	Phillipe Riche	Romain CIslo	July 28, 2022
Oggy dresses up in a Piya costume to fool the roaches.
13d	"Dressed to Impress"	Phillipe Riche	Anh Tu Cao; Fabrice Guével	July 28, 2022
13e	"Oggy Gets Jacked"	Phillipe Riche	Yann Provost	July 28, 2022
13f	"Mammoth Problem"	Alexandre Simard	Romain CIslo	July 28, 2022
