= Jean-Yves Raimbaud =

French animator and screenwriter (1958–1998)

- Born: Jean-Yves Stéphane Marcel Raimbaud; 27 February 1958; Évreux, France
- Died: 28 June 1998 (aged 40); Montrouge, France
- Resting place: Montrouge Cemetery
- Occupations: Screenwriter, animator
- Years active: 1975–1998
- Known for: Being the creator of Oggy and the Cockroaches and the co-creator of Space Goofs
- Notable work: Oggy and the Cockroaches; Space Goofs; The Little Witches
- Spouse(s): Béatrice Guillot; Eunice Alvarado Ellis

Jean-Yves Stéphane Marcel Raimbaud (French pronunciation: [ʒɑ̃(n)iv ʁɛ̃bo]; 27 February 1958 – 28 June 1998) was a French animator and screenwriter. He was best known for creating the animated series Oggy and the Cockroaches, which officially debuted posthumously on 6 September 1999 on France 3. He also co-created Space Goofs with Philippe Traversat, the first show he made co-produced by Gaumont Multimedia and Xilam.

Jean-Yves Raimbaud died in June 1998 after producing the first episode of Oggy and the Cockroaches, having had lung cancer for some time.

== Early life ==
Raimbaud was born on 27 February 1958, in Évreux, France. At age 14, he abandoned his studies in favor of training as a painter in words. Thus, he made his debut in drawing, although initially, he mainly drew billboards.

== Career ==
In 1975, Raimbaud joined DIC Entertainment, a then-small animation studio created by Jean Chalopin, where he learned to make cartoons. In the studio, he met directors like Bruno Bianchi (Inspector Gadget), Bernard Deyriès (The Mysterious Cities of Gold), etc. In the 1980s, he helped launch the series Ulysses 31 and decided to pursue his career in Paris. Raimbaud also contributed to the storyboard of Albert Barillé's Once Upon a Time... Space.

In 1986, Raimbaud created his own studio, Jingle, with Christian Masson (advertising and producer). 25 people under them outsourced series like Spartakus and the Sun Beneath the Sea and Rahan. A year later, the company stood out with productions such as Mimi Cracra (A2), Walter Melon (Canal+) and Les Enfants de la Liberté (FR3). It was not until 1988 that Jingle itself made a series: Manu created by cartoonist Frank Margerin. Thus, 104 episodes were broadcast on La Cinq, starting in March 1990. The challenge of Raimbaud was not to create tasteless cartoons for children only. In 1992, the bankruptcy and liquidation of La Cinq caused the closure of many production companies. In 1993, Jingle itself became bankrupt.

=== Gaumont Multimédia ===
In 1993, he met producer Marc du Pontavice from Gaumont at the Annecy International Animation Film Festival just as du Pontavice was beginning his career in animation; the meeting with Raimbaud was a pivotal moment in du Pontavice's history as a producer, laying the groundwork for the studio he was about to create. Rarely had du Pontavice met someone so free-spirited and independent, so much so that Raimbaud often struggled to settle down. Jean-Yves Raimbaud's restless mind seemed constantly drawn elsewhere, yet it was hard to fault him, given his generosity.

Their initial meetings were highly productive; one such meeting took place when Raimbaud invited du Pontavice to his studio, Jingle, a struggling operation that barely scraped by producing cartoons with meager funding from TV networks. Raimbaud had dreams he wanted to realize and began telling Marc about the projects currently in development. The first was Rat's, a collaboration with cartoonist Pitluc that would later evolve into the 2003 series Ratz; the concept made du Pontavice laugh out loud, which Raimbaud possessed an innate gift for character design and du Pontavice could easily envision them on screen, especially since Raimbaud had already produced some preliminary imagery, though the tone was decidedly adult. Another project was about a story based on the pin-up Bettie Page. Jean-Yves Raimbaud's sketches for the project, which he showed to du Pontavice, were reminiscent of Milton Caniff's work. For a time, du Pontavice toyed with the idea of its viability, knowing that Pierre Lescure, the head of Canal+, was a huge Bettie Page fan.

However, one project in particular Maison à louer (House for Rent), caught du Pontavice's eye, as it bore the influence of The Ren & Stimpy Show. Jean-Yves Raimbaud became the first artist hired by Marc du Pontavice. He worked on Highlander: The Animated Series as the series' art director. At the same time, he created the series The Little Witches, produced by Millésime Productions for TF1 and was sold very little in Europe. With writer Philippe Traversat, he created the series Space Goofs, which against all odds, became among the most popular programs introduced in that year, becoming a hit in France and other countries like the US. He created another hit series, Oggy and the Cockroaches, which came about after Marc du Pontavice approached Jean-Yves Raimbaud with a specific creative brief regarding what Tom and Jerry would look like in the year 2000.

== Illness and death ==
Raimbaud was diagnosed with lung cancer in the early 1990s, and died on 28 June 1998, in Montrouge, France, from a colorectal infection caused by the tumor. Raimbaud's passing was mourned by Marc du Pontavice's Gaumont Multimédia and Millésieme Productions. His series, Oggy and the Cockroaches, was released posthumously.

== Personal life ==
Raimbaud was married twice, first to Béatrice Guillot, and for the second and final time to Eunice Alvarado Ellis, until his death.

== Filmography ==
Year	Title	Notes
1982–1983	Once Upon a Time... Space	Storyboard artist (credited as "Jean-Yves Rimbaud")
1988	La Terre promise	Director; Short film
1989	Les Enfants de la Liberté	Art director
1989	Artoon	Animator; Short film
1990–1993	Manu	Director
1994–1996	Highlander: The Animated Series	Art director
1996–1997	The Why Why Family	Character models
1997–1998	The Little Witches	Creator
1997–1998	Space Goofs	Creator; Art director Writer ("Pink Rhinoceros")
1999–present	Oggy and the Cockroaches	Creator (Final work)

== Legacy ==
Space Goofs became a success and remained one of his most popular works throughout the years, gaining a lot of views on its official YouTube channel. The series ended up being greenlit for a second season in the 2000s, has received several home video releases, an unreleased film adaptation, a video game adaptation co-produced by Ubisoft Entertainment, in 2001, and its theme song ("Monster Men", by Iggy Pop) was released as a single.

Having died in 1998, Raimbaud did not live to take advantage of the success of his cult series, Oggy and the Cockroaches, which premiered on France 3 a year after his death. However, the show became an extremely successful hit after being broadcast worldwide for many years. It aired on channels including Cartoon Network, Nickelodeon, and Teletoon. It had widespread popularity in several countries, where it is most popular in India. It ended up being more popular than Space Goofs, which was where the eponymous characters (Oggy and the cockroach trio) debuted.

Xilam had still held the copyrights of the television shows he created by then. While any sort of revival for Space Goofs has not been considered, Oggy and the Cockroaches has become Xilam's longest-running franchise – receiving seven seasons in total, an album by composer Hugues Le Bars, a film adaptation, a preschool spinoff (Oggy Oggy) and a sequel spinoff (Oggy and the Cockroaches: Next Generation).
