= Stupid Invaders =

2000 video game

- Developers: Xilam Interactive; Titanium Studios (DC)
- Publisher: Ubi Soft
- Producer: Sébastien Hamon
- Programmers: Frederic Sarlin; Fabrice Decroix
- Writers: Nicolas Gallet; Thomas Szabo; Sebastien Hamon
- Composers: Hervé Lavandier; Ramon Pipin
- Series: Space Goofs
- Platforms: Windows, Macintosh, Dreamcast
- Release: Windows: EU: December 15, 2000; NA: February 21, 2001; Dreamcast: EU: May 18, 2001; NA: June 20, 2001; Macintosh: EU: 2001
- Genre: Adventure
- Mode: Single-player

Stupid Invaders is an adventure video game developed by Xilam and published by Ubi Soft for Microsoft Windows in 2000 and Mac OS in 2001. A 2001 Dreamcast port was handled by Titanium Studios. The game is based on the animated television series Space Goofs.

The game was dedicated to Jean-Yves Raimbaud, the co-creator of the TV series, who died before the game was released. Unlike the original show, the game is also reliant on toilet humor and is slightly more adult in nature, making it the first work produced by Xilam to be for an older audience, before Kaena: The Prophecy, Mr. Baby, I Lost My Body, Twilight of the Gods and The Wolf.

Most of the staff members from the first season of the original series were involved with the game's production. The original cast reprised their roles as the main aliens, some of whom provide dialogue for some exclusive characters. The game features the additional voices of Billy West, Rob Paulsen and Laraine Newman, with Danny Mann (Gorgious) voicing an evil scientist from "Zero Stuff" and West voicing the antagonist, Bolok from "The Pro".

== Plot ==
The plot centers around the aliens and their attempts to return to space. However, a bounty hunter, the stoic yet serious Bolok, is sent by an evil scientist to target the aliens. Thus, Etno's attempt to explain his newest idea goes awry as the aliens are frozen solid by Bolok's gun – which forces Bud to retreat to the bathroom. Once he sneaks to the rooftop and sneaks around the house, the player progresses through the large, surreal world within performing very specific (and often absurd) actions, like melting Santa Claus and reducing him into green ooze.

== Gameplay ==
All the main characters of the series are playable through the course of the game. The game rejects or distorts some clichéd aspects of the adventure genre, as standard adventure game tactics such as picking up, talking to, or interacting with anything encountered can often result in instant (albeit highly comical) death for the player's currently-controlled character and the need to reload, for example, often without warning. It should be noted the game does not support autosaving – players need to save manually before they progress any further.

== Development ==
Development of the game initially began at Gaumont through Gaumont Multimédia before the studio was shut down by Gaumont in 1999, and it was originally slated for release in December 1999.

== Reception ==
Reception

Aggregate score
Aggregator	Score	
Aggregator	Dreamcast	PC
Metacritic	64/100	65/100

Review scores
Publication	Score	
Publication	Dreamcast	PC
Adventure Gamers	N/A	4/5
AllGame	N/A	2/5
Computer Games Strategy Plus	N/A	3/5
Computer Gaming World	N/A	3.5/5
Electronic Gaming Monthly	6.5/10	N/A
EP Daily	N/A	7/10
Eurogamer	N/A	8/10
GameSpot	6.2/10	6.6/10
GameSpy	7/10	35%
IGN	7/10	7.2/10
Next Generation	N/A	2/5
PC Gamer (US)	N/A	52%
RPGFan	80%	N/A
The Cincinnati Enquirer	N/A	3.5/5

The game received "mixed" reviews on both platforms according to the review aggregation website Metacritic. Daniel Erickson of NextGen said that the PC version "would have been better as a non-interactive cartoon."
