= Space Goofs =

French animated television series

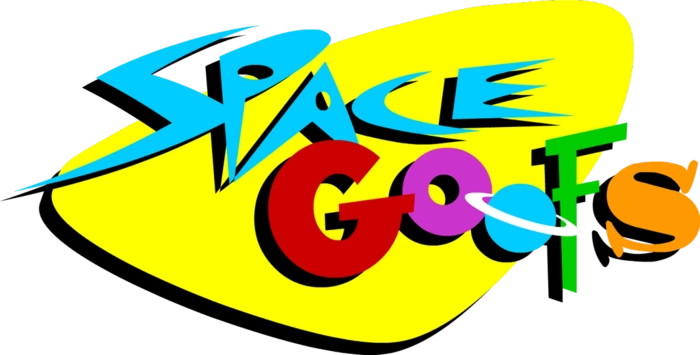
- Also known as: Home to Rent
- Genre: Comedy; Science fiction
- Created by: Jean-Yves Raimbaud; Philippe Traversat
- Developed by: Isabelle de Catalogne; Samuel Kaminka
- Directed by: Thomas Szabó (season 1); Olivier Jean-Marie (season 2)
- Voices of: Charlie Adler; Maurice LaMarche; Danny Mann; Jeff Bennett (season 1); Michael Sicoly (season 1); Jim Gomez (season 2) (Note: Credited as "Louis Garneau" or "James Louis Gomez-Garneau")
- Theme music composer: Iggy Pop
- Opening theme: "Monster Men"
- Composers: Hervé Lavandier; Ramon Pipin
- Country of origin: France
- Original languages: English; French
- No. of seasons: 2
- No. of episodes: 52 (102 segments)

Production
- Executive producer: Marc du Pontavice
- Producer: Marc du Pontavice
- Editors: Daniel Reynes (season 1); Florence Poli (season 1); Patrick Ducruet (season 2)
- Running time: 21–24 minutes (10–12 minutes per segment)
- Production companies: Gaumont Multimedia (season 1); Xilam (season 2)

Original release
- Network: France 3
- Release: September 6, 1997 – August 29, 1998
- Release: May 20, 2005 – May 12, 2006

Space Goofs (French: Les Zinzins de l'Espace) is a French animated television series created by Jean-Yves Raimbaud and Philippe Traversat, produced by Gaumont Multimedia (season 1) and Xilam (season 2) for France 3, and broadcast on that network from September 6, 1997, to May 12, 2006. The first season was also on Fox Kids in the United States from 1997–2000, while the second season aired internationally.

The series also served as the basis of an adventure game, developed by Xilam themselves and published by Ubisoft for Windows and Dreamcast called Stupid Invaders in 2000 – which was dedicated to Raimbaud. In contrast to the original show, it featured plenty of toilet humor and slightly more crude, adult content. It also was the first work produced by Xilam to be made for an older audience – the others being the adult animated movies I Lost My Body and Kaena: The Prophecy, and the adult animated series Mr. Baby and Twilight of the Gods.

== Plot ==
Five extraterrestrials from the fictitious planet Zigma B named Candy H. Caramella, Etno Polino, Bud Budiovitch, Gorgious Klatoo and Stereo Monovici go on a picnic together in space. However, their spaceship crashes into an asteroid and they fall to planet Earth. They realize that if any human finds out that they are aliens, they could be captured and experimented on by scientists, so they take shelter in the attic of a house that is up for rent.

The aliens have two goals: chase away anybody who tries to establish themselves in the house, and find a way to return to their home planet. To remain unknown from humans, the aliens use a device called the SMTV that lets them transform into almost any entity of their choosing, but always cycles through three other unrelated transformations (as a running gag) when used.

In the second season, Stereo is now no longer part of the main cast, with said character only appearing in two episodes. An explanation was provided where Stereo has somehow managed to get back to Zigma B, so Candy, Etno, Bud and Gorgious continue to find a way back home.

== Cast of characters ==
=== Main ===
- Etno Polino, being short and purple with red lips, a big red nose and red eyes, is the leader and brains of the group. A scientific genius, he creates all sorts of machines with the intention of aiding the group's return to their own planet, including rockets. The aliens often fail to blast off into space, either due to Etno's rockets malfunctioning or someone else boarding the ships. In both the original English and French dubs, he speaks with an English accent, but in the English version, he also has a rather fast-paced manner of speech, vaguely reminiscent of those found in educational films about space exploration from the 1950s. He was voiced in English by Maurice LaMarche and in French by Peter Hudson (season 1) and Bernard Alane (season 2).
- Candy Hector Caramella, small and green with a large, wrinkled forehead, red eyes and wearing a polka-dotted apron, is the uptight neat freak of the group. He is transgender and non-binary. He often chooses to disguise himself as a woman, unlike the other aliens in the house, and it is not uncommon to see him flirt with other men. He is very energetic (often cleaning around the house). In both the French and English versions, Candy's voice parodies a sophisticated English accent. He was voiced in English by Charlie Adler and in French by Éric Le Roch (season 1) and Éric Métayer (season 2).
- Bud Budiovitch, tall and orange with three strands of hair, a long neck, and big pink bloodshot eyes, is lazy and naÏve. He is a television addict and spends most of the time sitting in front of it and drinking soft drinks. Like Etno, Bud is laid-back and usually the last one to panic in a situation. He always comes up with the best solution, but most of the time no one will listen to him. For years, there was a theory that Bud's eyes were the result of cannabis, a theory that was debunked by Marc du Pontavice in 2026. He was voiced in English by Jeff Bennett (season 1) and Jim Gomez (certain lines in "The Pro", season 2) and in French by Marc Brettonière (season 1) and Éric Métayer (season 2).
- Gorgious Klatoo, fat and blue with a heavy chin, green eyes and a protruding tooth, is the grumpy and snarky one of the group. He is very greedy, and his hobbies consist of eating, lazing around, and bullying his friends, although he is shown at several points in the series to care deeply about them underneath his gruff exterior. He was voiced in English by Michael Sicoly (earlier episodes) and Danny Mann (parts of "Gnome Alone", "Sweet Tooth Blues" and "Flora and Feast", "Dingo Bingo" onward) and in French by Patrick Préjean.
- Stereo Monovici, two-headed and red in which each head has a slightly long nose and green eyes, acts as two people since each head has its own mind. Early episodes portray him as the "bookworm" of the group who often wastes his intelligence on the most useless information. Stereo is very energetic (like Candy) and is usually feeling happy. Both heads sometimes argue with each other. One of Stereo's heads speaks with a distinct high-pitched voice while the other head speaks with a rather low-pitched one. Stereo was removed from the series for season 2 as Xilam considered him a weak character, but reappeared in two segments of that season ("Other World Champs" and "UFO") where it was revealed that they managed to find their own way back to Zigma B. He was voiced in English by Jeff Bennett (season 1) and Danny Mann (season 2) and in French by Antoine Tomé (season 1) and Patrick Guillemin (season 2).

=== Additional ===
Almost every episode features a new visitor, à la a "villain of the week" formula, who will come to the presumed "vacant" home. These visitors come in a weird variety of characters (mostly humans, but sometimes animals like pigs and birds, and even other aliens). While the credits do not specify who, additional voices include:

- Jim Cummings - Slick Stagger
- Billy West
- Laraine Newman
- Frank Welker
- Kath Soucie
- Susanne Blakeslee
- Kat Cressida
- Michelle Layton
- Jessica DiCicco
- Jackie Gonneau
- Sirena Irwin
- Carolyn Lawrence

Some characters are voiced by the main cast. This is especially more prevalent in Season 2.

== Episodes ==
=== Series overview ===
Season	Segments	Episodes	Originally released	
Season	Segments	Episodes	First released	Last released
1	50	26	September 6, 1997	August 29, 1998
2	52	26	May 20, 2005	May 12, 2006

=== Season 1 (1997–98) ===
All episodes in this season were directed by Thomas Szabó and aired on Saturdays.

No. overall	No. in season	Title	Written by	Storyboard by	Original release date
1	1	"Once Upon a Time..." "(Il était une fois...)"	Jim Gomez, Nicolas Gallet & Bob Camp	François Reczulski	September 6, 1997 (Part 1) September 13, 1997 (Part 2)
The aliens go on vacation together in space (or, as Gorgious calls it, a picnic), but their spaceship breaks down after Candy crashes it into an asteroid and they are left stranded on Earth. Not knowing a way to fix the spaceship, the aliens take shelter in the attic of an abandoned house that is up for rent while Etno tries to fix the spaceship. Meanwhile, the government realizes that the aliens are hiding in the house, and attempts to capture them.
2a	2a	"Venus Junior" "(Vénus junior)"	Nicolas Gallet	Mauro Casalese	September 20, 1997
Etno tries to attract more aliens to return to their planet. Unfortunately, the ones he summons are apparently no help. Note: Oggy and the Cockroaches make their first appearance in the episode, a year before the proper debut of their own animated series (the clip comes from the unaired pilot).
2b	2b	"One Minor Technicality" "(Incident technique)"	Jim Gomez & Bob Camp	Mauro Casalese	September 27, 1997
The aliens are about to launch their spaceship to evacuate from a coming asteroid, but a neighboring boy prevents their only chance of evacuating. At the end of the episode the boy changes the asteroid's course, saving the Earth from danger and apocalypse.
3	3	"Toon in, Drop Out" "(On efface tout et on recommence !)"	Jean Louis-Capron	Rudy Mertens	October 4, 1997 (Part 1) October 11, 1997 (Part 2)
The aliens are watching a cartoon on television and realize that the characters from the show (Foxy and Ducky, who spoof Warner Bros. Animation' Wile E. Coyote and Road Runner) are downstairs, so they try to evacuate them from the house. After they exhaust all their plans, the backstory of Foxy and Ducky is revealed by a toon-hating producer.
4a	4a	"TV Connection"	Nicolas Gallet	François Reczulski	October 18, 1997
While Bud is watching television, a cartoon raccoon leaves the television and places Bud inside it. Bud has a good time inside the television, and does not want to leave. Candy goes along with his complaint, but Etno decides to get him out of there anyway.
4b	4b	"Showdown in Tiny Town" "(Règlement de comptes à Tiny Town)"	Jim Gomez & Bob Camp	Diego Zamora	October 25, 1997
Bud watches a Western movie on television and, getting too into it, ends up shooting it with a gun. Depressed, he unsuccessfully tries to play with Gorgious in an attempt to occupy himself. When that fails, he sulks in the basement before finding an electric model railway, which he uses (alongside a ton of other junk) to build a Western bug town. He becomes the sheriff of the town and even falls in love with a singing earwig named Ramona.
5a	5a	"Old MacDonald Had a House" "(Le porc de l'angoisse)"	Jim Gomez & Bob Camp	Thomas Szabó	November 1, 1997
Tired of tenants trying to move in, the aliens try to make the house uninhabitable, but its farm look ends up attracting a farmer with his animals, and a pig named Sooee who behaves badly to the others. To sort things out, the aliens team up with the rest of the animals (they also use the SMTV to transform into five different types of animals themselves) to revolt against the farmer and Sooee.
5b	5b	"Bats in the Belfry" "(Chauve qui peut !)"	Kelly Armstrong & Bob Jaques	Mauro Casalese	November 8, 1997
A gang of bats take over the house. The aliens attempt to take them out and then accommodate to their presence but fail every time. Candy finally snaps after being treated with underwear and drives them out.
6a	6a	"You Can't Go Home" "(Trompe la mort)"	Jim Gomez & Bob Camp	Mauro Casalese	November 15, 1997
An elderly elephant goes to what was once the ancient burial grounds for elephants to die: the aliens' house. After every attempt by the aliens, they learn the elephant's motive and clear it up by revealing the true location of the ancient burial grounds which is next door.
6b	6b	"Clowning Around" "(Faites le clown)"	Jim Gomez & Bob Camp	Thomas Szabó	November 22, 1997
A couple of runaway clowns make a circus out of the aliens' house. Etno is under the impression they are highly advanced human specimens. By the time he is fed up with the impractical jokers, Candy sends for the circus' ringmaster to come and take them away.
7a	7a	"Scouts' Night Out" "(Scout que coûte)"	Isabelle de Catalogne & Samuel Kaminka	John Martin	November 29, 1997
The aliens' house is being invaded by a troop of boy scouts, so Gorgious volunteers himself to get rid of the Scouts (and steal their food). But after he uses the SMTV to transform himself into a scout and join them, the other scouts force him to undergo a series of painful tests to prove his worth.
7b	7b	"Pink Rhinoceros" "(Les Pink Rhinocéros)"	Kelly Armstrong & Jean-Yves Raimbaud	Patrick George	December 6, 1997
The aliens try to expel a rock band who have moved into their house. But after one (successful, but soon failed) attempt at chasing away the band, Etno ends up being forced to join them, so the other aliens drive the band away with country-and-western music.
8a	8a	"Maybe Baby" "(Bébé boum)"	Kelly Armstrong & Bob Jaques	Thomas Szabó	December 13, 1997
A baby tumbles into the aliens' house. Gorgious wishes to eat him, while Etno and Stereo (but not Bud) do experiments on him, which horrifies Candy. When the aliens find the baby "stinky", they try to get him away from their house. At the end of the episode, Candy trips on a puddle of mucus that the baby had dripped onto the floor of their house which causes the baby to fly back to his mother.
8b	8b	"Holiday Heave Ho" "(Profession Père Noël)"	Kelly Armstrong & Bob Jaques	Thomas Szabó	December 20, 1997
In this Christmas episode, Bud convinces his friends that Santa Claus is the red blob from that night's horror movie, so the aliens prevent him from coming down the chimney of their house with a series of slapstick traps.
9a	9a	"Short Changed" "(Cash-cash partie)"	Jim Gomez & Bob Camp	John Martin	December 27, 1997
Two robbers rob a bank and hide in the aliens' house, and the aliens don't have a clue what their money is for.
9b	9b	"Backyard for Eternity" "(Cours tourjours)"	Jim Gomez & Bob Camp	Thomas Szabó	January 3, 1998
Bud accidentally locks himself out of the house in the pouring rain and cannot get any of the others to let him back in. He spends the entire night trying all sorts of ways to get back into the house, but none of them succeed.
10a	10a	"The Flyling" "(La mouche)"	Jim Gomez & Bob Camp	Thomas Szabó	January 10, 1998
Bud's obsession with TV reaches a new high and his friends try to help him branch out his interests, but they are in vain, and Etno declares Bud a lost cause. Fortunately for him, he finds an injured fly and raises him like his own child until they become too much trouble for the others.
10b	10b	"Bad Luck Blues" "(Scoumoune blues)"	Jim Gomez & Bob Camp	Mauro Casalese	January 17, 1998
A very unfortunate person enters the aliens' house and his presence brings the aliens numerous shortcomings.
11a	11a	"No Account Art" "(Flou artistique)"	Jim Gomez & Bob Camp	Lionel Allaix	January 24, 1998
Gorgious discovers his talent for art. Snobby art critic Vladimir Zakarov loves them, but takes credit for them as his own, so Gorgious unsuccessfully tries to bite back.
11b	11b	"Granny Go Home" "(Mamy Dehors)"	Jim Gomez & Bob Camp	Thomas Szabó	January 31, 1998
An old lady and her dog enter the aliens' house, the former making an awful racket with her organ music. The lady proves to be tough for the aliens to remove from their house, but Etno (disguised as the Grim Reaper) finally convinces her to leave with a trip to the afterlife.
12a	12a	"Buy Now, Pay Later" "(Marché conclu !)"	Jim Gomez & Bob Camp	Mauro Casalese	February 7, 1998
A sleazy salesman tricks the aliens into buying numerous useless products.
12b	12b	"Toy Trouble" "(Candy s'amuse)"	Nicolas Gallet	Thomas Szabó	February 14, 1998
As Candy tends to his watermelons, the children in the neighboring house mistake him for a doll. In their house, Candy takes plenty of abuse from both the children and their cat until he escapes, along with a pink duck who had also been captured.
13a	13a	"Gnome Alone" "(À vos souhaits !)"	Jim Gomez & Bob Camp	Gontran Hoarau	February 21, 1998
The aliens see what looks like a gnome outside their house and try to catch him for a wish. The gnome, seeing this as an advantage, pools the aliens' resources while they remain ignorant of the fact that he is a fake. Note: For this episode's English dub, Gorgious is voiced by both Michael Sicoly and Danny Mann, and only two others have this distinction ("Sweet Tooth Blues" & "Flora and Feast").
13b	13b	"Rip Van Etno" "(Le monde selon Etno)"	Jim Gomez & Bob Camp	Thomas Szabó	February 28, 1998
Etno is experimenting on cockroaches until Bud accidentally knocks out him with a golf ball. Etno dreams of waking up 47 years later in a world that is ruled by cockroaches. When he eventually wakes up in real life, he sends the cockroaches out of the house.
14a	14a	"Rebel Without a Brain" "(Rebelle)"	Jim Gomez & Bob Camp	Mauro Casalese	March 7, 1998
Candy, Etno, Stereo and Gorgious try to help Bud, who happens to be going through a rebellious stage in his adolescence, by transforming themselves into a human family. However, Bud and his visiting friend Brandon become too unbearable for them to cope with.
14b	14b	"Time for a Change" "(De temps en temps)"	Jim Gomez & Bob Camp	Chris Savino	March 14, 1998
Tired of lowly tenants moving in, the aliens transport themselves and the house back in time to the seventeenth century. However, after finding the humans who lived in that era no better than those that came after them, the aliens travel back to the present.
15a	15a	"Snoutra"	Jim Gomez & Bob Camp	Mauro Casalese	March 21, 1998
Candy's favorite singer (and obsessive crush) Snoutra (whose name is a pun on Sinatra), along with his wife and bodyguard, move into the aliens' house. Candy goes to great lengths to get Snoutra to notice him. Meanwhile, the others, sick of his music, try to get rid of him.
15b	15b	"Sweet Tooth Blues" "(Brosse-toi les dents)"	Jim Gomez & Bob Camp	François Reczulski	March 28, 1998
Gorgious is eating excessive junk food. After he takes his craving too far, the other aliens take drastic action to snap him out of it after he has a nightmare inspired by Candy Land.
16a	16a	"Flora and Feast" "(Dites-le avec des fleurs)"	Jim Gomez & Bob Camp	Olivier Poirette	April 4, 1998
Etno gives Candy some alien plants for a flower-growing contest after Gorgious carelessly eats them, but Candy gives them an overdose of growth formula, and begins to take care of the plant (which he names Charlie) excessively while shirking his daily duties. The plant then becomes a monstrous glutton and wrecks the aliens' house.
16b	16b	"Dingo Bingo"	Nicolas Gallet	François Reczulski	April 11, 1998
Gorgious wins the lottery, and soon after receiving his $20 billion, he builds a sky-high mansion with his new money. He does not share it with his fellow aliens and Candy, Etno, Stereo and Bud are enraged. The other aliens then attempt to work for Gorgious, and much to their dismay, he pays them in peanuts. Gorgious later realizes his mistake and starts to miss his friends, eventually blowing up his mansion and returning to the abandoned house. Note: Starting with this episode, Danny Mann voiced Gorgious for the remainder of the English dub.
17a	17a	"We Robot" "(Un cerveau, trois boulons)"	Jim Gomez & Bob Camp	Mauro Casalese	April 18, 1998
Etno creates a robot to serve him. The other aliens are initially unhappy with Etno for not letting the robot serve them all, until he gives in and says that they can share him. The aliens then proceed to overwork the enslaved robot and he eventually escapes from their house in a rocket ship that Etno built to try and get them back to the planet Zigma B, taking Candy's vacuum cleaner with him.
17b	17b	"Neighborhood Watch" "(Témoin gênant)"	Jim Gomez & Bob Camp	Olivier Poirette	April 25, 1998
The man living in the house next door to the aliens' discovers the aliens in their house and tries to report them to the police. When the police refuse to believe him, he tries numerous times to take photographic evidence of them as proof of their existence.
18a	18a	"Mother from Another Planet" "(Maman !)"	Jim Gomez & Bob Camp	François Reczulski	May 2, 1998
Candy's mother Marzipan lands on Earth for a visit and quickly overstays her welcome with her embarrassing stories about Candy's past and general demeanor.
18b	18b	"Spook to Rent" "(Être ou ne pas spectre)"	Jim Gomez & Bob Camp	Mauro Casalese	May 9, 1998
The ghost of the Flying Dutchman is wrecking everything in the aliens' house (including Candy's brown pantyhose, Etno's ascots and Gorgious' mahogany backscratcher), so they try to drive him out with a series of kooky rituals.
19a	19a	"20,000 Feet Under Home to Rent" "(20 000 lieues sous la mere)"	Nicolas Gallet	François Reczulski	May 16, 1998
When Gorgious tries to flood the bathroom, wasting water when he falls asleep in the bathtub, Candy opens the bathroom's door and soaks the aliens' entire house. Etno then has a brilliant idea to flood the entire house into an aquatic-like atmosphere to keep human tenants away forever. However, two hydrologists, Professor Coustel (whose surname is a pun on that of Jacques Cousteau) and his assistant Bernard move aboard the submarine to observe some of the rare aquatic species (including the aliens themselves, who transformed themselves into a seahorse, lobster, two-headed octopus, electric eel and piranha with the SMTV so they were able to breathe underwater).
19b	19b	"Bongo Park"	Jim Gomez & Bob Camp	Bob Camp	May 23, 1998
Fox Bongo, a strange entertainment tycoon builds a new theme park called "Bongo Land" outside the aliens' house with a roller coaster, known as the "Death-Defying House of Space Weirdos", running through the house (Candy, Etno and Gorgious are also forced to wear fake green antennae, while Stereo brushes their teeth and Bud reads a paper in the bath) – as well as a rocket ship ride.
20a	20a	"Flashman vs. Zork" "(Flashman contre Zork)"	Nicolas Gallet	François Reczulski	May 30, 1998
The aliens' next visiting tenant is none other than the famous superhero Flashman (whose name is a cross between that of The Flash and all superheroes whose names end with "man"). Then his brother and rival Zork moves into their house and battles against him. The aliens' only chance of removing them from their house is to call their mother, who is referred to as "Mrs. Hero".
20b	20b	"Pinball Planet" "(Pète-planète)"	Jean Louis-Capron	Mauro Casalese	June 6, 1998
Gorgious unwittingly unleashes three troublesome genies while cleaning the toilet. The genies start wreaking havoc and eventually blow up several planets in the galaxy (they even threaten to blow up Zigma B as well). In response, Gorgious transforms himself into a genie with the SMTV and retaliates by reflecting the genies' magic onto them, defeating them, and flushing them down the toilet from whence they came.
21a	21a	"Cassius Gorgious"	Jean Louis-Capron	François Reczulski	June 13, 1998
A heavyweight champion named Mickey moves into the aliens' house and turns it into a boxing center to face him. When the aliens' attempts at removing him from their house fail, they try stealing his teddy bear, Bobo, for ransom. However, Bobo turns out to be living, and reveals that he also hates Mickey, so the episode ends with Bobo driving Mickey away from the aliens' house in his teddy car.
21b	21b	"Busy Bees" "(Abeilles de mon cœur)"	Jean Louis-Capron	François Reczulski	June 20, 1998
A beekeeper moves into the aliens' house. Gorgious tries to remove him from it but merely makes him successful enough to turn it into a honey factory. The overworked bees soon leave to go on a hot-dog business, while Gorgious returns to his betrayed friends.
22a	22a	"Party Time in Hell" "(Allez au diable !)"	Jean Louis-Capron	Mauro Casalese	June 27, 1998
The aliens find that their basement has become a doorway to Hell, where people sign their souls to the Devil. When the aliens get sent to Hell, they make the Devil take them back up to Earth after they manage to change the ways of his two Imp henchmen.
22b	22b	"Our Ancestors the Humans" "(Nos ancêtres les humains)"	Nicolas Gallet	François Reczulski	July 4, 1998
Tax collectors Nefu Ganioni and Alex pay a visit to the aliens' house, saying that the aliens owe them 23 years of back taxes. Unwilling to lose their house, the aliens attempt to flee using a time machine that Etno has constructed, only to encounter the same tax collectors at every era they visit.
23a	23a	"Timber"	Jean Louis-Capron	François Reczulski	July 11, 1998
The aliens go to the countryside to escape from the noisy and dirty town. However, the pesky creatures make their stay a torment.
23b	23b	"Prison Pals" "(Les aliens font le mur)"	Nicolas Gallet	Rudy Mertens	July 18, 1998
The aliens' house is turned into a prison with cells, walls, and aggressive rats, blocking off their access to their own refrigerator. After the aliens turn themselves into prisoners with the SMTV and get jailed, they team up with another prisoner to escape.
24a	24a	"The Pro" "(Lucien)"	Jean Louis-Capron	François Reczulski	July 25, 1998
A hitman named Bolok and his pet fish move into the aliens' house, and the former destroys all their garden gnomes. With this evidence, they have to get him arrested. At the end of the episode, Bolok ends up in a hospital, screaming, as a dog is put into his injured body by a mailman for a payment and being called a useless loser, and he is now also a bandaged gnome with his arms falling down.
24b	24b	"Dead Funny" "(Et vous trouvez ça drôle ?)"	Jean Louis-Capron	Diego Zamora	August 1, 1998
Candy, Etno, Bud and Gorgious give Stereo a wannabe comedian for their birthday, which soon leads to chaos.
25a	25a	"Zero Stuff" "(L'étoffe des zéros)"	Nicolas Gallet	François Reczulski	August 8, 1998
A mad scientist named Dr. Sakarin and his assistant Igor are trying to destroy a planet, of which the aliens disapprove.
25b	25b	"Small You Said?" "(Au royaume des minus)"	Nicolas Gallet	François Reczulski	August 15, 1998
Gorgious gets shrunk down with Etno's new shrinking machine after tormenting small creatures.
26a	26a	"Count Gracula" "(Gracula)"	Jean Louis-Capron	François Reczulski	August 22, 1998
The vampire Count Gracula (whose surname is a pun on that of Count Dracula) and his bat friend move into the aliens' house on the night of Hallowe'en, and after the former bites Gorgious, he becomes a vampire himself, so he soon bites the other aliens to turn them into vampires as well. Count Gracula, his bat and the aliens then try to bite other people to turn them into vampires but fail.
26b	26b	"First Love" "(La toute première fois)"	Jean Louis-Capron & Regis Hochman	Mauro Casalese	August 29, 1998
A seductive and shallow woman moves into the aliens' house, dumps her boyfriend/husband, and makes Etno, Stereo, Bud and Gorgious fall in love with her one by one after she hits on them. Candy is the only one unaffected by her wiles.

=== Season 2 (2005–06) ===
All episodes in this season were directed by Olivier Jean-Marie and aired on Fridays.

No. overall	No. in season	Title	Written by	Storyboard by	Original release date
27a	1a	"Don't Monkey with Me!" "(Hypocrite)"	Thomas Szabó	Olivier Jean-Marie	May 20, 2005
An escaped zoo monkey named Maurice hides out inside the aliens' house. Gorgious soon becomes a target for Maurice to set up and torment.
27b	1b	"Operation Guinea Pig" "(Cochon dingue)"	Olivier Jean-Marie	Olivier Jean-Marie	May 27, 2005
Bud gets a guinea pig who apparently has a mind of his own. The others are amazed by his genius, but Etno quickly becomes jealous of him.
28a	2a	"Zero Gravity" "(Gravité Zéro)"	Thomas Szabó	Olivier Jean-Marie	June 3, 2005
Etno launches the house into space hoping to get himself and the others (apart from Stereo, as they only appeared in two episodes of this season) back to their home planet, but it ends up landing on the Moon instead. They soon find out the hard way that the Moon is not real.
28b	2b	"Macho Kung-fu"	Olivier Jean-Marie	François Reczulski	June 10, 2005
Gorgious has developed an obsession with Kung Fu, which is intensified when the movie star Steve Wong moves into the aliens' house. Candy and Gorgious' attempts at getting themselves closer to Wong by transforming themselves with the SMTV, which fail, only make things worse.
29a	3a	"Stupid Invaders" "(Les Envahisseurs)"	Thomas Szabó	François Reczulski	June 17, 2005
The aliens get new neighbors who are extremely annoying. After Etno has finished building his new saucer, one of them rings their house's doorbell to invite him and the others (after they transform themselves into a model family with the SMTV) to come to a barbecue organized in their backyard as a housewarming party. The aliens try to befriend them but end up revealing their true identities to them at the end.
29b	3b	"Musical Chairs" "(Chaises musicales)"	Nicolas Gallet	François Reczulski	June 24, 2005
A robot who drives a space cab arrives on Earth, and even though he can take the aliens back to their home planet, his cab only has three available seats, so one of them will have to stay behind on Earth (Candy, Etno and Bud decide that Gorgious should be the one who stays).
30a	4a	"Space Cruiser to the Rescue" "(Space micmac)"	Olivier Jean-Marie	Olivier Jean-Marie	July 1, 2005
When Bud is watching his favorite science-fiction television series, a bolt of lightning blows a fuse and causes a short-circuit, and the two main characters in the series (Steve and Barbara) find themselves materialized inside the aliens' house. They are convinced that they are on a mission and hunt with ice cubes to freeze the aliens, but Etno tries to explain to them that they are merely cartoon characters.
30b	4b	"Madame Zelza"	Olivier Jean-Marie	François Reczulski	July 8, 2005
A psychic named Madame Zelza moves into the aliens' house. After Gorgious accidentally breaks her crystal ball, she places a curse called "The Dreaded Curse of the 2,000 Dirty Gym Socks" on the aliens, which causes Candy's vacuum to break down, Bud's favorite television show to be cancelled and Gorgious to become sick from eating chocolate-stuffed oysters until they pay her €5000. Etno specifically researches, reacts and demonstrates the irrationality of Zelza's practices, and transforms himself into a rival psychic named "Madame Zetno" with the SMTV to try and drive her out of business. Note: As a referential gag, Oggy from Oggy and the Cockroaches can be seen on a page of a book during this episode.
31a	5a	"Get Off My Couch!" "(Divan le terrible)"	Pierre Colin-Thibert	François Reczulski	July 15, 2005
A psychiatrist named Dr. Sigmund (after Sigmund Freud) moves into the aliens' house and gets them to change their ways. Soon Candy is acting calmer, Bud is acting mature, and Gorgious is eating healthy. Note: As the second Oggy reference, a minor character (a large, fat woman with a bobcut) and her pet poodle appear in the episode.
31b	5b	"The "Thing" from Beyond" "(L'extraterrestre)"	Olivier Jean-Marie	Charles Vaucelle	July 22, 2005
A small green alien which can duplicate itself lands in the aliens' yard. Note: Paul Dukas' The Sorcerer's Apprentice can be heard in this episode during the scene when Candy conducts with the duplicated green aliens as vacuum cleaners cleaning a massive pile of dust.
32a	6a	"Tired Big Time" "(Grosse fatigue)"	Nicolas Gallet & Olivier Jean-Marie	Charles Vaucelle	July 29, 2005
A man who has not slept in seven years and has a sleepwalking problem moves into the house. However, the aliens cannot deal with it, because the man sleepwalks.
32b	6b	"Heavy Metal Madness" "(Gros cubes)"	Pierre Colin-Thibert	François Reczulski	August 5, 2005
A group of motorcycle riders named the Roadkill Gang move into the aliens' house. The aliens then, after using the SMTV to transform into four motorcycle riders themselves so they can form a rival gang, try to get rid of the Roadkill Gang by showing off their stunts to them.
33a	7a	"Sir, Yes Sir!" "(Marche à l'ombre)"	François Rosso	Hugo Gittard	August 12, 2005
A training officer named Colonel Kenny moves into the aliens' house, and Gorgious decides to help him in his objective after transforming himself with the SMTV, but their mission may involve eliminating Candy. Meanwhile, Etno and Bud try to find the source of a heat problem.
33b	7b	"Crash Test Dummy" "(La poupée qui fait boum)"	François Rosso & Olivier Jean-Marie	François Reczulski	August 19, 2005
A robot which is actually a crash test dummy moves into the aliens' house and persuades Bud to take his place as a new dummy replacement.
34a	8a	"Which Witch is Which?" "(Coquin de sort)"	Olivier Jean-Marie	Charles Vaucelle	August 26, 2005
When Etno, Bud and Gorgious forget to get Candy something on his birthday, a witch named Miss Cleo casts a spell on them to cheer him up.
34b	8b	"Other World Champs!" "(Champion du monde)"	Olivier Jean-Marie	Hugo Gittard	September 2, 2005
A team of basketball players are playing a game on the ground floor of the aliens' house and the players keep getting injured. The aliens replace them all, but when the fifth player is out, they must rely on a miracle (Stereo, as he returns in this episode).
35a	9a	"Bollywood Aliens" "(Les Zinzins de Bollywood)"	Olivier Jean-Marie	Olivier Jean-Marie	September 9, 2005
An Indian princess named Zibouya moves into the aliens' house. When Etno sees her, he falls in love with her, but Candy, Bud and Gorgious want to get rid of her, because she (much like every other human who had moved into their house before her) could reveal their existence.
35b	9b	"The Tunnel" "(Le tunnel)"	Olivier Jean-Marie	François Reczulski	September 16, 2005
A very strange criminal moves into the aliens' house and plans to dig a tunnel from it to a bank he is intending to rob. Bud tries to get rid of him by using the SMTV to transform into a criminal himself and join him in the tunnel-digging, but he soon forgets about the plan.
36a	10a	"Meet My Cousin" "(Un cousin qui vous veut du bien)"	Franck Ekinci	Charles Vaucelle	September 23, 2005
A wanted alien named Walter lands in the aliens' house and tells Candy that he is his cousin (even though he is not). This excites Candy, who believes his lie and allows him to stay as a result, but unfortunately for him and the others, he soon ends up taking over the house.
36b	10b	"Who's Who?" "(Qui est qui ?)"	Franck Ekinci	Olivier Jean-Marie	September 30, 2005
When Etno tries out his latest invention, Gorgious' toenail clippers cause time periods to overlap, resulting in the creation of multiple Etnos which end up making Candy lock himself in the bathroom and repeat "There's only one Etno!" over and over to himself on seeing them.
37a	11a	"Pygmy Planet" "(Toute petite la planète)"	Nicolas Gallet	Hugo Gittard	October 7, 2005
Etno accidentally summons a miniature planet which is inhabited by a couple of tiny aliens (named "Pygmy Venusians", a possible throwback to "Venus Junior"). The two Pygmy Venusians then cause trouble for the aliens.
37b	11b	"You Drive Me Crazy!" "(Passe ton code d'abord !)"	Thomas Szabó	François Reczulski	October 14, 2005
Candy, who has transformed himself into a blond woman with the SMTV, is trying to get a driver's license but continually fails miserably. Feeling guilty, the other aliens also transform themselves into humans with the SMTV and try to bribe Parry (Candy's driving instructor).
38a	12a	"A Dog's Life" "(Une vie de chien)"	Nicolas Gallet	Hugo Gittard	October 21, 2005
After Candy decides not to cook, he and the others get the idea of turning themselves into dogs with the SMTV for dog food (as the latest human to move into their house is a dog owner). Unfortunately for Gorgious, he is trained to be a guardian dog and does not get any food.
38b	12b	"Manga Mania"	Olivier Jean-Marie	Charles Vaucelle	October 28, 2005
An anime panda named Panda Manga hides in the aliens' house to get away from crazed fans who want him to sign his autograph for them. But after staying there for a while, he upsets the aliens, so they use the SMTV to transform themselves into 1950s Franco-Belgian cartoon characters Papa Smurf (Candy), Tintin (Etno), Lucky Luke (Bud) and Obélix (Gorgious), scaring him off.
39a	13a	"@spacegoofs.com" "(@zinzins.com)"	Thomas Szabó	François Reczulski	November 4, 2005
Bud develops an addiction to the Internet. When Candy, Etno and Gorgious learn about it, they join him and find it impossible to log off.
39b	13b	"Journey to the Center of the Earth" "(Voyage au centre de la Terre)"	Olivier Jean-Marie	Hugo Gittard	November 11, 2005
After seeing a documentary about volcanoes, the aliens decide to go to the center of the Earth in order to find a source of energy in the form of magma from a volcano that is capable of powering Etno's new rocket. However, after embarking on a 3-day expedition, they find out that getting the energy will not be so easy when they meet a man named Eddy (based on Eddy Merckx) and a fluffy creature named Jerry.
40a	14a	"Abracadabra!" "(Abracadabrantesque !)"	Olivier Jean-Marie	François Reczulski	November 18, 2005
A magician named Marty moves into the aliens' house and performs magic tricks on its lower floor. However, his assistant, Roger, is aware of the fact that his tricks are fake, so the aliens transform themselves into replacement human assistants with the SMTV to join his act.
40b	14b	"Mummy's Boy" "(Fils à maman)"	Franck Ekinci	Charles Vaucelle	November 25, 2005
Etno is on the verge of giving up on trying to get back to Zigma B until a large woman and her son, Norman, move into the house. However, the aliens' attempt to get hold of Norman's getaway project only seems to succeed in bringing Norman and his mother closer to each other.
41a	15a	"Soap Chick Number One" "(Le poussin collector)"	Nicolas Gallet	François Reczulski	December 2, 2005
Bud has developed a new hobby of collecting numbered soap chicks from soap boxes. However, he is only missing one (which is the eponymous "Number One"), and when a new tenant named Thomas Mancini (who is based on Henry Mancini) moves into the aliens' house and apparently has a Number One, Bud tries to steal it but fails. Meanwhile, Etno tries to go back in time to get another Number One for Bud.
41b	15b	"Arctic Intelligence" "(Une froide intelligence)"	François Rosso & Olivier Jean-Marie	Hugo Gittard	December 9, 2005
Because of Bud's blunder that has caused the city to freeze, he and the other aliens are stuck in the form of penguins. A scientist named Professor Etienne then moves into their house studying penguin intelligence and thinks that they would make perfect specimens to examine.
42a	16a	"The Alien" "(Le truc venu d'ailleurs)"	Thomas Szabó	Hugo Gittard	December 16, 2005
The aliens are looking for a flight tester but cannot seem to find a suitable one. Meanwhile, a young alien named Zekla is wishing to try out for the position, but Candy, Etno, Bud and Gorgious all think that, because of the way he appears to them, he is a human in disguise.
42b	16b	"Be My Baby" "(Un amour de cigogne)"	Olivier Derynck	Karim Bayadh	December 23, 2005
When Candy bans Etno from experimenting in the house for a week, he cannot control himself. Meanwhile, a stork's baby hatches from an egg that his mother laid down the house's chimney and thinks, because Etno is the first individual he saw on hatching, that he is his father.
43a	17a	"SOS"	Franck Ekinci	François Reczulski	December 30, 2005
When Etno records a message to space in the hope that other aliens might hear it, travel down to Earth and take them back to Zigma B, two alien hunters named Gregor and Tatiana get hold of it. They then kidnap Etno and demand he inform them where Candy, Bud and Gorgious are.
43b	17b	"The Collector" "(Le collectionneur)"	Olivier Jean-Marie	Hugo Gittard	January 6, 2006
A nerdy collector moves into the aliens' house and might have their original spaceship (as in the one they were travelling in during both seasons' opening sequences). Excited, the aliens try to find out if the spaceship is real in an attempt to get back to their home planet.
44a	18a	"Be My Friend" "(Un ami au poli)"	Nicolas Gallet	Hugo Gittard	January 13, 2006
Candy comes across a diary belonging to a little girl who used to live in the house and incessantly tries to summon the girl's old friend Molux (which is pronounced "Maloo"). When Molux does turn up, he spreads a pungent aroma due to his overgrown hair, so the aliens have to shave it off, and Etno realizes the hair can be used as a fuel for his latest spaceship.
44b	18b	"Time Traveller" "(Le voyageur du temps)"	Nicolas Gallet	François Reczulski	January 20, 2006
Etno uses a time period device to evolve a tadpole into a Neolithic caveman named Ugg. Finding this specimen not very useful, Etno evolves him into a chivalrous Middle Ages knight, a laid-back 21st-century man, and a hyper-intelligent cyborg from the future.
45a	19a	"Back to School Blues" "(Les Zinzins à l'école)"	Olivier Jean-Marie	Charles Vaucelle	January 27, 2006
A school teacher named Mrs. Durante and her pupils have moved into the aliens' house. Candy, Bud and Gorgious want to get rid of her, but Etno hesitates because Bud has not had any education since they landed on Earth. Candy and Gorgious agree with Etno that Bud should start school, so they all transform into pupils with the SMTV and become students.
45b	19b	"Remote Control Home" "(La maison se rebiffe)"	Franck Ekinci	Hugo Gittard	February 3, 2006
Etno installs a robot named Halena in the house to set Candy, Bud and Gorgious straight. But when Gorgious cannot handle her any more and breaks her, she starts taking over the house. Note: A McDonald's-style French fry box that has a yellow X (for "Xilam") on it is shown on the aliens' television screen as Halena's symbol in this episode.
46a	20a	"U.F.O." "(OVNI)"	Olivier Jean-Marie	François Reczulski	February 10, 2006
A family of alien lovers named Marie, Fred, Gustavo and Stephanie Friendly move into the aliens' house and try to make contact with outer space. This excites the aliens, who befriend them, but soon it gets out of hand. Note: Stereo makes his final appearance in this episode.
46b	20b	"Invisible Invaders" "(Invisibles Zinzins)"	Thomas Szabó	Charles Vaucelle	February 17, 2006
The aliens are harassed all day long by Harry, a real estate agent of Harry's Real Estate and Development Company, who wants to buy their house and build a five-story, $5,000 car-parking garage with an Olympic-sized swimming pool where it stands. Etno then decides to perfect his incredible extra-strength invisibility cream that can make the aliens and their house invisible (including Candy as a carrot, Etno as a piece of cheese, Bud as a pickle and Gorgious as a piece of sausage). At the end of the episode, the almost-finished car-parking garage just disappears, but the aliens' house always reappears back the way it is, and when Mr. Edward (Harry's boss) comes to the house to look for Harry's disappeared and unseen parking structure, he rips up his $20 million check and wrecks Harry's car with his longest limousine.
47a	21a	"Inside Gorgious" "(Il faut sauver Gorgious)"	Olivier Jean-Marie	Hugo Gittard	February 24, 2006
Gorgious wakes up with a red bump-like virus known as the "Microbe Microbius" on the front of his head, and the other aliens quarantine him in the washing machine. Although Gorgious' disease is not contagious, it is difficult to cure, so Etno miniaturizes himself with the SMTV and enters Gorgious' inner body to get rid of the Microbe Microbius using Candy's vacuum cleaner.
47b	21b	"Gorilla Island" "(L'île aux singes)"	Thomas Szabó	François Reczulski	March 3, 2006
When the aliens' latest spaceship is struck by a lightning bolt, it crash-lands on an island that is inhabited by fierce gorillas. To the aliens' surprise the island is in the city zoo, but the gorillas have moved into their house, so they have to get them back out of there.
48a	22a	"Welcome!" "(Bienvenue !)"	Olivier Jean-Marie	Olivier Jean-Marie	March 10, 2006
The aliens are finally on their way back to Zigma B, and take time to reminisce on past adventures. However, when they arrive there, they are greeted by an angry Madame Zelza, Colonel Kenny, Crash Test Dummy, Norman and his mother, Princess Zibouya, Collector, Mrs. Durante, the family of alien lovers and Molux, revealing that all of Etno's previous spaceships actually worked. The others start to attack, forcing the aliens to retreat back into their spaceship, which Etno reveals only has two destinations programmed into it (Zigma B and Earth), so they have no choice but to return to Earth. Note: This episode is a clip show.
48b	22b	"Dr. Artichoke & Mister Candy" "(Docteur Artichaut et Mister Candy)"	Thomas Szabó	François Reczulski	March 17, 2006
To complete his vitamin encyclopedia, Etno gets Candy to taste a syrup which was left behind by the house's most recent tenant, a certain Dr. Jekyll. Candy finds that it tastes of artichoke, but during the night, he transforms into an evil, angry version of himself who attacks the others.
49a	23a	"Buffalo Blues" "(Des plumes dans la prairie)"	Olivier Jean-Marie	François Reczulski	March 24, 2006
A Native American named Nanook and his pet buffalo move into the aliens' house. Nanook sets up his tepee in the lounge, while his buffalo eats the plants. Candy loses it, while the others watch with curiosity. Nanook says that the house is on the land of his ancestors and he is not leaving. In an attempt to get rid of Nanook, the aliens go back in time to the 17th century (which was the time of his ancestors).
49b	23b	"24H"	Nicolas Gallet	Hugo Gittard	March 31, 2006
Bud accidentally breaks the SMTV and is transformed into a human. Candy, Etno and Gorgious must then help their friend return to his normal form within twenty-four hours, because if he does not, he will have no choice but to stay a human forever.
50a	24a	"The Alien King" "(Le roi des Zinzins)"	Franck Ekinci	Hugo Gittard	April 7, 2006
A spaceman named Colonel Fédor Zakouski plans on going into space but lands in the aliens' house instead. Thinking that he is on another planet, he makes the aliens bow down to and worship him. Note: This episode's name is a parody of The Lion King.
50b	24b	"Doodle" "(Gribouillages)"	Olivier Jean-Marie	Charles Vaucelle	April 14, 2006
Bud finds an old childhood doodle and raises it like his own, while the others try to find its original artist. Note: As the third Oggy reference, Oggy, his cousin Jack and three cockroaches (Dee Dee, Marky and Joey) can be seen in two pictures during this episode, along with all four of the aliens in their forms of 1950s Franco-Belgian comic characters, Papa Smurf, Tintin, Lucky Luke and Obélix on five posters.
51a	25a	"Gorgious the 1st" "(Gorgious 1er)"	Olivier Jean-Marie	François Reczulski	April 21, 2006
Gorgious wants to be the boss of something, given that Candy, Etno and Bud all are. He then meets a tough-talking mouse who makes him the boss of the house.
51b	25b	"Space Sailors" "(Les marins de l'espace)"	Olivier Jean-Marie	Hugo Gittard	April 28, 2006
The aliens decide to sail away from the city in order to get away from humans. Unfortunately for them, a man who has been lost at sea and his wooden girlfriend (a figurehead of a mermaid from a galleon which he named "Simone") find their house and automatically move into it. Note: As the fourth Oggy reference, Joey, Marky and Dee Dee appear in this episode for a quick gag.
52a	26a	"Fairy Tale" "(Conte de fée)"	Franck Ekinci	François Reczulski	May 5, 2006
The Big Bad Wolf from the folk story of Little Red Riding Hood moves into the aliens' house and tries to eat them. Note: Jack the Giantkiller, Snow White and Prince Charming also appear in this episode.
52b	26b	"The Alien Show" "(Le Zinzin Show)"	Thomas Szabó & Olivier Jean-Marie	François Reczulski	May 12, 2006
In the series finale, the aliens go on a reality show called "Lost Story" (a parody of Loft Story, itself a retooling of the Dutch-created Big Brother) that's hosted by a friend of Etno's to receive a flying saucer as a prize and finally go back home. Note: As the final Oggy reference, a clip from "Love and Kisses" is shown on the aliens' television screen in this segment, featuring Oggy and his almost-identical twin sister Monica.

== Production ==
Series co-creator Jean-Yves Raimbaud first conceived Space Goofs, initially titled Maison à louer (Home to Rent), as one of several personal projects before meeting Gaumont producer Marc du Pontavice at the 1993 Annecy International Animation Film Festival. du Pontavice took interest in the Home to Rent concept and saw potential for it to become an animated series. While discussing the show with du Pontavice, Raimbaud mentioned the American Nickelodeon series The Ren & Stimpy Show, a show that du Pontavice had never heard of before but was nevertheless impressed and captivated by its characters and groundbreaking animation. Ren & Stimpy would serve as a template to the direction and tone of Space Goofs. Raimbaud would become the first artist hired by du Pontavice.

By late-1994, du Pontavice traveled throughout the United States to present several projects being worked on, including Space Goofs. All of the sets and concept art were developed by co-creator Philippe Traversat. Marc du Pontavice eventually negotiated with CBS in Los Angeles to produce the show for the network. Although initially happy, du Pontavice eventually backed out of the deal when he learned that CBS planned to have total editorial control and impose its creators. Instead, he agreed with France 3 to produce the series. Bertrand Mosca, the then-general director of France 2, agreed to commit to the series against the advice from his colleagues, and he gives it the largest budget ever granted to a public service animated series. The budget for the first season was $10 million.

Raimbaud would recruit several former Ren & Stimpy staffers as writers for the first season, including showrunner Bob Camp and writer Jim Gomez, who would also provide voice direction from Los Angeles. Gomez brought voice actors for the English dub of the show, such as Charlie Adler (Candy), Maurice LaMarche (Etno), Michael Sicoly and Danny Mann (Gorgious), Jeff Bennett (Bud and Stereo), and several others. In addition to the American series team, there was Olivier Jean-Marie in animation direction, who was appointed by Carbunkle Cartoons founders, Bob Jaques and Kelly Armstrong, Thomas Szabó in storyboarding, Nicolas Gallet in scriptwriting, Hugo Gittard in character design, and Hughes Mahoas in set design. Du Pontavice's wife, Alix de Maistre, was chosen by him to work as post-production supervisor on the first season. For the show's theme song, Raimbaud suggested David Bowie to sing it, of whom he was a big fan, but since Bowie was very busy, he came up with Iggy Pop instead. A remix of the theme song, made by 2 Lazy, was also released.

Jaques and Armstrong, who worked on Ren & Stimpy, were also convinced to spend a year in Paris to write and train younger talent. The series team later discovered that Jaques and Armstrong were stealing some sheets of the sent material to disrupt production and force it to proceed as they wished. They later left the series and refused to put their names on the series against the advice of their agent. The series was originally going to use the original Home to Rent title, but it was renamed Space Goofs at the last minute at the request of Fox.

In 2005, a second season was commissioned for the series, this time produced by Xilam Animation, a company of which du Pontavice and de Maistre have founded. Xilam was able to bring back most of the key voice actors with the exception of Bennett, resulting in Gomez replacing him as the voice of Bud. Stereo would also be removed in this season as a main character, as Xilam considered him a weak character, with him only appearing in two episodes. Season 2 would be aired on France 3 from May 20, 2005, to May 12, 2006.

== Broadcast and home media ==
Space Goofs also debuted in the same year in Germany on ProSieben, and aired in Canada on Teletoon. In the UK, the first season premiered worldwide on Fox Kids on August 31, 1997 and 3 weeks later on Channel 4 on September 21, 1997, both under the show's original title of Home to Rent. The second season premiered under the series' final name on Nicktoons UK on November 5, 2005 at 9:30 AM. Furthermore, the first season aired as part of the Fox Kids lineup on Fox in the United States. The show premiered on the same day on France 3 in France and on the Fox Kids block in the United States on September 6, 1997.

Of the more notable physical releases, three VHS tapes (entitled Alien Antics, Cartoon Tales and Animal Crack-Ups) of the series were released in the U.S. on August 11, 1998. The complete series (in 2 season sets) was also released in France on June 13, 2011.

== In other media ==
=== Video game ===
An adventure game based on Space Goofs named Stupid Invaders was released in 2000–2001 by Ubisoft. It featured crew members from its first season and the voice actors of its English dub as the five aliens, having to go back home in a surreal world, after an infiltration by a bounty hunter named Bolok (voiced by Billy West). Development of the game initially began at Gaumont through Gaumont Multimédia before the studio was shut down by Gaumont in 1999, and it was originally slated for release in December 1999.

=== Canceled film adaptation ===
A film adaptation for the show, also titled Stupid Invaders, was planned, but was never released for reasons unknown – what only remained was a short video posted online. The cast of the original show reprised their roles for the main characters (without Stereo). It was a CGI-animated adaptation of the show, where the four aliens (Etno, Candy, Gorgious and Bud) have ended up accidentally crash landing into someone else's house. Said house is revealed to be inhabited by an unnamed brunette girl, who gets curious upon her sight of the aliens.

=== Comics ===
In Germany, a comic book based on the series was released on September 30, 1998 by Dino Entertainment (Dino Verlag). On March 10, 2006, the series was adapted into comic books in France. Only two volumes were released by Jungle.
