= Oggy and the Cockroaches: Next Generation =

Season of television series

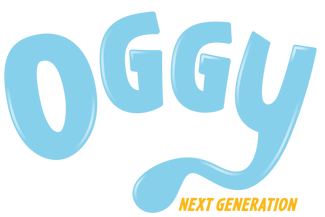
- Oggy et les Cafards: Nouvelle Génération
- Genre: Slapstick comedy
- Based on: Oggy and the Cockroaches by Jean-Yves Raimbaud
- Directed by: Khalil Ben Naamane
- Music by: Vincent Artaud
- Opening theme: Credit Theme (remix)
- Ending theme: Credit Theme (remix) (Shortened)
- Country of origin: France
- No. of episodes: 13 (78 segments)

Production
- Executive producer: Marc du Pontavice
- Producer: Marc du Pontavice
- Running time: 22 minutes 43 minutes (Netflix)
- Production company: Xilam Animation

Original release
- Network: Gulli (France); Netflix (Worldwide)
- Release: 8 November 2021

Related
- Oggy and the Cockroaches; Oggy Oggy

Oggy and the Cockroaches: Next Generation (French: Oggy et les Cafards : Nouvelle Génération) is a French animated series produced by Xilam for the streaming service Netflix. It is the eighth season of Oggy and the Cockroaches, and serves as a reboot to it. Like the original series, it focuses on the wacky antics of Oggy and a trio of mischievous cockroaches that inhabit his house. Aside from the titular characters, the series also introduces the seven-year-old Piya, an optimistic elephant from India whom Oggy has to look after. The series premiered on Gulli in France on November 8, 2021, followed by a worldwide release on Netflix on July 28, 2022.

Unlike the previous seasons and Oggy Oggy, both of which have episodes that last 22 minutes and contain three self-contained segments, Next Generation's episodes last for 43 minutes with six segments each on Netflix. This is not the case for Gulli, however. The series drastically tones itself down compared to the original, with a focus on Oggy's friendship with Piya, and is visualized with a more geometric style.

== Plot ==
Oggy is an anthropomorphic cat living in the modern suburbs of Animville. He would like to live an average, everyday life, but he shares his home with roaches Joey, Dee Dee and Marky – three trouble-making, mischievous tricksters who usually desire to cause him trouble and drive him insane in a variety of ways. Oggy also has Indian friends who are on vacation, dropping off their daughter, optimistic seven-year-old elephant Piya, for him to look after.

With a new roommate, Oggy also takes on the responsibility of caring for Piya and becomes a father figure to her. Piya, unaware of the cockroaches' intentions, believes them to be Oggy's welcome visitors. The cockroaches take advantage of Piya's trust to further their pranks on Oggy. This leaves Oggy balancing his responsibilities toward Piya while attempting to deal with the cockroaches' schemes.

== Characters ==
The characters from the original series receive changes for the reboot. Jack, and Olivia's roles are reduced, Oggy and Olivia's relationship remains as boyfriend and girlfriend (as they were husband and wife in the original series' season 4 finale), Bob now lives with Kevin, a new character, and some characters have received personality changes – some of them having redesigns; many being simplified.

=== Main ===
- Oggy is a light blue cat with detachable black ears, green eyes and a red nose. Unlike the original series, he does not wear gloves and his ears are redesigned to look more feline-like (rather than antennae-like as shown in the original series). He is Piya's caring father figure, who is laid-back and cautious of the cockroaches – he is especially protective over Piya and any of his personal belongings. Although he is usually calm and collected, he can get a little goofy. Oggy keeps a collection of various yarn-based items and goes fishing as a regular hobby. He is still the main arch-nemesis of the cockroaches, who he is easily annoyed by. He is also the current caretaker of Piya, seen as her uncle – he met her ever since she was still a baby.
- The Cockroaches are the eponymous trio who live with Oggy and frequently annoy him. They are not as absurd and extreme with their pranks, but are still as mischievous as ever. Instead of usually being inside dirty-looking vents, they freely roam around Oggy's house. They follow Oggy wherever he goes, usually to steal some food. In the series, they are Piya's playmates and don't let Piya know of the things they do. In spite of their antics, several episodes see that the cockroaches can be nicer at times.
  - Joey is the leader. He has a left pink and right yellow eye (inverted from their original colorations), a light purple head and a pink body. While he is the smartest, he can get too eager, especially when it comes to the cockroaches' pranks. He is not as hot-headed as the original incarnation.
  - Marky has long, thin, curly antennae, pink eyes, a light green head and a grey body. He has a generic role like in the original series, mainly assisting Joey and Dee Dee, but he is shown to have an additional interest in cowboys. He can also get oddly attached to specific objects, like Piya's doll in "The Lost Doll" (to the point where he annoys Joey and Dee Dee) and a light in "Creature Comforts".
  - Dee Dee has light green eyes, a large orange head, and a fat blue body (much pudgier than his original design). He mostly assists Joey and Marky throughout the series and also is usually the most gluttonous of the cockroaches, to the point where he will eat things that are unpalatable, or otherwise inedible.
- Piya (voiced by Kaycie Chase) is an optimistic and cheerful Indian elephant. Peach-pink and fat in build, she wears a pink and yellow shirt, with dark brown hair tied into a braided ponytail. She acts like a typical child – often having a playful yet gullible demeanor and unintentionally adding onto Oggy's daily struggles. She is also a protective neat freak with a fear of spiders. A variety of gags revolve around her trunk, whether it's using as an extra hand or to blow strong winds. She is Oggy's "niece" and sometimes the cockroaches' playmate, mostly unaware of what they do and usually seeing them as innocent – until they either go too far or get her in trouble with Oggy, usually causing her to turn against them.

=== Recurring ===
- Jack is a tall green cat who is Oggy's cousin. Unlike the previous series where he was a major supporting character, he has a minor role in this reboot, only appearing in six episodes.
- Olivia is a white cat, one of Oggy's neighbours and his girlfriend. She is redesigned to look less like Oggy and her ears are also redesigned to look more feline-like, but also lacks her yellow bow (possibly a result of the designs being simplified). She doesn't like nature, unlike her previous counterpart.
- Bob is a large brown bulldog with a red, spiked collar, one of Oggy's neighbours and Kevin's uncle. He is still very hostile towards Oggy, but he also cares a lot for Kevin, to the point where in "Dog Day Afternoon", he constantly sobs hysterically after his nephew leaves for school.
- Kevin is a small, orange puppy with a blue nose, and Bob's nephew. Kevin sometimes will make fun of Oggy, but other times, he won't – like when he agrees to challenge himself in obtaining a fishing-related badge in "Scout's Honor".
- Piya's parents are Indian elephants and one a greyish-blue and one greyish-purple, respectively – are very large to the point where their faces aren't properly visible. They are friends of Oggy, though they aren't seen often. Ever since they dropped off Piya at Oggy's house, they went on vacation for a long time. They are easily entertained by Oggy (as his distractions) when they came to check on their daughter, in "Please Hold!" – he also assumed they were overprotective over their daughter.
- A grizzly bear lives in a forest far away from the city. It lives carefree unless provoked, as it can become comically aggressive. As such, it once interfered with Oggy and Piya's camping grounds.

== Episode list ==
In the title cards, the English titles do not have any extra capitalization.

No.	Title	Written by	Storyboarded by	Original release date
1a	"Out of Order"	Hugo Gittard	Khalil Ben Naamane	July 28, 2022
Piya is wrecking Oggy's house, but then she realizes that this is bad for him and works everywhere and makes everything perfect.
1b	"A Day Out"	Nicolas Gallet	Jérôme Fardini	July 28, 2022
Oggy, Piya, and the roaches go out on a trip near a forest. Piya isn't paying attention to nature, because she is playing a game on her phone- that was, until the battery ran out. To make matters worse, Oggy's car isn't working. But have no fear! Oggy sees this as the chance to take Piya (with Marky and Dee Dee in tow, while Joey is fixing Oggy's car) to enjoy the world of Mother Nature.
1c	"Pyjama Party"	Boris Guilloteau; Annabelle Gervais	Amaury Allaire	July 28, 2022
Piya doesn't want to go to sleep, which is only enhanced by the roaches' attempts to make her stay up and ruin Oggy's night.
1d	"The Canary's Song"	Khalil Ben Naamane; Branca Cepelowicz	Jérôme Fardini	July 28, 2022
Piya wants a canary to sing for her, but the cockroaches mess with the canary's cage.
1e	"Wool Ball Madness"	Anastasia Heinzl	Léa Cousty	July 28, 2022
Piya gets a package at Oggy's front door which contains a ball of yarn. Oggy quickly falls in love with the ball.
1f	"Mustache Man"	Clément Savoyat	Christophe Pinto	July 28, 2022
2a	"Dear Diary"	Julien Dinse	Fabrice Guével	July 28, 2022
The roaches find Piya' Diary, and they draw on it to make Oggy think that Piya thinks that he's being mean to the Roaches.
2b	"End of the Line"	Yani Ouabdesselam	Anh-Tu Cao	July 28, 2022
2c	"Little Spoiled Neighbor"	Hugo Gittard	Christophe Pinto	July 28, 2022
Oggy's new neighbor, Kevin, is being a bully to Oggy and Piya.
2d	"Nice Little Bear"	Boris Guilloteau; Annabelle Gervais	Christophe Pinto	July 28, 2022
2e	"Water Rush"	Hugo Gittard	Léa Cousty	July 28, 2022
2f	"Ding-Dong"	Yani Ouabdesselam	Richard Méril	July 28, 2022
3a	"Aliens Welcome"	Nicolas Gallet	Richard Méril	July 28, 2022
Aliens visits Oggy's house- But Piya knows they're the roaches in disguise.
3b	"Raw Talent"	Yani Ouabdesselam	Amaury Allaire	July 28, 2022
Oggy is having a date with Olivia. And Piya is in charge of making food that has Olivia's face on it. Surprisingly, Roach Dee Dee does it very well.
3c	"Funny Friend"	Hugo Gittard	Fabrice Guével	July 28, 2022
3d	"Invincible Piya"	Léo Bocard	Jérôme Fardini	July 28, 2022
Oggy, Piya, and the cockroaches are playing some games together. The only problem is that Piya wins every time.
3e	"Creature Comfort"	Khalil Ben Naamane; Branca Cepelowicz	Richard Méril	July 28, 2022
Marky lost a bet to Joey and Dee Dee on which Roach will go raid Oggy's fridge. But he leaves the kitchen because Oggy locked the fridge. But Marky found the solution to his problems: He gets oddly attached to Piya's lamp and Piya lets him borrow it. Joey and Dee Dee? They are very, very, frustrated.
3f	"Safety First"	Julien Dinse	Fabrice Guével	July 28, 2022
4a	"Bad Hair Day"	Boris Guilloteau; Annabelle Gervais	Gaël Le Gourrierec	July 28, 2022
4b	"Unhappy Campers"	Anastasia Heinzl	Fabrice Guével	July 28, 2022
4c	"The Cone"	Anastasia Heinzl	Jérôme Fardini	July 28, 2022
4d	"The Hat of Shame"	Nicolas Gallet	Amaury Allaire	July 28, 2022
4e	"Roller Skates"	Clément Savoyat	Richard Méril	July 28, 2022
4f	"Bye-Bye, Cockroaches"	Boris Guilloteau; Annabelle Gervais	Fabrice Guével	July 28, 2022
5a	"Eek, a Clown!"	Léo Bocard	Jérôme Fardini	July 28, 2022
The roaches find out that Oggy has a fear of clowns.
5b	"The Last Flower"	Nicolas Gallet	Richard Méril	July 28, 2022
5c	"Contagious"	Philippe Riche	Christophe Pinto	July 28, 2022
5d	"Piya's House"	Nicolas Gallet	Amaury Allaire	July 28, 2022
5e	"Oggy's Relaxing Day"	Anastasia Heinzl	Léa Cousty	July 28, 2022
5f	"Birthday Truce"	Léo Bocard	Richard Méril	July 28, 2022
6a	"Ach-Who?"	Léo Bocard	Léa Cousty	July 28, 2022
6b	"The Lost Doll"	Philippe Riche	Christophe Pinto	July 28, 2022
Marky suddenly finds Piya's beloved doll- after an angry Joey and Dee Dee threw his harmonica into the garbage. But Oggy was the one who threw Piya's doll because he thought it smelled bad! Can he find Piya's doll before Piya finds out?
6c	"The Hiking Guide"	Nicolas Gallet	Léa Cousty	July 28, 2022
Oggy leads the crew on a scary hike.
6d	"Piya Takes to the Moon"	Nicolas Gallet	Jérôme Fardini	July 28, 2022
6e	"Please Hold!"	Nicolas Gallet	Romain Cislo	July 28, 2022
6f	"Long Face"	Boris Guilloteau	Léa Cousty	July 28, 2022
7a	"One More Picture?"	Hugo Gittard	Léa Cousty	July 28, 2022
Oggy needs to take pictures of Piya before she leaves for school.
7b	"Timber!"	Nicolas Gallet	Romain Cislo	July 28, 2022
7c	"The Itsy-Bitsy Spider"	Boris Guilloteau; Annabelle Gervais	Amaury Allaire	July 28, 2022
7d	"Elephant Nanny"	Renaud Gagnon	Richard Méril	July 28, 2022
Jack is in charge of watching Piya while Oggy is going out. He's doing it fine, causing zero destruction to the house and Piya. But the roaches want to cause as much destruction as possible so Oggy can kick his own cousin out and they, alongside Piya can live it up tonight with no responsibilities! But watch out boys, Jack and Piya are coming to stop you.
7e	"The Friend Thief"	Boris Guilloteau; Annabelle Gervais	Jérôme Fardini	July 28, 2022
7f	"Paint and Suffering"	Renaud Gagnon	Amaury Allaire	July 28, 2022
8a	"The Arrival"	Laury Rovelli; Khalil Ben Naamane	Léa Cousty	July 28, 2022
A flashback episode of how Piya came to Oggy's house. Oggy is excited to have to take care of his Indian friends' baby daughter, Piya. But she's grown a bit since the last time Oggy saw her. While Oggy must do what ever he can to keep Piya happy, his rivals, the cockroaches, Dee Dee, Joey, and Marky, sees Piya as an opportunity to bring more havoc to Oggy's life.
8b	"On Strike"	Annabelle Gervais; Anastasia Heinzl	Christophe Pinto	July 28, 2022
Oggy's disappointed on how Piya's behavior is when she's with the roaches, so he decides to never EVER clean his own home again for now on. The roaches are relieved of this: They can do whatever they want, with no Oggy getting rid of them! Piya, meanwhile, is worried about her caretaker's current behavior...
8c	"The Amazing Oggy"	Khalil Ben Naamane; Branca Cepelowicz	Yann Provost	July 28, 2022
8d	"In a Pickle!"	Nicolas Gallet	Léa Cousty	July 28, 2022
The cockroaches are trapped in Bob's garbage can.
8e	"The Secret Garden"	Anastasia Heinzl	Romain Cislo	July 28, 2022
Piya finds out that Oggy has a very secret garden- but he refuses to let Piya in.
8f	"Split-Second"	Clément Savoyat	Jérôme Fardini	July 28, 2022
Oggy is having a date with Olivia the same day he's supposed to take Piya ziplineng in the forest.
9a	"The Butler"	Jean Harlez	Caroline Lefevre	July 28, 2022
Dee Dee suddenly gets memory loss after being hit by a painting of Oggy's butler ancestor. He now is cleaning Oggy's house, and Piya, Joey and Marky team up to stop the newly neat Dee Dee and bring the old Dee Dee back.
9b	"The Best Uncle"	Nicolas Gallet	Richard Méril	July 28, 2022
9c	"A Treasured Secret"	Hugo Gittard	Fabrice Guével	July 28, 2022
9d	"Sibling Rivalry"	Christophe Le Borgne	Yann Provost	July 28, 2022
9e	"Runner Up"	Annabelle Gervais; Anastasia Heinzl	Romain Cislo	July 28, 2022
9f	"Mischief Mishaps"	Nicolas Gallet	Jérôme Fardini	July 28, 2022
10a	"Find the Top!"	Léo Bocard	Yann Provost	July 28, 2022
10b	"Dog Day Afternoon"	Nicolas Gallet	Yann Provost	July 28, 2022
10c	"A Dreadful Date"	Nicolas Gallet	Léa Cousty	July 28, 2022
Oggy tries to make up with Olivia after a disastrous date, but Piya's well-meaning attempts to help and outside forces keep getting in the way.
10d	"A Restless Night"	Alexandre Simard	Romain Cislo	July 28, 2022
10e	"Teeny-Tiny Oggy"	Annabelle Gervais; Branca Cepelowicz	Jérôme Fardini	July 28, 2022
10f	"Venting Frustration"	Fanny Courtillot	Jérôme Fardini	July 28, 2022
11a	"Scout's Honor"	Khalil Ben Naamane; Branca Cepelowicz	Jérôme Fardini	July 28, 2022
11b	"Super Oggy"	Renaud Gagnon	Romain Cislo	July 28, 2022
11c	"The Mooncat"	Fanny Courtillot	Yann Provost	July 28, 2022
11d	"Copycat"	Léa Cousty	Léa Cousty	July 28, 2022
11e	"It Wasn't Me!"	Nicolas Gallet	Caroline Lefevre	July 28, 2022
11f	"Puppet Show"	Léo Bocard	Léa Cousty	July 28, 2022
12a	"Package Deal"	Fanny Courtillot	Romain Cislo	July 28, 2022
12b	"Butterflies Only!"	Boris Guilloteau; Alexandre Simard	Jérôme Fardini	July 28, 2022
12c	"Princess Piya"	Nicolas Gallet	Caroline Lefevre	July 28, 2022
12d	"Off the Rails"	Khalil Ben Naamane; Branca Cepelowicz	Jérôme Fardini	July 28, 2022
12e	"Wrestling the Past"	Jean Harlez	Léa Cousty	July 28, 2022
12f	"Bad Uncle!"	Christophe Le Borgne	Yann Provost	July 28, 2022
13a	"A Swell Outing"	Alexandre Simard; Phillipe Riche	Caroline Lefevre	July 28, 2022
13b	"Ice Cream!"	Alexandre Simard	Fabrice Guével	July 28, 2022
Piya tries all sorts of hijinks to grab ice cream instead of Oggy's food.
13c	"The Imposter"	Phillipe Riche	Romain CIslo	July 28, 2022
Oggy dresses up in a Piya costume to fool the roaches.
13d	"Dressed to Impress"	Phillipe Riche	Anh Tu Cao; Fabrice Guével	July 28, 2022
13e	"Oggy Gets Jacked"	Phillipe Riche	Yann Provost	July 28, 2022
13f	"Mammoth Problem"	Alexandre Simard	Romain CIslo	July 28, 2022

== Production ==
Like the previous seasons, this series also lacks any actual dialogue – characters frequently express themselves with a variety of noises. Voices were provided by Hugues Le Bars, within re-used audio clips for the eponymous characters, and Kaycie Chase as Piya, the latter of whom also performed the opening theme. Due to Le Bars' passing, some new audio for Oggy and the cockroach trio was recorded – the voice actor currently remains unknown. Vincent Artaud – who also became the new composer for Zig & Sharko, among other Xilam titles – also returns for this new incarnation.

== Broadcast ==
The series was first distributed online on Gulli's French streaming services and its official app on November 8, 2021. However, it was labelled as Oggy and the Cockroaches' eighth season. The series premiered worldwide on Netflix, on July 28, 2022. The series had its linear broadcast on Sony YAY! in India, K2 in Italy, and Trans7 in Indonesia.
