= Moka's Fabulous Adventures! =

French animated television series

- Genre: Comedy; Adventure
- Created by: Andrès Fernandez; Maxence Sani
- Directed by: Andrès Fernandez
- Voices of: Barbara Weber-Scaff
- Composer: Vincent Artaud
- Country of origin: France
- Original languages: English; French
- No. of seasons: 1
- No. of episodes: 78

Production
- Executive producer: Marc du Pontavice
- Producer: Marc du Pontavice
- Editors: Patrick Phelpin; Amélie Degouys
- Running time: 7 minutes
- Production company: Xilam Animation

Original release
- Network: Gulli
- Release: 4 January 2020 – 2020

Moka's Fabulous Adventures! (French: Moka) is a French animated television series created by Andres Fernandez and Maxence Sani. The series was produced by Xilam Animation with the participation of Gulli and Super RTL and premiered on 4 January 2020.

== Plot ==
Moka, the King of the Savannah's son, a naive and reckless little crocodile, leaves home one day to go explore his kingdom. Cherry, a brave rhinoceros from the Royal Guard, is sent along to ensure his protection. But much to her despair, Moka's curiosity and impulsive behavior repeatedly get them into trouble.

== Characters ==
- Moka (voiced by Dorothée Pousséo in French and Barbara Weber-Scaff in English) is the enthusiastic prince of the Savannah, being optimistic, goodhearted, outgoing, energetic, sociable, overly helpful and impulsive, blusterous, and occasionally annoying to the more levelheaded people around him. The son of King Gator, he aspires to explore his expansive kingdom and help people around him, in opposition to the caution and experience displayed by his traveling companion Cherry. Eternally given to his reckless attitude and beliefs to help people unconditionally, Moka is often oblivious and inattentive to danger and will throw himself into dangerous situations at a moment's notice without thinking things through properly in his many expeditions, preferring to think with his impulses rather than his brain. Moka is a short, blue crocodile who is usually seen with an easily identifiable miniature crown placed comically on his back rather than his head (Cherry is very protective of the crown, alongside the map the dynamic duo use as a guide throughout their travels). While he causes tons of comedic trouble for Cherry and lives in his own little world more often than not, he's ultimately presented as a well-meaning guy who cares for Cherry like an older sister or mother, rarely displays any greedy, envious or untrustworthy tendencies, and is self-aware enough to rein his wackiness in and acknowledge that it isn't always appropriate after being made aware that he's taking his antics too far. There are also instances where he can act fairly normal and clever in spite of his primary naivety and action-hungry, destructive, somewhat incompetent nature (e.g. "Shortcut for the Abyss").
- Cherry (voiced by Olivia Luccioni in French and Barbara Weber-Scaff in English, originally named Cerise) is a wise, brave and marginally sarcastic rhinoceros from the kingdom's Royal Guard with a long horn protruding from her snout and a rock hoisted around her chest who functions as Moka's guardian, surrogate mother, parent figure and best friend. She explores and travels the kingdom with him, acting as his designated protector and always being there to help him when he inevitably puts himself in highly treacherous circumstances. She is quite haughty and carries herself with an air of stoicism, and though her closed-off nature can cause her to come off as ill-tempered, stubborn, inconsiderate, reckless, and cynical at times, she has a softer side and is dedicated to ensuring the protection of the prince (she became quite emotional upon thinking that he died in "The Howling Canyon"). She often attempts to educate Moka about the perils of the landscapes they encounter, to varying levels of success, and serves as the voice of reason to some of his more hare-brained or improbable ideas.

== Episodes ==
No.	English title (top) French title (bottom)	Written by	Storyboard by	Original release date	U.S. release date
1	"Kushka and the Warrior Lionesses" "Koushka et les Lionnes Guerrières"	Andres Fernandez	Andres Fernandez	January 4, 2020	TBA
2	"The Dreaded Desert of Discomfort" "L'Impitoyable Désert de l'inconfort"	Fanny Courtillot	Andres Fernandez	TBA	TBA
3	"The Tide of Treachery" "La Baie du Péril"	Andres Fernandez	Andres Fernandez	TBA	TBA
4	"The Marvellous Marble" "La Bille Merveilleuse Grottes Nacre"	Julien Dinse	Cédric Dietsch	TBA	TBA
5	"Sheep in the Mist" "Mouton dans la Brume"	Fanny Courtillot	Anh Tu Cao	TBA	TBA
6	"Hunt for the Fruit of Heroes" "À la Poursuite du Fruit du Héros"	Antoine Colomb	Richard Méril	TBA	TBA
7	"The Blistering Blizzard of Oblivion" "Le Blizzard de l'oubli"	Sophie Lodwitz	Laury Rovelli	TBA	TBA
8	"The Fated Flight of the Albatross" "Inéluctable De Les Albatros"	Antoine Colomb	Aude Massot	TBA	TBA
9	"The Sickness of Sorrow" "La Maladie du Malheur"	Fanny Courtillot	Louis Musso	TBA	TBA
10	"The Spider's Sneaky Snare" "Le Piège Sournois de l'Araignée"	Patrick Imbert	Anh Tu Cao	TBA	TBA
11	"The Unfathomable Crater of Memory" "L'Insondable Cratère des Souvenirs"	Victor Coutard	Richard Méril	TBA	TBA
12	"Prince and the Fabulous Unicorn" "Le Prince et La Licorne Fabuleuse"	Antoine Colomb	Laury Rovelli	TBA	TBA
13	"The Howling Canyon" "Le Canyon au Vent Hurlant"	Jordan Raux	Louis Musso	TBA	TBA
14	"Adventurers of the Lost Friendship" "Les Aventurières de l'Amitié Perdue"	Sophie Lodwitz	Aude Massot	TBA	TBA
15	"The Hidden Treasure of the Oasis" "Trésor Oublié Oasis"	Antoine Colomb	Richard Méril	TBA	TBA
16	"The Wondrous Warriors of Bockenburg" "Les Glorieux Guerries de Bouckenburg"	Victor Coutard	Anh Tu Cao	TBA	TBA
17	"The Relentless Crawl of the Turtle" "L'Implacable Avancée de la Tortue"	Alice Boucherit	Fabrice Guével	TBA	TBA
18	"The Legendary Armor of the Ancients" "La Légendaire Armure des Anciens"	Jordan Raux	Louis Musso	TBA	TBA
19	"The Crystals of Discordance" "Les Cruels Cristaux de la Querelle"	Fanny Courtillot	Laury Rovelli	TBA	TBA
20	"Night of the Gargantula" "La Nuit du Gargantueur"	Julien Dinse	Aude Massot	TBA	TBA
21	"The Gnus' Stupendous Stampede" "La Farouche Chevauchée des Gnous"	Baljeet Rai	Andres Fernandez; Cédric Dietsch	TBA	TBA
22	"The Climb of Shivering Heights" "L'Insoutenable Ascension des Frissons"	Julien Dinse	Fabrice Guével	TBA	TBA
23	"The Question of Titfortat" "La Question de Takotak"	Julien Dinse	Richard Méril	TBA	TBA
24	"The Inn of the Final Feast" "L'Auberge du Dernier Festin"	Victor Coutard	Anh Tu Cao	TBA	TBA
25	"The Bag of One Thousand and One Treasures" "Le Sac des Mille et Une Trésors"	Fanny Courtillot	Louis Musso	TBA	TBA
26	"The Waterfall of No Return" "La Cascade dont on ne Revient Jamais"	Alice Boucherit	Boris Guilloteau	TBA	TBA
27	"The Secret Technique of Tamarok" "La Technique Secrète de Tamarok"	Antoine Colomb	Richard Méril	TBA	TBA
28	"Prince Moka's Impossible Bath" "L'Impossible Bain du Prince Moka"	Jordan Raux	Fabrice Guével	TBA	TBA
29	"Tale Of the Map of the Ancients" "Le Conte de la Carte des Anciens"	Antoine Colomb	Anh Tu Cao	TBA	TBA
30	"The Puzzle of the Perfect Present" "Le Casse-Tête du Cadeau Parfait"	Pierre Le Gall; Thomas Mazingue	Christophe Pinto	TBA	TBA
31	"The Secret of the Nameless Abyss" "La Secrète du Gouffre sans Nom"	Sophie Lodwitz	Laury Rovelli	TBA	TBA
32	"The Swamp of Romp and Tromp" "Le Marécage des Enfantillages"	Fanny Courtillot	Fabrice Guével	TBA	TBA
33	"The Heir of the Ice Empress" "L'Héritier de l'Impératrice des Glaces"	Fanny Courtillot	Christophe Pinto	TBA	TBA
34	"The Appalling Abduction of the Prince" "L'Épouvantable Enlèvement du Prince"	Patrick Imbert	Boris Guilloteau	TBA	TBA
35	"The Mark of a Hero" "La Marque des Héros"	Cédric Stéphan	Anh Tu Cao	TBA	TBA
36	"Call of the Thousand-Year-Old Forest" "L'Appel de la Forêt Millénaire"	Pierre Le Gall; Thomas Mazingue	Richard Méril	TBA	TBA
37	"Captain Moka's Great Journey" "La Grande Traversée du Capitaine Moka"	Julien Dinse	Amaury Allaire	TBA	TBA
38	"The Thundercloud of the Switcharoo" "Le Nuage de la Métamorfoudre"	Fanny Courtillot	Anh Tu Cao	TBA	TBA
39	"Menace of the Mega Moles" "Le Territoire des Taupes Terrifiantes"	Chloé Sastre; Romain Gadiou	Fabrice Guével	TBA	TBA
40	"Dance of the Desert of Death" "La Dance du Désert Desséchant"	Antoine Colomb	Amaury Allaire	TBA	TBA
41	"The Peak of Ultimate Vertigo" "Le Pic du Vertige Ultime"	Romain Gadiou; Chloé Sastre	Boris Guilloteau	TBA	TBA
42	"The Pride of the Castaway" "L'Orgueil de La Naufragé"	Antoine Colomb	Richard Méril	TBA	TBA
43	"The Indestructible Dam of Justice" "L'Inébranlable Barrage de la Justice"	Julien Dinse	Amaury Allaire	TBA	TBA
44	"The Riddle of the Mystery Nut" "L'Énigme de la Voix Mystérieuse"	Cédric Stéphan	Rémi Zaarour	TBA	TBA
45	"The Bunny Burrow Bandit" "La Criminelle des Grands Terriers"	Patrick Imbert	Christophe Pinto	TBA	TBA
46	"Return of the Rebel Daughter" "Le Retour de la Fille Rebelle"	Alice Boucherit	Fabrice Guével	TBA	TBA
47	"The Rest of the Royal Guard" "Le Repos de La Garde Royale"	Pierre Le Gall; Thomas Mazingue	Richard Méril	TBA	TBA
48	"The Compass with No Compassion" "La Boussole de Tous les Dangers"	Pierre Le Gall; Thomas Mazingue	Anh Tu Cao	TBA	TBA
49	"The Strange Case of the Standing Stones" "L'Étrange Affaire des Pierres Debout"	Sophie Lodwitz	Amaury Allaire	TBA	TBA
50	"The Constant Quest for Kindling" "L'Incessante Quête des Brindilles"	Jordan Raux	Boris Guilloteau	TBA	TBA
51	"The Search of the Special Someone" "Le Chercheur d'Âme Sœur Âme"	Fanny Courtillot	Aude Massot	TBA	TBA
Moka thinks it's a real shame that Cherry doesn't have a special someone! As a loyal friend, he decides to play matchmaker without consulting Cherry.
52	"The Dark Paths of Amnesia" "Les Sinistres Sentiers de l'Amnésie"	Julien Dinse	Fabrice Guével	TBA	TBA
53	"Shortcut for the Abyss" "Raccourci pour les Abîmes"	Julien Dinse	Christophe Pinto	TBA	TBA
54	"The Friend from the Depths of Time" "Amie du Fond des Âges"	Julien Dinse	Richard Méril	TBA	TBA
Moka travels through time and meets a little lavender rhinoceros named Cherry... This new friend would love to become a loyal guard, so Moka tries to give her the courage and confidence she needs.
55	"The Enchanted Forest of Gunma" "La Forêt Enchantée de Gunman"	Cédric Stéphan	Anh Tu Cao	TBA	TBA
56	"The Shells of Nightmare" "Les Coquilles du Cauchemar"	Sophie Lodwitz	Aude Massot	TBA	TBA
57	"The Crushing Crown Crisis" "Crise Écrasante Couronne"	Fanny Courtillot	Christophe Pinto	TBA	TBA
Moka thinks Cherry only follows him on his adventures because he is the prince. Vexed and disappointed, he gets rid of his crown... which falls into the paws of the worst person possible: Kushka!
58	"The Race of the Relic Raiders" "Le Pilleur de Pierres Précieuses"	Estelle Yven	Richard Méril	TBA	TBA
59	"The Wrath of Richie the Conqueror" "La Colère de Richie le Conquérant"	Estelle Yven	Anh Tu Cao	TBA	TBA
60	"Pips Watermelon Prince" "Pépins Prince Pastèque"	Cédric Stéphan	Fabrice Guével	TBA	TBA
Moka swallows watermelon seeds and Cherry jokes that he'll turn into a watermelon himself. Moka takes this very seriously... and he is determined to live like a real fruit!
61	"The Untamable Tassian Devil" "L'Indomptable Diable de Tassie"	Patrick Imbert	Amaury Allaire	TBA	TBA
62	"Cherry and Moka's Epic Team" "L'Équipe Épique de Cerise et Moka"	Chloé Sastre; Romain Gadiou	Anh Tu Cao	TBA	TBA
63	"The Beast of Shadow Woods" "La Bête du Bois des Ombres"	Antoine Colomb	Lucas Pinatel	TBA	TBA
64	"The Great Duchess Hunt" "Les Chasse Gros Grande Duchesse"	Léo Bocard	Aude Massot	TBA	TBA
Moka and Cherry get caught up in a hunting owl's hunt. They must stay on their guard until dawn to escape her... But isn't Moka a bit young to be staying up all night?
65	"The Stubbornness of the Sore Loser" "L'Acharnement de la Perdante"	Chloé Sastre; Romain Gadiou	Anh Tu Cao	TBA	TBA
66	"The Cherries of Anguish" "Les Cerises de l'Angoisse"	Antoine Colomb	Amaury Allaire	TBA	TBA
Moka finds himself in an enchanted forest where he can conjure up clones of Cherry-clones that finally agree to do whatever he wants! But isn't the real Cherry worth a thousand fake-Cherries?
67	"Arja Against the Babysitting of Horror" "Arja Contre Le Babysitting de l'Horreur"	Sophie Lodwitz	Amaury Allaire	TBA	TBA
Moka is driving Cherry up the wall so she decides to get Arja to babysit to give herself an afternoon off. Unfortunately, she cannot stop worrying about the little crocodile!
68	"Escape from Xanakan" "L'Évasion des Xanakan"	Antoine Colomb	Fabrice Guével	TBA	TBA
Following a misunderstanding, Moka and Cherry find themselves in the kingdom's high-security prison! While Cherry hatches an escape plan, Moka wants to make friends with every sinister-looking convict in the joint.
69	"The Crazed Slothes and the Cursed Crown" "La Malédiction des Paresseux Parjures"	Julien Dince; Vincent Souchon	Richard Méril	TBA	TBA
Moka is worshipped by a tribe of sloths. Cherry thinks it's a bit too much... Maybe the tribe is victim of a terrible curse? It's hard for Moka to understand that it isn't normal to be adulated.
70	"The Fugitive and the Fallen Guard" "La Fugitive et la Garde Déchue"	Julien Dinse; Fanny Courtillot	Amaury Allaire	TBA	TBA
71	"Moka's Incredible Power" "L'Incroyable Pouvoir de Moka"	Pierre Le Gall; Thomas Mazingue	Lucie Tanon-Tchi Arnissolle	TBA	TBA
72	"The Tears of the Heartless Rhino" "Les Sanglots de l'Insensible Rhino"	Cédric Stéphan	Fabrice Guével	TBA	TBA
73	"The Extraordinary Meeting of Destiny" "L'Extraordinaire Recontre Notre Destin"	Sophie Lodwitz	Laury Rovelli	TBA	TBA
A little croc is born and grows up in a palace, with no friends to play with. A young rhinoceros fulfils her dream and becomes a loyal guard, but no one values her worth. This is how they met.
74	"Zita of the Fennec Tribe" "Zita de la Tribu des Fennecs"	Fanny Courtillot	Richard Méril; Louis Musso	TBA	TBA
Moka falls in love with a little fennec girl, as high on adventure as he is! He wonders how to tell her. Cherry finds it all rather cute, but with such a daredevil pair, things don't look too good.
75	"Mistress of the Sacred Bamboo" "La Maîtresse du Bambou Sacré"	Julien Dinse; Fanny Courtillot	Anh Tu Cao	TBA	TBA
76	"Kushka the First, Part 1: The Fall of King Gator" "Koushka Partie 1: La Chute Du Roi Gator"	Julien Dinse; Alice Boucherit	Fabrice Guével	TBA	TBA
Kushka returns with another evil plan: turning King Gator into... an egg! Our heroes may not be able to save the throne, but can they still save Moka's dad?
77	"Kushka the First, Part 2: The Chosen One" "Koushka Partie 2: L'Élu des Anciens"	Fanny Courtillot; Alice Boucherit	Anh Tu Cao	TBA	TBA
Moka and Cherry look for means to bring King Gator back to normal and chase Kushka out from the throne. But even a prophecy by the Ancients doesn't seem to give Moka the hope he needs. Will he be able to face his destiny?
78	"Kushka the First, Part 3: The Union of Heroes" "Koushka Partie 3: L'Union des Héros"	Antoine Colomb; Alice Boucherit	Richard Méril	2020	TBA
Cherry and Moka try to overthrow Kushka by destroying the Scepter of the Ancients, but do they have what it takes to bring down the giant lion?
