= Xilam =

French animation studio

Xilam Animation
- Type: Public
- Traded as: Euronext Paris: XIL; CAC Small
- ISIN: FR0004034072
- Industry: Animation
- Predecessor: Gaumont Multimédia
- Founded: 5 August 1999; 27 years ago
- Founders: Marc du Pontavice; Alix de Maistre
- Headquarters: Paris, France
- Area served: Worldwide
- Key people: Marc du Pontavice (CEO); Caterina Gonnelli-Liden (co-CEO); Alix de Maistre (administrator)
- Number of employees: 600 (2025)
- Subsidiaries: Xilam Vietnam; Igloo Productions GmbH; Xilam Multimédia; Xilam Studio; Xilam Studio Angoulême; Cube Creative (since 2020)
- Website: xilam.com

Xilam Animation is a French animation studio which specializes in making animated television series and feature films. Marc du Pontavice and his wife Alix de Maistre founded it in 1999 as a replacement for the animation division of Gaumont Multimédia, which was itself an offshoot of the company's television division Gaumont Télévision, a company he co-founded in 1990.

== History ==
The origin of Xilam is closely linked to Gaumont's television production activity, launched in the early 1990s. From 1990, Marc du Pontavice joined the Gaumont group to develop a television production activity and co-founded Gaumont Télévision. In 1995, he formed a video game and animation division of the company, Gaumont Multimédia. From 1994 to 1999, certain animations such as Space Goofs and Oggy and the Cockroaches met with international success for the company.

In December 1998, Pontavice left the company but would remain as a freelance executive producer for the second season of Oggy and the Cockroaches. In 1999, he went on to found Xilam and produce his own animated properties. Around this time, Gaumont was looking to exit the animation market, and in December of the same year, Gaumont sold the assets of the former Gaumont Multimédia to du Pontavice for 44 million francs and reintegrated it into Xilam. In January 2000, Xilam, in partnership with German trader Igel Media, acquired Gaumont Multimédia's 200-episode animation library.

In 2002, Xilam started trading in the Euronext Paris stock exchange.

Xilam's programs, including Shuriken School, Space Goofs, and Oggy and the Cockroaches, are internationally successful.

In 2003, the company released its first animated feature film, the CGI-based Kaena: The Prophecy. In 2005, they announced an animated film based on The New Adventures of Lucky Luke. Xilam bought the Armada animation studio in Vietnam in 2008.

In 2012, they announced Oggy and the Cockroaches: The Movie would be made. In 2015, Xilam announced the production of seasons 5-7 of Oggy and the Cockroaches using 4K and Ultra HD. A new studio was opened in Angoulême in order to repatriate production to France in addition to that of Villeurbanne.

In 2016, the studio opened a new office in Lyon, France in order to accelerate production. This new studio would produce the Paprika series, as well as the second season of Magic. In 2019, it was announced that Xilam would acquire 50.1% of French CG studio Cube Creative. The deal was finalized on 20 January 2020.

The studio almost bought the children's free-to-air TV channel Gulli in 2019, after Lagardère was about to sell its television channels in a fierce dispute between the M6 channel, which ended up buying the channel, and the company's television division in that year.

On December 1, 2025, Xilam launched Toon Box – a brand-new, kids-safe streaming app featuring over 1,000 pieces of content from across its legacy library and new series, alongside an exclusive range of videos, activities, storybooks and games. Aimed at children aged 3-10 years old, the subscription-based and ad-free app has rolled out across 11 territories (the UK, the US, Canada, France, Germany, Italy, Spain, India, Mexico, Brazil, Australia) and was initially available on iOS before also launching on Android devices in 2026. Toon Box caters to the whole family featuring some of the most iconic series from Xilam's catalogue, including Oggy and the Cockroaches, Zig & Sharko, Where's Chicky?, Mr. Magoo, The Daltons, Lupin's Tales, Paprika, and more. Episodes are available to download and watch offline, and Xilam updates the app with new content each month. To access the full Toon Box offering, new subscribers benefit from a free first month and can choose between two offers: a monthly subscription with no commitment, or an annual subscription. The group has developed this project with tightly controlled investment.

The studio's current headquarters, since 2018, are located in the former French headquarters of the comic book publisher Dupuis.

As of 2026, its board of directors includes Marc du Pontavice (CEO), Cécile Haimet (CFO), Caterina Gonnelli-Liden (co-CEO), Camille Wiplier, Safaa Benazzouz (deputy chief executive officers), Pierre Monfort (general counsel), distribution), Guillaume Jallot (CTO), Anne Hemery (EVP, human resources), Claire Darras (deputy chief operating officer) and Marie-Laurence Turpin (cultural and academic outreach director). Alix de Maistre serves as the studio's administrator, while the management of the Xilam Films division is led by Lucie Bolze.

On September 24, 2026, Armada TMT Studio (a subsidiary of Xilam Animation) announced on their Facebook page that they have renamed to Xilam Vietnam. This move aims to align the studio with its role as a production unit under Xilam Animation while reflecting its function of supporting the production process for the company's IP brands.

== Process ==
They previously used animation services in South Korea, such as Big Star Enterprise and Dong Woo Animation to animate their shows, but they stopped in the 2010s when it became too expensive and began focusing on animation services in Vietnam and the Philippines. Their recent films, I Lost My Body and Lucy Lost, had some of the animation done at Gao Shan Pictures in Réunion in the Indian Ocean. Their studio in Vietnam employs disabled artists.

On the question of their shows' theme songs, they have their own visual identity and not a montage of clips, as Marc du Pontavice always believes that the opening sequence is, in a way, the signature serving two functions for him, a call to action and playing an important role in creating lasting memories.

== Company name ==
Xilam's name is an anagram of a declaration of love from Marc du Pontavice to his wife, Alix de Maistre (M-Alix), as it has an edifying interpretation and is composed of two syllables "xi" and "lam", where the first comes from the Greek name for the letter "X", which is the symbol of transgression and the second is a reference to the soul which comes from the Latin word anima.

== Filmography ==
=== Animated series ===
| Title | Creator(s) / Developer(s) | Years | Network | Notes |
|---|---|---|---|---|
| Oggy and the Cockroaches (seasons 2–present) | Jean-Yves Raimbaud | 2000–present | France 3 (season 2); Canal+ Family (seasons 3–4); Gulli (seasons 5–8); France Télévisions (seasons 9–present) | Purchased from Gaumont co-production with Tooncan (season 2) |
| The New Adventures of Lucky Luke | Morris (original characters) | 2001–03 | France 3 Télé-Québec/Teletoon (Canada) | co-production with Dargaud Marina, Tooncan Productions and Lucky Comics |
| Cartouche: Prince of the Streets | Éric-Paul Marais | 2001–02 | M6 | co-production with Storimages |
| Ratz | Monsieur Z | 2003–04 | Teletoon (Canada); France 3 and Canal J | co-production with Tooncan Productions |
| Tupu | Pepper Sue; Elastik Jane | 2005 | France 3 and Disney Channel; ZDF (Germany); Super Écran (Canada) | co-production with Tooncan Productions |
| Space Goofs (season 2) | Jean-Yves Raimbaud; Philippe Traversat (d): Isabelle de Catalogne; Samuel Kaminka | 2005–06 | France 3 | Purchased from Gaumont |
| Shuriken School | Emilio Gallego; Jesùs Gallego (d): Pascal Morelli | 2006–07 | France 3 Jetix (Europe) | co-production with Zinkia Entertainment |
| Rintindumb | Morris (original characters) | 2006–07 | France 3 | co-production with Dargaud Marina and Lucky Comics |
| A Kind of Magic | Michel Coulon; Arthur de Pins | 2008–18 | France 3/Disney Channel (season 1); Gulli/Canal J (season 2); Primo TV (United States) (season 2) | |
| Rahan: Son of the Dark Age | Roger Lécureux; André Chéret (original characters) (d): Jean Pecheux; Pescal Morelli | 2008–09 | Canal+ Family & France 3 Rai Gulp (Italy); Kika (Germany) | co-production with Castelrosso Films, Rai Fiction and ZDF Enterprises |
| Mr. Baby | Marc du Pontavice; Carol-Ann Willering (d): Franck Ekinci | 2009–10 | France 3 | |
| The Daltons | Morris; René Goscinny (original characters) (d): Olivier Jean-Marie; Jean-François Henry | 2010–16 | France 3 | co-production with Dargaud Media, Lucky Comics and B Media Kids |
| Zig & Sharko | Olivier Jean-Marie | 2010–present | TF1/Canal+ (season 1); Gulli/M6 (seasons 2–present) | |
| FloopaLoo, Where Are You? | Marc du Pontavice (d): Fabien Limousin | 2011–14 | Canal+ Family/Teletoon+ & France 5 Rai 2/Frisbee (Italy) | co-production with Rai Fiction (season 1) and Castelrosso Films |
| What's the Big Idea? | Tanguy de Kermel | 2013 | France 5 CBeebies (United Kingdom); Senal Colombia(Colombia); Pakapaka(Argentina); JimJam(AMC Networks International)(Europe) | co-production with Planet Nemo Animation and Skyline Entertainment |
| Hubert & Takako | Hugo Gittard | 2013–15 | Gulli; Canal+ Canal J | |
| Rolling with the Ronks! | Olivier Jean-Marie; Charles Vaucelle (d): Franck Ekinci | 2016–17 | France 3 Disney Channel (International); Primo TV (United States) | |
| Paprika | Marion Billet; Baptiste Lucas | 2017–19 | France 5 Disney Jr. (International) | |
| If I Were an Animal... | Marc du Pontavice; Frédéric Fougea | 2018 | YouTube | co-production with Boréales |
| Athleticus | Nicolas Deveaux | 2018–24 | Arte | co-production with Cube Creative |
| Mr. Magoo | Millard Kaufman; John Hubley (original characters) Olivier Jean-Marie; Hugo Gittard; Olivier Delabarre; Baptiste Lucas | 2019–23 | France 4 (episodes 1–76); CITV (episodes 77–118); ITVX (episodes 77–150) | co-production with Classic Media |
| Moka's Fabulous Adventures! | Andrès Fernandez; Maxence Sani | 2020 | Gulli; Super RTL (Germany) | |
| Boon & Pimento | | 2020 | YouTube | co-production with CrossRiver Productions |
| Coach Me If You Can | Olivier Pouchelon | 2020 | France 4 Cartoon Network (Europe) | |
| Where's Chicky? (seasons 2–4) | William Hoareau | 2020–25 | Canal J | co-production with Cube Creative |
| Lupin's Tales | Nicolas Le Nevé; Laura Muller | 2021–present | France 5 Rai Yoyo (Italy); Youku (China) | Originally entitled Tiny Bad Wolf co-production with Maga Animation Studio and Rai Ragazzi |
| Chip 'n' Dale: Park Life | Bill Justice (original characters) | 2021–24 | Disney+ | co-production with Disney Branded Television |
| Oggy Oggy | Jean-Yves Raimbaud (original characters) | 2021–23 | Netflix; France 5 | |
| Tangranimals | Rémi Chapotot; Tristan Michel | 2021 | France 5 | co-production with Cube Creative |
| Pfffirates | Guillaume Herent; Benjamin Busnel; Carine Hinderchiette | 2022 | TFOU | |
| Oggy and the Cockroaches: Next Generation | Jean-Yves Raimbaud (original characters) | 2022 | Netflix | |
| The Adventures of Bernie | Olivier Jean-Marie (original characters) Alexandre Simard; Mathieu Peters-Houg; Lucille Briand | 2022 | RTS; Gulli | Spin-off of Zig & Sharko |
| Karate Sheep | Hugo Gittard | 2023 | Netflix (international); Gulli; Toggo | |
| Kaeloo (season 5) | Rémi Chapotot; Jean-François Henry; Tristan Michel | 2023 | Canal+ Kids | co-production with Cube Creative and Blue Spirit |
| Buddybot | Vincent Souchon; Joyce Colson; Florent Remize | 2024–present | Okoo | |
| Twilight of the Gods | Zack Snyder; Jay Oliva; Eric Carrasco | 2024 | Netflix | Animation services only co-production with Netflix Animation Studios and The Stone Quarry |
| Piggy Builders | Marie Manand; Julien Hazebroucq; Emmanuelle Leleu | 2025–present | France 5 CBeebies (United Kingdom); Kika (Germany) | |
| Submarine Jim | Frédéric Martin | 2026–present | France Télévisions; Toggo (Germany); CBBC (United Kingdom) | |
| The Doomies | Andrés Fernandez; Henry Gifford; Rémi Zaarour | 2026–present | Disney+ | co-production with Disney Television Animation |
| Chickies | TBA | 2027 | France Télévisions | |
| Gemma and the Defenders | TBA | TBA | TBA | |
| Phil & Sophia | TBA | TBA | TBA | |
| Empire of the Ants | Bernard Werber (original characters) | TBA | TBA | co-production with UGC |

==== Purchased from Gaumont ====
- Highlander: The Animated Series (1994–96)
- Sky Dancers (1996)
- Dragon Flyz (1996–97)
- The Magician (1997–98)

=== Film ===
==== Purchased from Gaumont ====
- Highlander: The Adventure Begins (1996; a compilation of the first few episodes of Highlander: The Animated Series)
- Dragon Flyz: The Legend Begins (1996; a compilation of the first three episodes of Dragon Flyz)

==== Original ====
| Title | Year | Distributor | Notes |
|---|---|---|---|
| Kaena: The Prophecy | 2003 | BAC Films | co-production with StudioCanal |
| Shuriken School: The Ninja's Secret | 2007 | Disney Channel | co-production with Zinkia Entertainment |
| Go West! A Lucky Luke Adventure | 2007 | Pathé Distribution (France); Alliance Vivafilm (Canada) | co-production with Dargaud Media, Lucky Comics, France 3 Cinéma, Pathé, TPS Star, Cinecinema and Mikros Image |
| Oggy and the Cockroaches: The Movie | 2013 | BAC Films | co-production with France 3 Cinéma, Canal+, France Télévisions, CNC, B Media Kids, Backup Films, A Plus Image 4, Cofinova 9, Cofimage 24, Les Films du Gorak, Cube Creative and Mikros Image |
| I Lost My Body | 2019 | Rezo Films | Xilam's first R-rated movie |
| My Life in Versailles | 2019 | Dandelooo | co-production with Films Grand Huit and Miyu Productions |
| Lucy Lost | 2026 | Le Pacte | |
| The Wolf | 2027 | ARP | co-production with Bidibul Productions |
| Untitled Jérémy Clapin film | TBA | | |
| The Migrant | TBA | | |

=== Other productions ===
==== Purchased from Gaumont ====
- Monster Men (single version of the opening song in the series Space Goofs; performed by Iggy Pop, distributed by Virgin Records)

==== Original ====
- Stupid Invaders (2000) (video game adapted of the series Space Goofs)
- Do Not Panic on Board (single version of the opening song in the series Ratz; distributed by Sony Music)
