= Oggy Oggy =

Preschool spinoff series based on Oggy and the Cockroaches

- Genre: Comedy; Preschool
- Created by: Jean Cayrol; Cédric Guarneri
- Based on: Oggy and the Cockroaches by Jean-Yves Raimbaud
- Developed by: Cédric Stéphan; Sophie Lodwitz
- Voices of: Fanny Bloc; Emmylou Homs; Kelly Marot; Kaycie Chase; Jérémy Prévost
- Music by: Vincent Artaud
- Country of origin: France
- No. of seasons: 3
- No. of episodes: 52 (156 segments) (list of episodes)

Production
- Executive producer: Marc du Pontavice
- Producer: Marc du Pontavice
- Running time: 21 minutes (6–7 minutes per segment)
- Production company: Xilam Animation

Original release
- Network: Netflix (worldwide); Okoo (France)
- Release: August 24, 2021 – October 16, 2023

Related
- Oggy and the Cockroaches; Oggy and the Cockroaches: Next Generation

Oggy Oggy is a French preschool computer-animated television series created by Jean Cayrol and Cédric Guarneri, and produced by Xilam with the participation of France Télévisions. It is a spin-off prequel to Oggy and the Cockroaches, based on the character by Jean-Yves Raimbaud and billed as the first French Netflix Original, in terms of animated series. The series follows the adventures of Oggy Oggy, a kitten version of Oggy who is free from the mayhem of the cockroaches, Joey, Dee Dee, and Marky. It was released on August 24, 2021. The series cost €20 million to make, making it Xilam's highest-budgeted series.

== Plot ==
The series follows the wild childhood of Oggy Oggy, who is Oggy when he was a kitten, freed from the mayhem of the cockroaches (because in this series, Joey, Dee Dee, and Marky don’t actually appear), who goes on heartfelt adventures with his friends (Mallow and Sporty) in a world where everything's made out of kids' toys.

== Characters ==
Unlike the original series, Oggy Oggy takes place in a town where cats happily reside (though mischievous cats can show up at times). Peculiarly enough, Jack and Olivia (who are both cats) are absent in Oggy Oggy, but are seen (with the show's 2D art style) on a framed photo in "Santa's Christmas". The cockroaches, Bob, and other characters from the original series, meanwhile, are completely absent in Oggy Oggy.

- Oggy Oggy - The titular character, he is an optimistic and fun-loving kitten. He is Oggy when he was a kitten, before he ever met the cockroaches. Oggy Oggy is the only character who communicates with sound effects of a cat, rather than being voiced. Like his Oggy and the Cockroaches counterpart, he has a light blue body, black dotted eyes, red nose, white stomach and feet.
- Mallow - Oggy Oggy's best friend. He is a kitten with yellow glasses, light green polo, black overalls, and white shoes with grey laces.
- Sporty - Oggy Oggy's other best friend. She is a kitten with white sports visor, dark green polo, white shorts and shoes with two stripes on each side.

Other characters in Oggy Oggy's hometown include:

- Grandma - Implied to be Oggy Oggy's grandma, as seen in "Eyes on the Prize". Unlike the original (where she resembled Oggy), she is a cat with a peach body, gray hair and always wears opaque glasses.
- Wild Cat - The odd one out, in tune with nature.
- Santa Paws - A cat who shows up in the series' Christmas specials, based on Santa Claus (although his stature is small, like the rest of the cats). He has Santa's red and white outfit and light yellow fur.
- The Farmer
- The Shepherd
- Flocks of sheep - Kept in small pens. They have the same cat faces as the rest of the townsfolk.
- Police Cat

== Episode list ==
=== Series overview ===
Season	Episodes	Originally released
1	16	August 24, 2021
2	13	April 17, 2023
3	23	October 16, 2023

=== Season 1 (2021) ===
No. overall	No. in season	Title	Directed by	Written by	Storyboard by	Original release date
1a	1a	"The Weather"	Frédéric Martin	Sophie Lodwitz; Cédric Stéphan	Marion Dramard	August 24, 2021
1b	1b	"The Balloon"	Sandra Derval; Frédéric Martin	Pauline Rostain	Hugues Opter	August 24, 2021
1c	1c	"The Catventurers"	Frédéric Martin	Julien Dinse	Fabrice Guevel	August 24, 2021
2a	2a	"The Plant"	Frédéric Martin	Pauline Rostain	Marion Dramard	August 24, 2021
2b	2b	"Cats and Dogs"	Frédéric Martin	Fanny Courtillot	Sandra Derval	August 24, 2021
2c	2c	"Cats in the Hat"	Frédéric Martin	Fanny Courtillot	Julien Thompson	August 24, 2021
3a	3a	"Let's Go Oggy Oggy"	Frédéric Martin	Yann Faure	Florent Poulain	August 24, 2021
3b	3b	"Thank Your Lucky Stars"	Frédéric Martin	Delphine Dubos	Bérengère Jacpuet	August 24, 2021
3c	3c	"Ship Shape"	Frédéric Martin	Cédric Lachenaud	Florent Poulian	August 24, 2021
4a	4a	"The Mysterious Wild Cat"	Frédéric Martin	Sophie Lodwitz; Cédric Stéphan	Anh-Tu Cao	August 24, 2021
4b	4b	"The New Cushion"	Frédéric Martin	Sophie Lodwitz; Cédric Stéphan	Marion Dramard	August 24, 2021
4c	4c	"Polar Cats"	Frédéric Martin	Cédric Lachenaud	Hugues Opter	August 24, 2021
5a	5a	"Sourpuss"	Sandra Derval; Frédéric Martin	Simon Lecocq	Julien Thompson	August 24, 2021
5b	5b	"Hoedown!"	Sandra Derval; Frédéric Martin	Olivier Pouchelon	Fabrice Guevel	August 24, 2021
5c	5c	"Pirate's Treasure"	Sandra Derval; Frédéric Martin	Fanny Courtillot	Julien Thompson	August 24, 2021
6a	6a	"Eyes on the Prize"	Frédéric Martin	Delphine Dubos	Hugues Opter	August 24, 2021
6b	6b	"The Fire Brigade"	Cédric Guarneri; Frédéric Martin	Sophie Lodwitz; Cédric Stéphan	Cédric Guarneri	August 24, 2021
6c	6c	"A Good Sport"	Frédéric Martin	Sophie Lodwitz; Cédric Stéphan	Hugues Opter	August 24, 2021
7a	7a	"Cookie Cutters Cat"	Frédéric Martin	Pauline Rostain	Sandra Derval	August 24, 2021
7b	7b	"Stop Thief!"	Frédéric Martin	Sophie Lodwitz; Cédric Stéphan	Marion Dramard	August 24, 2021
7c	7c	"The Sheep"	Cédric Guarneri; Frédéric Martin	Sophie Lodwitz; Cédric Stéphan	Cédric Guarneri	August 24, 2021
8a	8a	"The Missing Piece"	Frédéric Martin	Yann Faure	Julien Thompson	August 24, 2021
8b	8b	"A Jazzy Night"	Frédéric Martin	Delphine Dubos	Florent Poulain	August 24, 2021
8c	8c	"Crazy Rider"	Frédéric Martin	Sophie Lodwitz; Cédric Stéphan	Bérengère Jacpuet	August 24, 2021
9a	9a	"Nothing Like the Sun"	Sandra Derval; Frédéric Martin	Simon Lecocq	Corentin Penloup	August 24, 2021
9b	9b	"The Joggers"	Frédéric Martin	Sophie Lodwitz; Cédric Stéphan	Marion Dramard	August 24, 2021
9c	9c	"Kitty Litter"	Sandra Derval; Frédéric Martin	Branca Cepelowicz	Florent Poulain	August 24, 2021
10a	10a	"Bee in His Bonnet"	Frédéric Martin	Jawad Wachill	Laury Rovelli	August 24, 2021
10b	10b	"Student of the Year"	Frédéric Martin	Branca Cepelowicz	Fabrice Guevel	August 24, 2021
10c	10c	"The Fish"	Cédric Guarneri; Frédéric Martin	Jean Cayrol	Cédric Guarneri	August 24, 2021
11a	11a	"Band Aid"	Sandra Derval	Pauline Rostain	Corentin Penloup	August 24, 2021
11b	11b	"The Butterfly (in Your Stomach)"	Sandra Derval; Frédéric Martin	Delphine Dubos	Corentin Penloup	August 24, 2021
11c	11c	"Claw Enforcement"	Frédéric Martin	Cédric Lachenaud	Julien Thompson	August 24, 2021
12a	12a	"Apple of His Eye"	Sandra Derval; Frédéric Martin	Simon Lecocq	Hugo Delobelle; Fanny Regeste Mistral	August 24, 2021
12b	12b	"Rain-meow in the Sky"	Yani Ouabdesselam; Frédéric Martin	Marine Lachenaud; Cédric Lachenaud	Fanny Regeste Mistral	August 24, 2021
12c	12c	"Oggy Oggy Grand Prix"	Sandra Derval; Frédéric Martin	Karen Guillorel	Sylvain Girault	August 24, 2021
13a	13a	"Sloshy"	Sandra Derval	Cédric Stéphan	Guillaume Bracciali	August 24, 2021
13b	13b	"Scaredy-cat"	Yani Ouabdesselam; Frédéric Martin	Valérie Fageol	Julien Thompson	August 24, 2021
13c	13c	"The Farmer's Apprentice"	Yani Ouabdesselam; Frédéric Martin	Valérie Fageol	Corentin Penloup	August 24, 2021
14a	14a	"An Impossible Choice"	Yani Ouabdesselam; Frédéric Martin	Simon Lecocq	Julien Thompson	August 24, 2021
14b	14b	"SuperCat"	Frédéric Martin	Aude Massot	Fabrice Guevel	August 24, 2021
14c	14c	"Claws Encounters"	Frédéric Martin	Aude Massot	Hugues Opter	August 24, 2021
15a	15a	"A Trespasser in Museum"	Sandra Derval	Branca Cepelowicz	Hugues Opter	August 24, 2021
15b	15b	"Blue Angel"	Yani Ouabdesselam; Frédéric Martin	Olivier Pouchelon	Hugues Opter	August 24, 2021
15c	15c	"(Go) Cart Racing!"	Sandra Derval	Cédric Stéphan	Laury Rovelli	August 24, 2021
16a	16a	"Fixit Felines"	Yani Ouabdesselam; Frédéric Martin	Pauline Rostain	Fanny Regeste Mistral	August 24, 2021
16b	16b	"Let the Good Times Roll"	Sandra Derval; Frédéric Martin	Marine Lachenaud; Cédric Lachenaud	Hugues Opter	August 24, 2021
16c	16c	"Sea Cats"	Yani Ouabdesselam; Frédéric Martin	Vincent L'Anthoën; Clément Gournay	Guillaume Bracciali	August 24, 2021

=== Season 2 (2023) ===
No. overall	No. in season	Title	Directed by	Written by	Storyboard by	Original release date
17a	1a	"The Sled Race"	Yani Ouabdesselam	Simon Lecocq	Sylvain Girault	April 17, 2023
17b	1b	"The Shooting Star"	Frédéric Martin	Pauline Rostain	Sylvain Girault	April 17, 2023
17c	1c	"The Great Raspberryade Robbery"	Sandra Derval	Simon Lecocq	Sylvain Girault	April 17, 2023
18a	2a	"Red Card!"	Yani Ouabdesselam	Pauline Rostain	Nina Degrendel	April 17, 2023
18b	2b	"Out of Their Gourd"	Yani Ouabdesselam	Marine Piffeteau	Julien Thompson	April 17, 2023
18c	2c	"Out of Sorts, Out of Doors"	Sandra Derval	Sophie Lodwitz	Corentin Penloup	April 17, 2023
19a	3a	"Flying Sky High"	Sandra Derval	Cécile Polard	Damien Barrau	April 17, 2023
19b	3b	"The Flood"	Frédéric Martin	Augustin Mas	Fanny Regeste Mistral	April 17, 2023
19c	3c	"Ski Slope Squabble"	Sandra Derval	Léa Lespagnol	Gaël Le Gourrierec	April 17, 2023
20a	4a	"Super Mallow"	Sandra Derval	Simon Lecocq	Guillaume Bracciali	April 17, 2023
20b	4b	"Officer Oggy Oggy"	Yani Ouabdesselam	Simon Lecocq	Nina Degrendel	April 17, 2023
20c	4c	"Oggy Oggy the Farmhand"	Yani Ouabdesselam	Marine Piffeteau	Julien Thompson	April 17, 2023
21a	5a	"The Ice Cube Dilemma"	Sandra Derval	Jean-Marc Bouzigues	Fanny Regeste Mistral	April 17, 2023
21b	5b	"Out of Play"	Sandra Derval	Simon Lecocq	Sylvain Girault	April 17, 2023
21c	5c	"Forbidden Fruit"	Yani Ouabdesselam	Isabelle Bottier	Guillaume Bracciali	April 17, 2023
22a	6a	"The Puzzle Rainbow"	Sandra Derval	Marine Piffeteau	Damien Barrau	April 17, 2023
22b	6b	"The Super Signal"	Frédéric Martin	Vincent L'Anthoën; Clément Gournay	Gaël Le Gourrierec	April 17, 2023
22c	6c	"Show-stopper"	Sandra Derval	Nathan Browne	Sylvain Girault	April 17, 2023
23a	7a	"Music!"	Sandra Derval	Simon Lecocq	Fanny Regeste Mistral	April 17, 2023
23b	7b	"The Garbage Collectors"	Yani Ouabdesselam	Marine Piffeteau	Sylvain Girault	April 17, 2023
23c	7c	"Blown Away"	Frédéric Martin	Jean-Marc Bouzigues	Guillaume Bracciali	April 17, 2023
24a	8a	"Railroaded"	Frédéric Martin	Jean-Marc Bouzigues	Sylvain Girault	April 17, 2023
24b	8b	"The FireCats' Vacation!"	Sandra Derval	Augustin Mas	Julien Thompson	April 17, 2023
24c	8c	"Bad Hat Day"	Sandra Derval	Agnès Slimovici	Damien Barrau	April 17, 2023
25a	9a	"Mallow and the AstroCats"	Frédéric Martin	Cécile Polard	Guillaume Bracciali	April 17, 2023
25b	9b	"The Banjo Star!"	Frédéric Martin	Sophie Lodwitz	Manon Ollivier; Frédéric Martin	April 17, 2023
25c	9c	"Lonely Planet"	Sandra Derval	Léa Lespagnol	Julien Thompson	April 17, 2023
26a	10a	"Fix-it Fixation"	Sandra Derval	Branca Cepelowicz	Fanny Regeste Mistral	April 17, 2023
26b	10b	"Sandstorm"	Yani Ouabdesselam	Marine Piffeteau	Gaël Le Gourrierec	April 17, 2023
26c	10c	"Surprise Party"	Sandra Derval	Yoann Legave	Fanny Regeste Mistral	April 17, 2023
27a	11a	"Ice Block(Head)"	Yani Ouabdesselam	Isabelle Bottier	Nina Degrendel	April 17, 2023
27b	11b	"Fraidy Cat"	Sandra Derval	Vincent L'Anthoën; Clément Gournay	Manon Ollivier	April 17, 2023
27c	11c	"The Star Thief"	Yani Ouabdesselam	Gabrielle Serres	Damien Barrau	April 17, 2023
28a	12a	"Sticker Stickler"	Sandra Derval	Marine Piffeteau	Gaël Le Gourrierec	April 17, 2023
28b	12b	"Canned Laughter"	Yani Ouabdesselam	Bertille Rétif	Fanny Regeste Mistral	April 17, 2023
28c	12c	"Long Haul"	Sandra Derval	Fanny Courtillot	Ryan Chang Lam; Nicolas Bougard	April 17, 2023
29a	13a	"O Christmas Tree"	Sandra Derval; Frédéric Martin	Cédric Stéphan	Hugues Opter	April 17, 2023
29b	13b	"Santa Paws"	Frédéric Martin	Karen Guillorel	Marion Dramard	April 17, 2023
29c	13c	"Santa's Christmas"	Sandra Derval	Sophie Lodwitz	Guillaume Bracciali	April 17, 2023

=== Season 3 (2023) ===
No. overall	No. in season	Title	Directed by	Written by	Storyboard by	Original release date
30a	1a	"Out of the Blue"	Sandra Derval	Fanny Courtillot	Stéphane Bertaud	October 16, 2023
30b	1b	"The Picnic"	Sandra Derval	Fanny Courtillot	Corentin Penloup	October 16, 2023
30c	1c	"Sock it to 'Em"	Yani Ouabdesselam	Marine Lachenaud; Cédric Lachenaud	Guillaume Bracciali	October 16, 2023
Oggy Oggy throws Mallow a carnival's in town to games his; he is angry at Sporty and Oggy Oggy for forgetting his carnival.
31a	2a	"Bubble Cat"	Sandra Derval	Valérie Fageol	Julien Thompson	October 16, 2023
31b	2b	"Loco Motive"	Yani Ouabdesselam; Frédéric Martin	Eric Noto	Corentin Penloup	October 16, 2023
31c	2c	"Happy Birthday to Whom?"	Yani Ouabdesselam; Frédéric Martin	Vincent L'Anthoën; Clément Gournay	Julien Thompson	October 16, 2023
32a	3a	"Venus de Meow"	Sandra Derval	Simon Lecocq	Hugo Delobelle	October 16, 2023
32b	3b	"The Show Must Go On"	Yani Ouabdesselam	Jawad Wachill	Gaël Le Gourrierec	October 16, 2023
32c	3c	"Ca(s)taway"	Sandra Derval	Simon Lecocq	Guillaume Bracciali	October 16, 2023
33a	4a	"The Fair"	Yani Ouabdesselam; Frédéric Martin	Yann Faure; Yoann Legave	Julien Thompson	October 16, 2023
33b	4b	"Ice Breaker"	Sandra Derval	Simon Lecocq	Sylvain Girault	October 16, 2023
33c	4c	"The Yarn Thief"	Yani Ouabdesselam	Valérie Fageol	Fanny Regeste Mistral	October 16, 2023
34a	5a	"The Kite"	Sandra Derval	Delphine Dubos	Gaël Le Gourrierec	October 16, 2023
34b	5b	"Pilot in a Pickle"	Sandra Derval	Agnès Slimovici	Hugues Opter	October 16, 2023
34c	5c	"Dream Thief"	Yani Ouabdesselam	Fanny Courtillot	Damien Barrau	October 16, 2023
35a	6a	"Town-Cat & Tree-Cat"	Yani Ouabdesselam	Julien Dinse; Yoann Legave	Damien Barrau	October 16, 2023
35b	6b	"Catburglars"	Yani Ouabdesselam	Simon Lecocq	Guillaume Bracciali	October 16, 2023
35c	6c	"Super Oggy Oggy"	Yani Ouabdesselam	Pauline Rostain	Julien Thompson	October 16, 2023
36a	7a	"Little Cloud"	Yani Ouabdesselam	Karen Guillorel	Hugues Opter	October 16, 2023
36b	7b	"The Duel"	Yani Ouabdesselam	Simon Lecocq	Fanny Regeste Mistral	October 16, 2023
36c	7c	"Bad Cats"	Yani Ouabdesselam	Pauline Rostain	Julien Thompson	October 16, 2023
37a	8a	"Meowlloween"	Sandra Derval; Frédéric Martin	Julien Dinse	Florent Poulain	October 16, 2023
37b	8b	"Captain Fearless"	Yani Ouabdesselam	Julien Dinse; Yoann Legave	Hugues Opter	October 16, 2023
37c	8c	"Pumpkinhead"	Yani Ouabdesselam	Julien Dinse; Yoann Legave	Corentin Penloup	October 16, 2023
38a	9a	"Spooky Little Ghost"	Frédéric Martin	Anaïs Topla	Frédéric Martin; Manon Ollivier	October 16, 2023
38b	9b	"Seaside Cat-astrophe"	Sandra Derval	Vincent L'Anthoën; Clément Gournay	Guillaume Bracciali	October 16, 2023
38c	9c	"Maestro Oggy Oggy"	Yani Ouabdesselam	Louis Frélicot	Julien Thompson	October 16, 2023
39a	10a	"Up All Night!"	Sandra Derval	Agnès Slimovici	Fanny Regeste Mistral	October 16, 2023
39b	10b	"Winter Garden"	Sandra Derval	Jean-Marc Bouzigues	Hugues Opter	October 16, 2023
39c	10c	"All About Friend-Sheep"	Yani Ouabdesselam	Isabelle Bottier	Gaël Le Gourrierec	October 16, 2023
40a	11a	"Control Freak"	Sandra Derval	Simon Lecocq	Fanny Regeste Mistral	October 16, 2023
40b	11b	"An Underwater Escapade"	Sandra Derval	Fanny Courtillot	Damien Barrau	October 16, 2023
40c	11c	"The Cat That Caught the Parrot"	Frédéric Martin	Vincent L'Anthoën; Clément Gournay	Corentin Penloup	October 16, 2023
41a	12a	"The Bothersome Plant"	Frédéric Martin	Isabelle Bottier	Nina Degrendel	October 16, 2023
41b	12b	"Ghost Bluster"	Yani Ouabdesselam	Léa Lespagnol	Damien Barrau	October 16, 2023
41c	12c	"Mallow Goes Camping"	Yani Ouabdesselam	Louis Frélicot	Sylvain Girault	October 16, 2023
42a	13a	"The Starfish"	Sandra Derval	Sophie Lodwitz	Sylvain Girault	October 16, 2023
42b	13b	"Cheap Skate"	Yani Ouabdesselam; Frédéric Martin	Eric Noto	Guillaume Bracciali	October 16, 2023
42c	13c	"The Fall-Asleeper"	Yani Ouabdesselam; Frédéric Martin	Simon Lecocq	Corentin Penloup	October 16, 2023
43a	14a	"Head in the Clouds"	Sandra Derval	Marilyn Browne	Guillaume Bracciali	October 16, 2023
43b	14b	"The Maxi Golf"	Sandra Derval	Marilyn Browne	Corentin Penloup	October 16, 2023
43c	14c	"Honey, I Shrank the Cats"	Yani Ouabdesselam	Simon Lecocq	Ryan Chang Lam	October 16, 2023
44a	15a	"Disappearing Act"	Yani Ouabdesselam	Pauline Rostain	Julien Thompson	October 16, 2023
44b	15b	"Shipwrecked"	Sandra Derval	Louis Frélicot	Hugues Opter	October 16, 2023
44c	15c	"Bad Sports"	Sandra Derval	Jean-Marc Bouzigues	Guillaume Bracciali	October 16, 2023
45a	16a	"There Goes the Neighborhood"	Yani Ouabdesselam	Augustin Mas	Manon Ollivier	October 16, 2023
45b	16b	"Fired!"	Yani Ouabdesselam	Pauline Rostain; Anna Vaillant	Corentin Penloup	October 16, 2023
45c	16c	"Trickster Island"	Sandra Derval	Marine Piffeteau	Damien Barrau	October 16, 2023
46a	17a	"Sidelined"	Sandra Derval	Branca Cepelowicz	Nina Degrendel	October 16, 2023
46b	17b	"Fanning the Flames"	Sandra Derval	Marine Piffeteau	Fanny Regeste Mistral	October 16, 2023
46c	17c	"Prank-enstein"	Yani Ouabdesselam	Isabelle Bottier	Gaël Le Gourrierec	October 16, 2023
47a	18a	"Out of Sight"	Sandra Derval	Hervé Nadler	Damien Barrau	October 16, 2023
47b	18b	"Water Fight"	Yani Ouabdesselam	Anaïs Topla	Ryan Chang Lam	October 16, 2023
47c	18c	"Feeling Un-whale"	Yani Ouabdesselam	Léo Bocard	Fanny Regeste Mistral	October 16, 2023
48a	19a	"Moving Violations"	Sandra Derval	Marilyn Browne	Guillaume Bracciali	October 16, 2023
48b	19b	"Sleep Tight!"	Sandra Derval	Pauline Rostain	Frédéric Martin	October 16, 2023
48c	19c	"High Rise"	Yani Ouabdesselam	Nathan Browne	Nina Degrendel	October 16, 2023
49a	20a	"Apple Battle"	Yani Ouabdesselam	Cécile Polard	Gaël Le Gourrierec	October 16, 2023
49b	20b	"Granny Gear"	Sandra Derval	Simon Lecocq	Olivier Pouchelon	October 16, 2023
49c	20c	"Off the Bench"	Sandra Derval	Marine Piffeteau	Sylvain Girault	October 16, 2023
50a	21a	"Work to Whistle"	Yani Ouabdesselam	Marilyn Browne	Sylvain Girault; Damien Barrau	October 16, 2023
50b	21b	"CopCat Cadet"	Sandra Derval	Branca Cepelowicz; Annabelle Gervais	Hugues Opter	October 16, 2023
50c	21c	"Flying Machine"	Yani Ouabdesselam	Hervé Nadler	Guillaume Bracciali	October 16, 2023
51a	22a	"Oggy Oggy in a Pinch"	Sandra Derval	Léo Bocard	Fanny Regeste Mistral	October 16, 2023
51b	22b	"Wannabe Cowboy"	Yani Ouabdesselam	Nathan Browne	Corentin Penloup; Ryan Chang Lam	October 16, 2023
51c	22c	"Flying by the Seat of His Pants"	Yani Ouabdesselam	Ségolène Avice	Manon Ollivier	October 16, 2023
52a	23a	"The Most Wonderful Time of the Year"	Yani Ouabdesselam	Bertille Rétif	Guillaume Bracciali	October 16, 2023
52b	23b	"White Christmas"	Sandra Derval	Pauline Rostain	Nina Degrendel	October 16, 2023
52c	23c	"The Mysterious Gift"	Sandra Derval	Léa Lespagnol	Sylvain Girault	October 16, 2023

== International broadcast ==
The series globally premiered on Netflix on August 24, 2021.

On January 29, 2021, Xilam announced that France Télévisions (for France 5), Discovery Italy (for Frisbee) and Super RTL had acquired French, Italian and German TV broadcast rights to the series. The series premiered on the respective networks in 2022.

On July 6, 2022, Channel 5 acquired the UK television broadcast rights to the series for their Milkshake! strand.

In India, the show premiered on June 12, 2023, via Sony YAY!, as part of their Sony YAY! Jr. block.

== Merchandise ==
On October 25, 2021, Xilam named Simba Dickie Group as the global toy partner for the series. The toy range will consist of plush toys, figures, playsets, vehicles, and collectables.
