= Denis Sire =

French cartoonist (1953–2019)

- Born: 4 September 1953; Saint-Nazaire, France
- Died: 16 January 2019 (aged 65); Bagnolet, France
- Occupation: Cartoonist

Denis Sire (4 September 1953 – 16 January 2019) was a French cartoonist.

== Biography ==
Sire entered the École nationale supérieure des arts appliqués et des métiers d'art at age 16, where he would meet Frank Margerin. After he graduated, Sire helped publish Métal hurlant, which was run by Jean-Pierre Dionnet and Philippe Manœuvre. His first individual work was Menace diabolique in 1979. He did works in the magazine L'Echo des Savanes such as Triste jeudi.

In 1978, Sire created five different covers for Presses de la Cité, and did the same for Cheval Noir in 1992. In 1993, he created another cover for Heavy Metal. He also drew vinyl record covers for the band Taxi Girl.

In 1997, he published a comic book with Jean-Pierre Dionnet, titled L'île des amazones. In 2002, he drew stamps for the French Collection Jeunesse. Sire drew the posters for the 2005 Circuit des Remparts. In 2006, Sire made 24 paintings representing the 24 hours of the Le Mans Classic race. That same year, Nickel Productions published a collection of his works, recounting his career.

Denis Sire died on 16 January 2019.

== Works ==
- Menace diabolique (1979) ISBN 2902123736
- Bois Willys (1981) ISBN 2731600942
- 6T Mélodie (1982) ISBN 273160171X
- Kosmik Komiks (1983)
- Lisa Bay (1985) ISBN 2731603283
- Best of racing (1987)
- Ziblyne et Bettie (1992) ISBN 2731610441
- Racing (1992) ISBN 2840450054
- L'Île des amazones - Orchid Island (1997) ISBN 2226094156
- Mon continental circus à moi (2000) ISBN 290705189X
- Poupées de Sire (2001)
- Courses de légende - Indianapolis (2003) ISBN 2847870261
- Denis Sire (2006) ISBN 2914420153
- Poupées de Sire T. II (2011) ISBN 978-2-915757-25-5
- Baron d'Holbach (2012) ISBN 978-2-915757-30-9
- Baron d'Holbach 2 (2013) ISBN 978-2-915757-33-0
