= Frank Margerin =

French comics creator (born 1952)

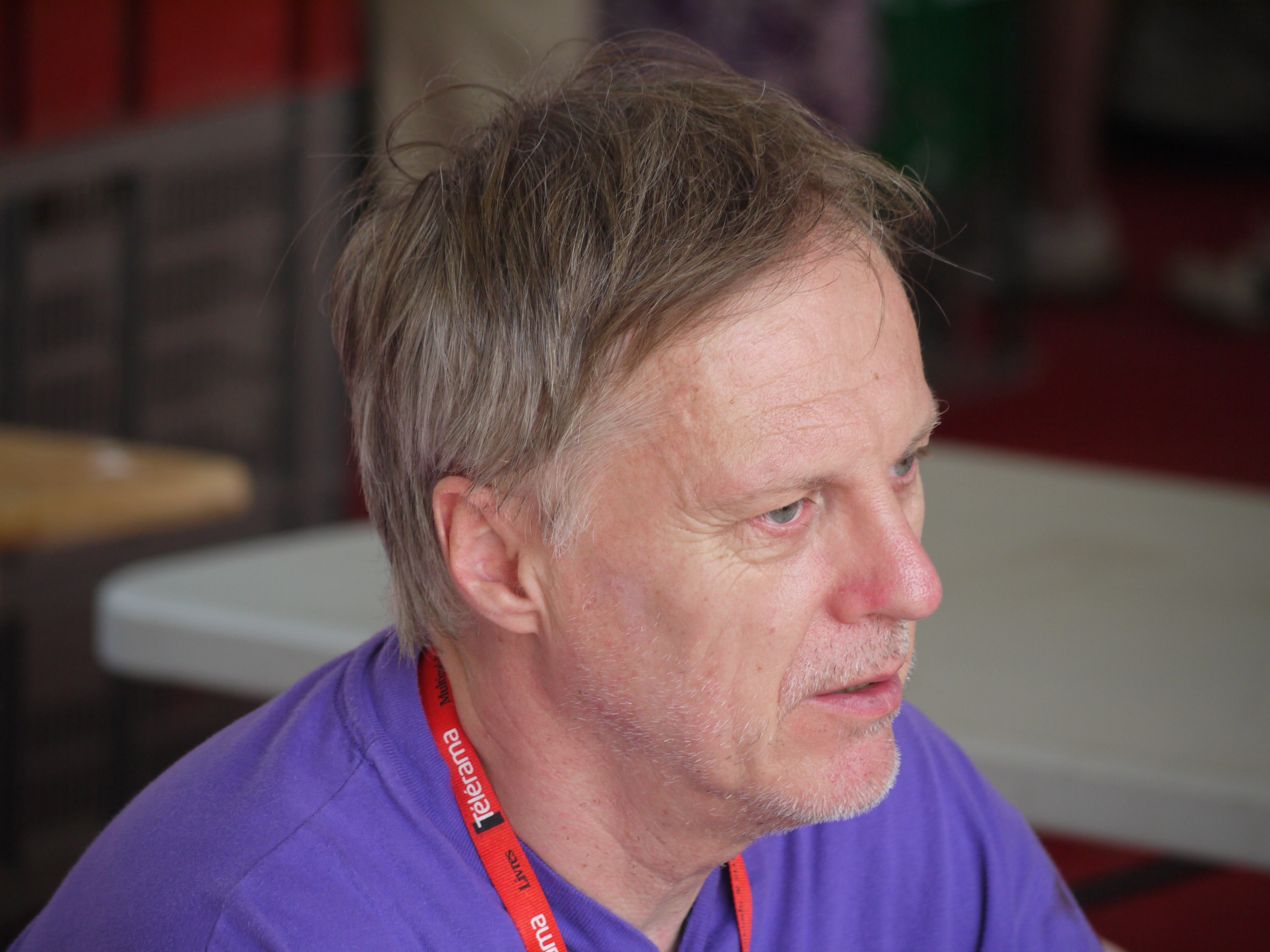
- Frank Margerin in 2009
- Born: 9 January 1952 (age 74) Paris, France
- Area: Cartoonist
- Notable works: Lucien; Frank Margerin présente...
- Awards: Grand Prix de la ville d'Angoulême, 1992

Frank Margerin (born 9 January 1952) is a French comics creator.

== Biography ==
After secondary school, Margerin went to a school of applied arts, where he met Denis Sire. He joined Sire's band, Los Crados, as a drummer. The band later became Dennis' Twist.

In 1975, while looking for work in publishing or illustrating, Margerin met Jean-Pierre Dionnet, who ordered his first comic strip, a four-page parodical science fiction story named "Simone et Léon", for the Métal Hurlant magazine. He later drew and wrote several other stories for the magazine. His first album, Frank Margerin présente..., which gathered his first works for Métal Hurlant, was published in 1978. These first stories often have elements of science fiction, to fit with the other strips of Métal Hurlant. After "Simone et Léon", he also wrote and drew several works for Rigolo, a short-lived magazine. He won his first prize in 1980 at the Lucca Comics & Games festival in Lucca.

His most famous character, Lucien, was created in 1979. Lucien is a rocker from Malakoff with a huge pompadour hairstyle that forms a cone in front of his face. Lucien first appeared as a friend of Ricky, another rocker, but he eventually became the center of the stories. With Ricky's and later Lucien's stories, Margerin comically described the life of suburban French rockers of the late 1970s and early 1980s. Bananes métalliques, one of Lucien's albums, was a commercial success in 1982 with over 100,000 books sold. His other characters included Albert and Mauricette, created in 1982, and Skoup and Max Flash, two journalists created in collaboration with Phil Casoar in 1984.

In 1989, Les Humanoïdes Associés gave him the direction of a series of collective albums with the common title Frank Margerin présente... He also created Y'a plus de jeunesse for Albin Michel and worked on an animated television series, Manu, which was first broadcast on Antenne 2 in 1990. Manu was afterwards adapted into three comic books albums, with the collaboration of Altheau.

In 1992, Margerin received the Grand Prix de la ville d'Angoulême at the Angoulême International Comics Festival. He therefore became president of the jury of the festival the next year, which was the twentieth edition of the festival.

== Bibliography ==
- Lucien (Les Humanoïdes Associés) :
  - 1981 - Tome 1. Votez Rocky, ISBN 2-7316-0125-6
  - 1982 - Tome 2. Bananes Métalliques, ISBN 2-7316-1317-3
  - 1982 - Tome 3. Radio Lucien, ISBN 2-7316-1318-1
  - 1985 - Tome 4. Chez Lucien, ISBN 2-7316-1319-X
  - 1989 - Tome 5. Lucien se met au vert, ISBN 2-7316-0728-9
  - 1987 - Tome 6. Lulu s’maque, ISBN 2-7316-0438-7
  - 1998 - Tome 7. Ricky chez les Ricains, ISBN 2-7316-1271-1
  - 2000 - Tome 8. Week-end motard, ISBN 2-7316-1391-2
  - Lucien, Le retour ISBN 2-7316-1125-1
  - Lucien, 25 piges ISBN 2-7316-1607-5
- 1983 - Kosmik Komiks (Kosmik) : collective album
- Ricky
  - 1984 Ricky VII, ISBN 2-277-33140-6
  - 1987 Ricky Banlieue, ISBN 2-7316-0367-4
- 1985 - Un Enfoiré et quelques connards, followed with Un gnon et quelques bosses (Crapule and Le Seuil)
- 1986 - La Bande à Renaud (Delcourt) : collective
- 1986 - Félix et le bus (UTP) : illustrator
- 1989 - Y’a plus de jeunesse (Éditions Albin Michel) ISBN 2-226-03575-3
- Manu (Les Humanoïdes Associés) :
  - 1990 - Tome 1. L’Insupportable Manu, ISBN 2-7316-0772-6
  - 1991 - Tome 2. L’Abominable Manu, ISBN 2-7316-1011-5
  - 1994 - Tome 3. Le Danger public, ISBN 2-7316-1040-9
- 1992 - Le Guide du surf (La Sirène) : illustrator
- Frank Margerin Présente (Les Humanoïdes Associés) :
  - 1998 - Tome 1. Alerte aux Envahisseurs, ISBN 2-7316-1313-0
  - 1998 - Tome 2. Tranches de Brie, ISBN 2-7316-0368-2
  - 1998 - Tome 3. Tutti Frutti, ISBN 2-7316-1315-7
  - 1998 - Tome 4. Tirage de tête
  - Tome 1 - La fête, ISBN 2-7316-0701-7
  - Tome 2 - La télé, ISBN 2-7316-0725-4
  - Tome 3 - Toutous et matous, ISBN 2-7316-0759-9
  - Tome 4 - Frank Margerin, ISBN 2-7316-0759-9
  - 2006 - Shirley et Dino, ISBN 2-7316-1882-5
- 2001 - Paroles de taule (Delcourt) : collective, ISBN 2-84055-782-7
- Momo le coursier (Éditions Albin Michel)
  - 2002 Tome 1 : ISBN 2-226-13229-5
  - 2003 Tome 2 : Momo roule toujours, ISBN 2-226-14787-X
  - 2005 Tome 3 : Le grand saut, ISBN 2-226-16673-4
