= Manu (TV series) =

Manu is a French animated series, based on comic books by cartoonist Frank Margerin. It premiered in 1991 and was about a teenager 'Manu' and situations in his own life, with the rest of his family and his friend Robert. It used to air in the United Kingdom (Dubbed into English) on the now defunct Children's Channel between 1992 and the channel's closure in 1998.

It was produced by the French animation studio "Jingle", and the French and defunct network La Cinq.
