= Mr. Baby =

French adult animated sitcom

- Genre: Comedy; Crude comedy
- Created by: Marc du Pontavice; Carol-Ann Willering
- Developed by: Franck Ekinci
- Directed by: Hugo Gittard
- Voices of: French: Féodor Atkine; Patrick Mancini; Marie-Laure Dougnac; Donald Reignoux; Alice Amiel; Brigitte Virtudes; English: Seán Barrett; Daniel Flynn; Emma Tate; Amber Beattie; Chris Nelson
- Composers: Thomas & Grégoire Couzinier
- Country of origin: France
- Original languages: French; English
- No. of seasons: 1
- No. of episodes: 48

Production
- Executive producers: Marc du Pontavice; Katell Lardeux
- Producer: Marc du Pontavice
- Editor: Patrick Ducruet
- Running time: 4 minutes
- Production company: Xilam

Original release
- Network: France 3
- Release: 3 May 2009 – 10 August 2010

Mr. Baby (also known as A Week with Mr. Baby) (French: Monsieur Bébé) is a French adult animated 4-minute television series, that lasted 48 episodes, created by Marc du Pontavice and Carol-Ann Willering, produced at Xilam, directed by Hugo Gittard and broadcast from 3 May 2009 to 10 August 2010 on France 3 on the Toowam programming block, and France 4 on the Ludo programming block. The show is animated by utilizing Toon Boom animation. In the United Kingdom, the series originally aired on BBC One from 2009 to 2012, and later aired on Comedy Central from 2012 to 2014. The series has yet to air on television in Canada and the United States.

The show is known for its art style reminiscent of UPA cartoons, as well as Cartoon Network's Samurai Jack.

== Synopsis ==
The series focuses on the everyday life of Mr. Baby, who thinks and even talks like a grown-up, but also has an incredibly, severely sharp tongue. He also has an older brother, Rudy, a skater-like rebel, and an older sister, Claire, who is a teenager.

== Production ==
Marc du Pontavice created the show after seeing a picture somewhere of a baby sitting in a chair reading the newspaper. He and Xilam created the series with Hugo Gittard, in which du Pontavice participated in almost every stage. Du Pontavice loved this collaboration with him because Gittard never ceased to surprise Pontavice, managing to make each episode unique, even though the series takes place in a kitchen with the same characters. With the show, Hugo Gittard definitely proved his talent as a director at Xilam.

== Translations ==
Originally from France on the publicly funded channel France 3, Monsieur Bébé was translated into English as Mr. Baby.

== Voice cast ==
=== French ===
- Féodor Atkine - Monsieur Bébé
- Patrick Mancini - Patrick
- Marie-Laure Dougnac - Carole
- Alice Amiel - Clarisse
- Donald Reignoux - Ludo

=== English ===
- Seán Barrett - Mr. Baby
- Daniel Flynn - Patrick
- Emma Tate - Carole
- Amber Beattie - Claire
- Chris Nelson - Rudy
