= DeA Kids =

Italian television channel

- Country: Italy

Programming
- Language: Italian

Ownership
- Owner: De Agostini
- Sister channels: DeA Junior; Super!

History
- Launched: October 1, 2008

Links
- Website: Official website

DeA Kids, stylized as D^{e}Akids until 2008; is an Italian children's television channel owned by De Agostini. The channel was launched on October 1, 2008, on Sky Italia for children aged 4–14. A month later, a timeshift version of the channel, Dea Kids +1, was launched on November 10, 2008.

== History ==
It began broadcasting on October 1, 2008, on a satellite frequency encrypted with VideoGuard, available exclusively on a subscription basis on the Sky platform (channel 601).

The timeshift version, DeA Kids +1, has been available on Sky channel 602 since November 10, 2008.

From November 29, 2012, the channel became available on Sky Go and Now.

On April 1, 2016, the channel switched to the 16:9 widescreen format.

Voice actor Jacopo Calatroni has served as the channel's official announcer since 2016.

On September 5, 2022, DeA Kids updated its network logo and graphics.

Since December 1, 2023, the channel has been available in high definition on the NOW streaming platform and on Sky Stream and Sky Glass decoders, while remaining in SD on satellite.

On December 1, 2025, DeA Kids +1 permanently ceases broadcasting due to the arrival of Disney Jr..

== Current programming ==
- Bread Barbershop
- Camilla Store
- Camilla Store Best Friends
- Find Me in Paris
- Kally's Mashup
- La Famiglia Gionni
- Music Distraction
- New School
- Oggy and the Cockroaches
- Pippi Longstocking
- Street of Magic
- Talent High School
- Ted's Top Ten
- Total Drama
- Total DramaRama
- Zig & Sharko

== Former programming ==
- All Hail King Julien
- Animalia
- Atchoo!
- Big and Small
- Boy Girl Dog Cat Mouse Cheese
- Cosmic Quantum Ray
- Creamy Mami, the Magic Angel
- Cyberchase
- Dinosaur Train
- Gaby Star
- Gakuen Alice
- Garfield and Friends
- Geronimo Stilton
- Heidi, Girl of the Alps
- Jamie's Got Tentacles!
- Justice League
- Justice League Unlimited
- Kaeloo
- Kamichama Karin
- La Seine no Hoshi
- LoliRock
- Magical DoReMi
- Maya the Honey Bee
- Mr. Magoo
- Moka's Fabulous Adventures!
- Popples
- Project Puppy
- Robin Hood: Mischief in Sherwood
- Ronaldinho Gaucho's Team
- Strawberry Shortcake's Berry Bitty Adventures
- Sugarbunnies
- Sugarbunnies Chocolat!
- The Adventures of Puss in Boots
- The Amazing Spiez!
- The Daltons
- The New Adventures of Peter Pan
- Time Warp Trio
- Teletubbies (original series)
- Tokyo Mew Mew
- Turbo Fast
- Viky TV
- Viky TV - How To
- Wagner a Modo Mio
- Waybuloo
- Where on Earth Is Carmen Sandiego?
- Winx Club
- WordGirl
- X-Men: Evolution
- Z-Squad
