= Ronaldinho Gaucho's Team =

2011 Italian animated television series

- Also known as: Ronaldinho Gaucho's Team
- Countries of origin: Italy; Brazil
- Original languages: Italian; Portuguese
- No. of seasons: 1
- No. of episodes: 52

Production
- Executive producer: Giuliano Giovanni
- Running time: 11 minutes
- Production companies: GIG Italy Entertainment; MSP - Mauricio de Sousa Produções

Original release
- Network: DeA Kids (Italy); Nickelodeon, Disney XD (UK); TV ANAK Spacetoon (Indonesia); Cartoon Network, Gloob (Brazil); Cartoon Network (South Korea); Hod Hod Farsi (Iran); JeemTV (Qatar); Bio, ABC3, KidsCo (Australia); Teletoon (Canada); Puls 2 (Poland)
- Release: October 15, 2011

Ronaldinho Gaucho's Team is an Italian animated series for television based on the Brazilian soccer star Ronaldinho Gaúcho. The pilot episode was first broadcast on October 15, 2011, on the DeA Kids channel.

Ronaldinho Gaucho's Team is the first animated series for TV produced by the Italian studio GIG Italy Entertainment, with the co-production of MSP - Mauricio de Sousa Produções, which publishes in Brazil the Ronaldinho Gaucho comic strip based on the fictionalised version of Ronaldinho as a child. The stories are based on the animated adventures of the character in comics, with 52 episodes of 11 minutes each.

== Cast ==
- Mark Hanna: Diego
- Katie McGovern: Daisy
- George Todria: Assis
