= Oggy and the Cockroaches: The Movie =

- English release poster
- Directed by: Olivier Jean-Marie
- Written by: Olivier Jean-Marie
- Based on: Oggy and the Cockroaches by Jean-Yves Raimbaud
- Produced by: Marc du Pontavice
- Edited by: Patrick Ducruet
- Music by: Vincent Artaud
- Production companies: Xilam Animation; France 3 Cinéma; Canal+ France Télévisions; CNC; B Media Kids; Backup Films; A Plus Image 4 Cofinova 9 Cofimage 24; Les Films du Gorak; Cube Creative; Mikros Image
- Distributed by: BAC Films
- Release dates: 10 June 2013 (Annecy); 7 August 2013 (France)
- Running time: 81 minutes
- Country: France
- Language: English
- Budget: €5 million
- Box office: $985,463

Oggy and the Cockroaches: The Movie (French: Oggy et les Cafards: Le Film) is a 2013 French animated anthology comedy film directed and written by Olivier Jean-Marie, that premiered in France on August 7, 2013. The film is based on the Tex Avery-inspired television series of the same name, created by Jean-Yves Raimbaud.

The film revolves around the adventures of Oggy, a light blue cat who dreams of a perfect existence, but has to deal with three trouble-making cockroaches who make his life miserable throughout four timelines, composed of self-contained stories in a chronological order. These stories also feature Jack, Bob and Olivia. The basis of the movie also became the theme of the fifth season of Oggy and the Cockroaches (premiering four years later in 2017), which also took place in a variety of countries throughout history, like Ancient Egypt and China, within three, separately self-contained episodes.

== Plot ==
A clip from the segment, "Oggy-Wan Kenoggy". Oggy parodies the character Obi-Wan Kenobi, while Bob plays the role of Darth Vader.

Within opening text vaguely stating an "extremely long time ago", a blue amoeba forms in the sea of a mysterious, unevolved planet. This amoeba’s appearance gets made fun of by three other amoeba, a purple one, an orange one, and a green one. Distraught, The blue amoeba chases after the pesky trio. These amoebae then slowly evolve into a light blue cat named Oggy and a trio of cockroaches, Dee Dee, Joey, and Marky respectively, to which Oggy ends up having to chase after them on a desert island.

In 120 Kya, the cats evolved into neanderthals, and live in villages. Oggy and his cousin, Jack, have to obtain fire for the tribe's chief, after Oggy accidentally snuffs out the fire trying to catch the roaches. However, it is revealed Oggy dislikes the idea, due to him having a fear of fire because of a bad childhood memory. They however, are made to comply. Oggy and Jack hike to the volcano, with the roaches causing problems for them. After scaling the volcano, Oggy descends into the volcano, and finds that the inside is lush. Oggy passes out, and is then captured by a group of hyenas. The hyenas take Oggy to their leader Bob, a bulldog, who decides to eat him. But, Oggy is saved by Olivia, a white cat, who nurses him. Oggy bonds with Olivia, while Jack descends and meets her. The roaches lead Bob and his group to the trio, and Jack and Olivia are captured. Oggy makes a torch and saves the two, and trio are able to escape Bob. Upon arriving at the village, give to fire to the chief and the day is saved.

In the medieval story "Prince Oggy II", Oggy and Jack work together to try and succeed at quests from Oggy's father, a noble figure and king, who also defeated the detested cockroach king. The two also discover forest-dwelling Olivia, who was to be assigned a princess, but later is kidnapped and held captive in a castle by the roaches.

In "The Incredible Jack Holmes & Oggy Watson", based on Sir Arthur Conan Doyle's Sherlock Holmes stories, Dee Dee and Marky, who are working for Joey, steal Olivia's key to Big Ben. She thus asks the detective Jack Holmes for help, with Oggy helping out on their adventure as much as he can. With London's year coming to an end, hijinx ensues.

In the CGI story "Oggy-Wan Kenoggy", parodying Star Wars and the film Star Wars: A New Hope, Oggy-Wan Kenoggy (with the help of Jack) traverses through space itself to hijack a ship. Tasked to stop Bob Vader from trying to destroy the world, he readies himself with his lightsaber. However, Bob has another idea; he sends out his troops, the three cockroaches. It doesn't go as they might expect. Oggy and the cockroaches almost fell into the cannon. Bob tries to destroy them, however, Joey gives Bob a sad face, reminding the two of them about their lives together as babies. But Bob doesn’t fall for it, and instead turns on the laser. He tires to destroy the unnamed green planet, but Jack stops it. After the fourth timeline ends with a large explosion, Bob cries in frustration at the sight of his now-destroyed ship, and the characters (with the ccoockkroaches's limbs detached) end up falling into a vast ocean. As the animation style returns to 2D animation, the cat’s limbs fell in the ocean and slowly morphs into a blue amoeba. The amoeba is once again made fun of by three other amoeba. And for one more time, the four amoebae evolve into Oggy and the cockroaches, and the former ends up chasing after the latter trio on the same desert island from the opening scene once more.

== Characters ==
Some of the characters' voices from the fourth season's episodes ("From Mumbai with Love" and "Oggy Is Getting Married!") were provided from audio recorded by Hugues Le Bars, who composed for the original series. Each timeline assigns them a different role. One of these characters, Olivia, only appears in three timelines.

- Oggy - The main protagonist of the film's segments. He is light-hearted, and is easily annoyed by the roaches.
- The cockroaches - The main antagonists of the first three segments, except "Oggy-Wan Kenoggy".
  - Joey - The leader, who doesn't plan anything, only in "Jack Holmes". He is the smallest cockroach with a purple-pink body, a pink right eye, a yellow left eye, and a lavender head. Even though he is the shortest roach in the group, he is the most intelligent, always being the brain for their plans.
  - Marky - Mainly assists Joey. He is the tallest cockroach with a silver body, a light green head, pink eyes and long, thin, curly antennae.
  - Dee Dee - The medium-sized and youngest cockroach with a fat dark blue body, a large orange head and light green eyes. He is the glutton, more focused on food than fiendish plans.
- Jack - Oggy's cousin, a cat with an olive green body, yellow eyes, red nose, pale pink stomach, and white feet, who often aids him throughout the adventure. In contrast to Oggy, he is more short-tempered, violent, and arrogant than him.
- Bob - A minor antagonist in "Oggy Magnon" and "Prince Oggy II", a minor character in "Jack Holmes", and the main antagonist in "Oggy-Wan Kenoggy".
- Olivia - A kind-hearted cat, who is an aiding protagonist in "Oggy Magnon", "Prince Oggy II", and "Jack Holmes".

== Soundtrack ==
The soundtrack of the film was released on August 5, 2013, composed by Vincent Artaud, who is a composer on other Xilam titles like Zig & Sharko's second through fourth seasons and the opening sequence of Hubert & Takako. The Paris Symphonic Orchestra helped bring the score to life, with the opening theme from Hugues Le Bars rearranged and extended by Artaud.

2013: Oggy et les Cafards : le film (Sony Music Entertainment)
No.	Title	Length
1.	"Générique"	0:51
2.	"La Vie au Village"	1:50
3.	"Poursuite Néolithique"	0:19
4.	"Voyage de Cro-Magnon"	2:19
5.	"Le Voyage de Jack"	2:48
6.	"Les Pirhanas"	1:20
7.	"Les Méchants Chiens"	1:25
8.	"Oggy et Olivia"	2:17
9.	"Oggy Passe à l'Action"	2:19
10.	"La Danse des Chiens"	3:25
11.	"Oggy et Jack Vont à la Chasse"	1:58
12.	"La Statue Du Roi"	0:57
13.	"Le Défilé"	1:15
14.	"La Romance d'Oggy"	1:54
15.	"Les Cafards Montent un Plan"	1:10
16.	"Oggy et Jack Galopent"	1:17
17.	"L'Évasion"	0:36
18.	"Thème d'Olivia"	1:12
19.	"31 Décembre 1899"	1:16
20.	"Chez Sherlock"	1:04
21.	"Les Cafards Volent la Clé puis la Bombe"	1:45
22.	"Enquête dans la Boutique"	1:14
23.	"Carnaby Street"	1:14
24.	"L'Hélicoptère"	1:22
25.	"Poursuite Aérienne"	2:24
26.	"Big Ben"	1:22
27.	"La Fête de Fin d'Année"	1:42
28.	"Oggy-Wan"	2:30

== Release and distribution ==
The film was released in France on August 7, 2013. In the United Kingdom and Ireland, it was released on May 20, 2014. In India, it was released on December 21, 2014, and on Cartoon Network, it was also released on Sony YAY! on October 25, 2021.

The film had 142,232 viewers in France, far from the goal of the film's director, Olivier Jean-Marie, who had hoped for at least 500,000 viewers in French cinemas.

Oggy and the Cockroaches: The Movie was released on DVD and Blu-ray on December 7, 2013. The film was officially released onto YouTube, free to watch, on November 11, 2019. The Blu-ray release also features some exclusive scenes involving Napoleonic and Roman Empire eras that were deleted from the final film (though small glimpses of the scenes are present in the trailer).
