= Super! =

Italian television channel

- Country: Italy
- Broadcast area: Italy; Switzerland
- Headquarters: Milan

Programming
- Language: Italian/original (satellite only)
- Picture format: 1080i (HDTV)

Ownership
- Owner: De Agostini Communications (De Agostini)
- Sister channels: DeA Kids

History
- Launched: 1 September 2010; 16 years ago
- Former names: DeA Super (2010–2012)

Links
- Website: www.supertv.it

Availability

Terrestrial
- Digital: Channel 47

Super! is an Italian free-to-air television channel owned by De Agostini subdiairy De Agostini Communications. The channel was launched as a pay TV kids' channel on 1 September 2010 as DeA Super on Sky Italia targeted towards children aged 8 to 12. On 18 March 2012, it became free-to-air and had a major rebranding, changing both its graphics and its name to Super!. The network's official speaker has been voice actor Renato Novara since 2010.

On 15 September 2017, Viacom (now Skydance Corporation) acquired 50% of the channel. On October 18, 2019, Viacom took full ownership of Super!. However, the collaboration with De Agostini continued with a multi-year agreement for original content. De Agostini reacquired the full ownership of Super! from Paramount on July 17, 2026.

== Programming ==
Super! was the first Italian television channel to air a Korean drama, Dream High, from 1 September to 16 October 2013, the only K-drama broadcast in Italy. However, the series was heavily edited, with Korean names being changed to English alternatives (for example, Hye-mi became Sam, Sam-dong became Brian, and Jin-guk became Dylan), episodes being split into two half-hour ones, some scenes cut to reduce the length of the episodes or to censor the content unsuitable for young audiences, mainly blood. An unedited version, featuring the same voice actors of the TV dub, was posted on the K-drama's official Italian YouTube channel from 30 October 2013 to 10 January 2014.

During October 2019, a new programming block premiered, Chicchirichì Time, which was aimed at preschoolers, airing series like Shimmer and Shine and Bubble Guppies. The block was later discontinued.

In April 2026, Italian media outlets, including the financial newspaper ItaliaOggi, reported that Paramount Skydance was planning to shut down the Super! network during the summer, this was attributed to a major corporate restructuring of the Italian branch, which included severe staff cuts and the relocation of management operations to London. According to these early reports, Paramount intended to discontinue the linear channel and sell its LCN 47 broadcasting frequencies.

In July 2026, De Agostini Editore reacquired full ownership of the channel from Paramount Skydance, preventing its closure and securing its continued broadcasting on LCN 47.

== Logo ==
2015–2021; 2026–present

2021–2025

2025–2026
