= Hugues Le Bars =

French composer (1950–2014)

Hugues Le Bars (13 October 1950 – 1 November 2014) was a French film music composer.

== Filmography ==
- Oggy and the Cockroaches - Composer, voice actor (seasons 1–4)
- Oggy and the Cockroaches: The Movie - Voice actor (and reused audio)
- The New Adventures of Lucky Luke - Composer

His voice clips were also frequently reused, mostly for whenever the cockroaches laughed, in Oggy and the Cockroaches: Next Generation.

== Discography ==
- 1981: Est-ce le mec
- 1989: 1789... ET NOUS (ballet music of Maurice Béjart)
- 1991: J'en ai marre
- 1995: Zinzin
- 1997: Oggy et les Cafards
- 2001: Musique pour Versailles
- 2010: Massay Massey
- 2013: Ettoo
