= Mr. Magoo (TV series) =

2019 French television series

- Created by: Olivier Jean-Marie; Hugo Gittard; Olivier Delabarre; Baptiste Lucas
- Based on: Mr. Magoo by Millard Kaufman; John Hubley
- Directed by: Hugo Gittard; Fabien Limousin (episodes 19–150, except for 56, 57, and 59–61); Christophe Pinto (season 2); Eric Bastier (season 2)
- Voices of: Ian Hanlin; Colin Murdock; Shawn MacDonald
- Theme music composer: Vincent Artaud
- Composer: Vincent Artaud
- Country of origin: France
- Original languages: French; English
- No. of seasons: 2
- No. of episodes: 150

Production
- Executive producers: Marc du Pontavice; Eric Ellenbogen; Doug Schwalbe
- Producer: Marc du Pontavice
- Editor: Lou Bouniol
- Running time: 7 minutes 21 minutes ("Fizz: Origins", "Mr. Cat, Secret Agent" and "Magoo Junior")
- Production company: Xilam Animation

Original release
- Network: France 4 (episodes 1–76); CITV (episodes 77–118); ITVX (episodes 77–150)
- Release: May 4, 2019 – February 13, 2023

Related
- What's New, Mr. Magoo? (1977)

Mr. Magoo is a French animated series produced by Xilam with the participation of France Télévisions and Classic Media. It premiered in Portugal on December 17, 2018, and on Boomerang Africa HD on July 3, 2019. The series was renewed for a second season on September 23, 2021. It premiered in the United Kingdom on CITV on April 8, 2019, and the streaming service ITVX on December 10, 2022. In an effort to revive the character, DreamWorks, which holds the rights to Mr. Magoo, approached Xilam to create a new animated series featuring the character. The series was Olivier Jean-Marie's final production before his death on May 13, 2021.

== Plot ==
Mr. Magoo follows the eponymous kind-hearted fellow who is always happy to lend a hand—but often causes disasters instead, as without his glasses he makes all kinds of chaotic mix-ups. Despite this, his only enemy is Fizz, a megalomaniacal hamster who is somehow always accidentally thwarted by Magoo, along with his pet dog Mr. Cat.

== Characters ==
- Mr. Magoo (voiced by Ian Hanlin) is a happy-go-lucky elderly man without glasses. Due to his poor vision, he does not know what he is doing. However, he is cheerful and likes to help out, even if he often does more harm than good due to his poor eyesight. The character was originally going to be voiced by Billy West, but DreamWorks and Xilam decided they didn't want the existing version of Magoo and wanted to update the character, resulting in West being replaced by Ian Hanlin.
- Mr. Cat (voiced by Colin Murdock) is Mr. Magoo's pet Bull Terrier. While he is annoyed by his owner's poor vision, he cares deeply about Magoo and rescues him whenever he gets in grave danger. He is also aware of what Fizz's intentions are and that Weasel works for Fizz. He acts as a replacement or counterpart to Magoo's original dog, McBarker.
- Fizz (also voiced by Colin Murdock) is an anthropomorphic evil, megalomaniacal orange hamster who wants to take over the world and be worshipped forever, but his plans are, one way or another, ruined by Mr. Magoo (unbeknownst to his antagonistic intentions). Thus, he has a hatred for Magoo and wants to kill him, but always ends up failing. A running gag is that he ends up screaming "MAAAAAAAAAAAAGOOOOOOOOOOOOOO!" at the end of every episode.
- Weasel (voiced by Shawn MacDonald), Fizz's dim-witted yet loyal human henchman. Mr. Magoo sometimes recognizes him, but usually mistakes him for animals or different people. Mr. Cat, who knows he works for Fizz, resents him. A running gag is that Mr. Cat attacks him, often biting his legs.
- Linda (voiced by Mariee Devereux), one of Magoo's long-suffering neighbours.
- Mr. President, a Barack Obama-like figure that rules the country Mr. Magoo lives in.
- Marnie (voiced by Jennifer Cameron) is the love interest of Magoo, who first appears in "Hats Off Magoo!".

== Episodes ==
=== Series overview ===
Season	Episodes	Originally released	
Season	Episodes	First released	Last released
1	78	May 4, 2019	October 8, 2020
2	72	December 10, 2022	February 13, 2023

=== Season 1 (2019–20) ===
No.	Title	Written by	Storyboarded by	Original release date	Prod. code
1	"They Are Among US"	Hugo Gittard	Cédric Dietsch	May 4, 2019	101
Magoo, wandering at the home of Fizz's, a hamster who is desperate to take over the world and his assistant, Weasel, thinks that he is boarded on an UFO.
2	"Pinkbeard's Treasure"	Fabien Limousin; Cédric Stephan	Louis Musso; Cédric Dietsch	May 11, 2019	
Magoo, wandering at the park going after Fizz's box of delicious, never-dropping ice cream, thinks that he is at a pirate island to find Captain Pinkbeard's treasure.
3	"A Mountaineer Like No Other"	Solenn Le Priol; Giulia Volli	Louis Musso; Cédric Dietsch	May 18, 2019	
Magoo, climbing on a skyscraper, thinks that he is climbing on a mountain. When he encounters Fizz, who uses Weasel for a damsel in distress in order to be recognised as a superhero, thinks that he is a wounded baby bird that has fallen from his nest, waiting for his mother.
4	"Wallpapering Magoo"	Nicolas Le Nevé	Louis Musso	May 22, 2019	107
Magoo agrees to help his neighbour, Linda, redecorate her room, but actually, he destroys Fizz's hypnotic posters, that hypnotizes the person who stares at it that listen to his commands, which the victim is Mr. Cat, who obeys Fizz and Weasel to compete with him.
5	"Lend Me Your Earpiece"	Fabien Limousin; Cédric Stephan	Louis Musso; Cédric Dietsch	May 29, 2019	106
Magoo gets shrunk along with Fizz, who he thinks that he is a little boy lost in the cinema and gets in the President's head in order for Fizz to mind-control him by complimenting him in his speech.
6	"Honey Bear"	Solenn Le Priol; Giulia Volli	Louis Musso; Cédric Dietsch	June 5, 2019	
Magoo, at the park, which he thinks that he is at the camping site, encounters Weasel, who works with Fizz to collect honey to add his chemical to make beautiful hair gel, and thinks that it is a wounded bear.
7	"Halloween Hold-up"	Nicolas Le Nevé	Louis Musso; Cédric Dietsch	June 12, 2019	112
Fizz plans a stage robbery in which he uses actor robber, Weasel to be stopped by him to be recognised as a heroic force of good. But the plan was ruined by Magoo, who unwittingly robs the bank, thinks he is receiving candy in his sack during trick-or-treating.
8	"Firefighter for a Day"	Nicolas Le Nevé	Cédric Dietsch	June 19, 2019	
Mr Magoo is a part-time firefighter reservist whose rescue mission for the day is to save a cat in a tree - in reality, the cat is none other than Fizz!
9	"Legs of Steel"	Nicolas Le Nevé	Louis Musso; Cédric Dietsch	June 26, 2019	109
Thinking that he is in the middle of a workout at his local gym, Mr Magoo inadvertently climbs onto a delivery boy's bicycle.
10	"Hats Off Magoo!"	Hugo Gittard	Wandrille Maunoury	July 3, 2019	
Magoo thinks that Fizz is a hat that he is going to wear for a romantic date with Marnie - that's bad enough, but Fizz has a very important job to do... Note: This is the first appearance of Marnie, Magoo's love interest.
11	"Mistaken Identity"	Maité Sonnet	Louis Musso; Cédric Dietsch; Richard Méril	July 10, 2019	
While at the supermarket, Mr Magoo mixes his shopping cart up with a baby stroller - Fizz decides to save the toddler, only to become a media star.
12	"A Recipe for Success"	Fabien Limousin; Cédric Stephan	Louis Musso; Cédric Dietsch	July 17, 2019	110
Mr Magoo thinks that Weasel has opened a restaurant and wants to help him improve it, but he mistakes the FizzLab for a kitchen...
13	"Skyfall"	Fabien Limousin; Cédric Stephan	Cédric Dietsch	July 24, 2019	102
When Mr Magoo treats Mr Cat to a parachute jump, the two friends land on the top of the AeroFizz and Mr Magoo mistakes it for a desert island.
14	"The Last Groundhog"	Fabien Limousin; Cédric Stephan	Louis Musso; Cédric Dietsch	July 31, 2019	114
Mr Magoo mistakes Weasel - who is dressed in an animal costume - for a groundhog being hunted down, so he confiscates a hunter's gun.
15	"Hamster Fishing"	Fanny Courtilot	Cédric Dietsch; Richard Méril	August 7, 2019	
Fizz is at the pool because he wants to start sub-marine hairdressing, but Mr Magoo thinks that he is fishing in a lake and starts trying to catch Weasel.
16	"Nice Little Doggy"	Hugo Gittard	Louis Musso	August 14, 2019	103
Mr Magoo is handing out food to neighbourhood animals when he stumbles on a gigantic hamster that Fizz has released from a parallel dimension.
17	"Home Havoc"	Hugo Gittard	Louis Musso; Cédric Dietsch	August 21, 2019	114
Mr Magoo can't find a book that Linda lent him - he's ready to turn his house upside down to find it, but the problem is that he's actually in Fizz's loft...
18	"Whiter Than White"	Ségolène Basso-Bruca	Cédric Dietsch; Richard Méril	August 28, 2019	118
Magoo thinks that he's at the laundromat when he wanders into a sweet factory where Fizz and Weasel are creating a bubble-gum that makes Fizz-shaped bubbles.
19	"Fizz Tower"	Hugo Gittard	Louis Musso; Cédric Dietsch	September 4, 2019	
Thinking that he's hunting down a rat in his attic, Mr Magoo finds himself at a theme park devoted to the glory of Fizz.
20	"HibernaFizz"	Fabien Limousin; Cédric Stephan	Cédric Dietsch; Richard Méril	September 11, 2019	
Mr Magoo comes across Fizz encased in ice and thinks that he has found a prehistoric man, so he thaws him out and acts like a caveman so as not to distress him.
21	"Doctor Magoo"	Hugo Gittard	Louis Musso; Cédric Dietsch	September 18, 2019	
Mr Magoo thinks that he's helping out at an understaffed veterinary clinic - in fact, he's at a supermarket where Fizz is trying to sell his cleaning products.
22	"Space Hamster"	David Sauerwein	Cédric Dietsch; Richard Méril	September 25, 2019	
In order to make himself an object of worship, Fizz makes people believe that he's an alien who has come to Earth to share his wisdom. Magoo mistaking Fizz are his favorite singer.
23	"Poolwatch!"	Gaël Gittard	Louis Musso; Cédric Dietsch	October 2, 2019	
Mr Magoo thinks that his whole neighbourhood has been flooded - in reality, he is actually just at the local swimming pool.
24	"Magoo in Shining Armor"	Nils Mathieu; Moïra Bérard; David Sauerwein	Stéphane Annette	October 9, 2019	
While on a construction site, Mr Magoo thinks that he's been hired for a medieval theatre show - Fizz and Weasel then bump into him at the top of a tower.
25	"Baby Steps"	Hugo Gittard	Jean-Charles André; Cédric Dietsch	October 16, 2019	
When Mr Magoo is babysitting a toddler belonging to some of his neighbours, the baby flees and kidnaps Fizz while mistaking him for a plush toy.
26	"Ghost Hunt"	Jordan Raux	Kevin Audi-Grivetta	October 23, 2019	136
Fizz invents a machine which stops toast from landing butter side down, Mr Magoo sees some floating toast and believes that a ghost is haunting their house.
27	"Toes in the Sand"	Fabien Limousin; Cédric Stephan	Louis Musso; Richard Méril	October 30, 2019	
Mr Magoo thinks that he is on a beach and that sailors are emptying an oil tanker right into the ocean.
28	"Santa's Little Helper"	Hugo Gittard	Louis Musso; Cédric Dietsch	November 6, 2019	
Mr Magoo has become a Christmas volunteer in a supermarket - when he thinks a burglar is entering overnight, he decides to stop him.
29	"Mega Magoo Versus Dr. Fizz"	Vincent Souchon	Richard Méril	November 13, 2019	135
Fizz is controlling a robot that is distributing ice cream to everyone in the city - when Mr Magoo mistakes him for a monster, he gets sprayed with ice cream.
30	"At the Heart of the Crater"	Jordan Raux	Louis Musso; Cédric Dietsch	November 20, 2019	128
Mr Magoo thinks that he is at the foot of a volcano, but he's actually next to a huge soup vat.
31	"Dusk of the Cucumber"	Giulia Volli	Louis Musso; Cédric Dietsch	November 27, 2019	133
Fizz invents a cucumber that turns people into objects of worship, but when Mr Magoo sees people being drawn to Fizz and Weasel, he thinks that they are zombies.
32	"Spinning Headlock Elbow Drop"	Nicolas Le Nevé	Louis Musso	December 4, 2019	
Mr Magoo thinks that he is auditioning for a circus troop, but he is actually in a professional wrestling ring in the middle of a fight.
33	"Lost in the Subway"	Jordan Raux	Louis Musso	December 11, 2019	129
Mr Magoo thinks that he is in the subway, but he's actually in a cave - running into Weasel, Mr Magoo thinks that he's lost and decides to help him find his way.
34	"Dinosaur Island"	Solenn Le Priol; Giulia Volli	Stéphane Annette	December 18, 2019	
Fizz has reduced the size of the Moon in order to model it in his own image, but Mr Magoo thinks that it's a dinosaur egg ready to hatch.
35	"Saving the Gnomes of Astroturf"	Julien Dinse	Richard Méril	December 25, 2019	132
When Mr Magoo mistakes some children at a park for gnomes in a magic forest, Fizz uses a remote control to immobilise them to win over their parents.
36	"Golden Fizz"	Fabien Limousin; Cédric Stephan	Stéphane Annette	January 1, 2020	
Fizz plans on replacing the statue from an Oscar-like ceremony with a statue in his image, but Mr Magoo grabs it thinking that it's for sale in a store.
37	"Dances with Walruses"	Hugo Gittard	Stéphane Annette	January 8, 2020	
When Mr Magoo thinks that he's herding cattle through the desert but is in fact on an ice floe with walruses, he mistakes Fizz and Weasel for cattle rustlers.
38	"Love Thy Neighbour"	Vincent Souchon Based on the idea by: Giulia Volli	Jean-Charles André	January 15, 2020	
Mr Magoo thinks that he is housesitting for Weasel - when he sees Weasel returning from the grocery store with Fizz, he thinks that they're burglars.
39	"Not Without My Hamster"	Joël Nsita	Kevin Audi-Grivetta	January 22, 2020	
Fizz and Weasel are at the supermarket buying ingredients to make the world's best cake - they bump into Mr Magoo, who thinks that he's at a carnival.
40	"The Curse of the Pyramid"	David Sauerwein	Kevin Audi-Grivetta	January 29, 2020	
Mr Magoo thinks that he is lost in a pyramid, but he is in fact in a big conference room where Fizz is about to perform a stand-up act.
41	"The Bodyguard"	Giulia Volli	Louis Musso; Sandrine Normand	February 5, 2020	
Fizz has dressed Weasel up as a supervillain in order to pretend to save the city, but Mr Magoo mistakes his disguised neighbour for an actor in danger.
42	"Concrete Jungle"	Jordan Raux	Stéphane Annette	February 12, 2020	
Weasel accidentally launches Fizz next to Mr Magoo - the latter, believing that he is driving through a wildlife reserve, mistakes Fizz for a lost child.
43	"Deep Sea Diving"	Fabien Limousin	Richard Méril; Louis Musso	February 19, 2020	
Mr Magoo thinks that he's underwater scooting and has discovered Atlantis - in reality, he's in New York and riding Fizz's latest invention.
44	"Magoo the Sorcerer"	Jordan Raux	Richard Méril; Louis Musso	February 26, 2020	144
Fizz and Weasel are trying to steal the president's jokebook when Mr Magoo, thinking that he is visiting a museum of sorcery, mistakes Weasel for a wizard.
45	"Magoo, A Wrinkle in Time"	Hugo Gittard	Richard Méril; Louis Musso	March 5, 2020	
Fizz has invented a hoverboard - after a slip-up, the board ends up in the hands of Mr Magoo, who thinks that he has found a new ironing board.
46	"The Nanogamba Tribe"	Julien Dinse	Richard Méril; Louis Musso	March 12, 2020	
Fizz falls into the sewers and bumps into Mr Magoo, who thinks that he's exploring the jungle - the latter then mistakes Fizz for a lost child...
47	"Mountain Rescue"	Jordan Raux	Christophe Pinto	March 19, 2020	
Fizz and Weasel plan a fireworks display for Fizz in the desert, but mountain rescuer Mr Magoo mistakes Weasel for a skier in distress.
48	"The Great Outdoors"	Joël Nsita	Stéphane Annette	March 26, 2020	
Mr Magoo sets up camp by a rare fruit patch in the forest, giving a warm welcome to a bear that he has mistaken for a wayward hiker.
49	"Shaaaaark!"	David Sauerwein	Cédric Dietsch; Louis Musso	April 2, 2020	
Mr Magoo thinks that he's a beach lifeguard, but he is actually on an ice floe and the swimmers are penguins.
50	"Kung Fizz"	David Sauerwein	Richard Méril; Louis Musso	April 9, 2020	
Fizz and Weasel are after the president's jokebook when Mr Magoo, thinking that he's in his dojo, enters the high-security unit where it's kept...
51	"Air Magoo"	Simon Perrin	Stéphane Annette	April 16, 2020	
Mr Magoo's going to miss his flight - unfortunately, he's at the supermarket where Fizz and Weasel are hatching their latest plan and not at the airport...
52	"The Prophecy of the Goldensand's Dragon"	Julien Dinse	Richard Méril; Louis Musso	April 23, 2020	
Fizz is at the beach building a sandcastle, but Mr Magoo thinks they are preparing to thwart an attack by an enemy riding a dragon.
53	"AeroFizz!"	Jordan Raux	Christophe Pinto	April 30, 2020	
Weasel tries for his AeroFizz pilot's licence, but Mr Magoo - convinced that he's fixing his roof - ruins everything when he pierces a hole in Fizz's airship.
54	"Hornets Attack!"	Jordan Raux	Christophe Pinto	May 7, 2020	
Fizz and Weasel shoot people with toy arrows to make them fall in love with Fizz, but Mr Magoo mistakes them for a giant hornet.
55	"Star Man"	Julien Dinse	Stéphane Annette	May 14, 2020	
Fizz rehearses a dance number that'll make him a star, but when Weasel catapults him next door onto the roof, Mr Magoo thinks that he's a stray alien.
56	"The Last Oak Tree Standing"	Joël Nsita; Simon Perrin	Kevin Audi-Grivetta	May 21, 2020	
Fizz and Weasel set up a super-antenna in the desert, but when Mr Magoo ends up beside them, he mistakes the antenna for a forest's last oak tree.
57	"Super Duper Sale"	Julien Dinse	Kevin Audi-Grivetta	May 28, 2020	
Fizz and Weasel hack the world's internet server while hidden inside a robot, but Mr Magoo - who is shopping in the sales - mistakes the robot for a shopping cart and takes it with him.
58	"Chill Out"	Julien Dinse	Christophe Pinto; Louis Musso	June 4, 2020	
Fizz is recording chill music to destress his world and needs quiet - unfortunately, Mr Magoo's come over to borrow a wrench and thinks that there's a leak...
59	"Sweet Dreams Mr. Cat"	Hugo Gittard	Kevin Audi-Grivetta	June 11, 2020	
Fizz beams himself into Weasel's brain in order to take out Mr Magoo with tranquilliser darts - meanwhile, Mr Magoo loses Mr Cat and enlists his neighbour to find him.
60	"Man of Steel"	Joël Nsita; Julien Dinse	Richard Méril; Christophe Pinto	June 18, 2020	161
Mr Magoo thinks that he's in a triathlon and takes Fizz's superhuman strength headband, but Fizz needs the headband to beat the President at a thumb war.
61	"Fizz FM"	Simon Perrin	Kevin Audi-Grivetta	June 25, 2020	
Today is a big day for Mr Magoo who believes that he's in a recording studio to make a hit single for famous producer Phil Dustspeck, but is that true?
62	"Magoo 2.0"	Joe Vitale	Richard Méril; Louis Musso	July 2, 2020	
Fizz tests a ray that makes people dance, but Mr Magoo - wearing a snorkelling mask that he's convinced is a virtual reality gaming headset - mistakes the ray for a weapon.
63	"Vanilla Strawberry Meltdown"	Julien Dinse; Joël Nsita	Richard Méril	July 9, 2020	
Thinking that he's on an Arctic expedition while actually at the beach, Mr Magoo mistakes Fizz for a monkey and definitive evidence of global warming.
64	"Mr. Fixit"	Hugo Gittard	Sandrine Normand	July 16, 2020	
Thinking that he's fixing Weasel's coffee maker, Mr Magoo actually ends up tweaking Fizz's teleporter, an invention that the hamster plans to exhibit at an innovation trade show.
65	"Brainwashed"	Joël Nsita	Christophe Pinto	July 23, 2020	
While helping Linda clean her attic, Mr Magoo gets shrunken down and teleported into Fizz's brain which Magoo thinks is due for a good spring clean.
66	"MAG007"	David Sauerwein; Jean-Louis Momus; Lison d'Andrea	Richard Méril	July 30, 2020	
Mr Magoo mistakes Fizz for a toy containing top-secret information that he has stolen from a secret agent, but it's actually just Weasel!
67	"The Gluttons for Punishment"	Julien Dinse	Christophe Pinto	August 6, 2020	
Fizz and Weasel plan to enter Fizz's new condiment in a culinary contest, but Mr Magoo mistakes them for members of his band ready for a reunion.
68	"Welcome to Translovenia"	Joël Nsita; Julien Dinse Based on the idea by: Simon Perrin	Kevin Audi-Grivetta	August 13, 2020	
Mr Magoo thinks that he's on a trip to Translovenia and takes shelter in a mansion owned by a vampire - in reality, this vampire is just Weasel...
69	"Maggie Magoo"	Joël Nsita; Julien Dinse	Kevin Audi-Grivetta	August 20, 2020	
A bear has escaped from the zoo and Fizz is hell-bent on making it his pet, but Mr Magoo mistakes the bear for his niece and thinks it's come to spend the day with him.
70	"Magoo's Best Friend"	Hugo Gittard	Stéphane Annette	August 27, 2020	
Mr Magoo mistakes Fizz for his best friend Harry from school and thinks that the two of them are visiting their old alma mater.
71	"7 Minutes Flat"	Julien Dinse	Christophe Pinto	September 3, 2020	
Weasel is testing out Fizz's latest invention - a three-piece swimsuit to make beachgoers look chic - when Mr Magoo mistakes him for the President.
72	"Family Meal"	David Sauerwein	Christophe Pinto	September 10, 2020	
Fizz wants to cure Mr Magoo's near-sightedness for good - he and Weasel go over to his house, only to be mistaken by Mr Magoo as his parents on a surprise visit.
73	"MAG007 is Back"	David Sauerwein	Kevin Audi-Grivetta	September 17, 2020	
Fizz writes a genius plan on a note that gets stuck to Mr Magoo's forehead - when Weasel tries to get it back, Mr Magoo thinks that he's being pursued by spies.
74	"Here Kitty"	David Sauerwein	Richard Méril	September 24, 2020	
As Fizz gets ready to travel to another dimension populated entirely by other Fizzes, Mr Magoo turns up and thinks that Weasel has a new kitten.
75	"Ratman"	Jordan Raux	Sandrine Normand	October 1, 2020	
Mr Magoo mistakes Fizz for billionaire Bruce Payne, who is also known as the superhero Ratman - when Ratman is kidnapped, Mr Magoo decides to save the day!
76	"Free the Rabbit!"	Hugo Gittard	Christophe Pinto	October 8, 2020	
Weasel tends to Fizz's toothache, but Mr Magoo turns up thinking that he's busting into an animal testing lab.
77	"Free Weasel"	Julien Dinse; David Sauerwein Based on the idea by: Giulia Volli	Sandrine Normand	October 17, 2019	
Mr Magoo mistakes Weasel for a tuna being pursued by a fisherman. Note: This episode has since only aired in the United Kingdom and as of now can only be watched/accessed on CITV/ITVX.
78	"The Letter to Santa Claus"	Louis Frélicot	Kévin Audi-Grivetta	December 20, 2019	
Mr Magoo forgets to include Mr Cat in his letter to Santa - to make amends he follows Weasel, who is dressed as an elf, to the AeroFizz. Note: This episode has since only aired in the United Kingdom and as of now can only be watched/accessed on CITV/ITVX.

=== Season 2 (2022–23) ===
Note: Currently, the following episodes can only be watched/accessed on CITV/ITVX in the United Kingdom (only the first 39 episodes aired on CITV; the remaining 33 episodes are exclusive to ITVX).

It has been announced that the season also contains three 21-minute specials. These specials reveal the characters' origins and show how they all met each other.

No.	Title	Written by	Storyboarded by	Original release date	Prod. code
1	"Matchmaker Magoo"	Sabine Cipolla; Jawad Wachill	Christophe Pinto	December 10, 2022	
It's Valentine's Day! While Fizz is in rapture over his Fizzroses, Magoo plans the perfect date for Weasel and Linda as he takes them on a sewer tour.
2	"Potato Head"	Alice Boucherit	Amaury Allaire	December 10, 2022	
To make the world's biggest fries, Fizz invents the Fizzometer. But Weasel messes up and shrinks Fizz! Magoo is fascinated by all things tiny.
3	"The Great Escape"	Valérie Fageol	Mathilde Prévost; Jean-Charles Finck	December 10, 2022	
Magoo likes the idea of having fresh eggs every morning, but his newly adopted hen Jeanine has disappeared! He goes to Weasel's house and mistakes Fizz for the bird!
4	"Action!"	Alice Boucherit	Mathilde Prévost	December 10, 2022	
Aspiring to be a great movie director, Fizz tries to shoot a heroic fantasy film with Weasel dressed in a ridiculous horse costume.
5	"Fizz Junior"	Sabine Cipolla; Jawad Wachill	Pierre Brissaud	December 10, 2022	
To compensate for his lack of physical strength, Fizz creates Fizz-Junior, a super-powerful hamster. Magoo mistakes Junior for a kid.
6	"Beauty Fizz"	Alice Boucherit	Amaury Allaire	December 10, 2022	
Fizz tries to become an influencer in the makeup industry. To get more likes, he organises a meet-up for his subscribers, but Magoo steals the limelight.
7	"Transmorgafizz"	Alice Boucherit	Kevin Audi Grivetta	December 10, 2022	
Fizz uses the TransmorgaFizz to give Weasel a more muscular body, but the invention ends up in Mr Magoo's hands and our hero turns Fizz into a chihuahua.
8	"Fizz Magic"	Csaba Zombori	Mathilde Prévost	December 11, 2022	
Fizz wants to test out the PrestodigiousFizz - a magic wand - during a magic show, but when he runs into Magoo, he mistakes him for someone else.
9	"Mama Weasel"	Sabine Cipolla; Jawad Wachill	Kevin Audi Grivetta	December 11, 2022	
While Magoo is on a witch hunt, Weasel receives a surprise visit from his bitter, waspy, old-fashioned mother. Fizz and Mrs. Weasel's first encounter is explosive. Note: This episode introduces Weasel's mother (his father is only referred to), who is just as evil as Fizz.
10	"House of Horrors"	Emmanuel Leduc	Amaury Allaire	December 11, 2022	
Magoo has a date with Marnie. He intends to take her to a fun park but ends up in an abandoned factory instead. This spells trouble for Fizz.
11	"Making a Racket"	Juilette Bas	Pierre Brissaud	December 11, 2022	
Fizz creates a trick racket that will allow him to beat the President in a publicity beach tennis match. But, Magoo makes off with it.
12	"All About Fizz"	Fanny Courtillot	Mathilde Prévost	December 11, 2022	
Mr Magoo undertakes an archaeological dig, but when he ends up in a bank vault that contains Fizz's personal diary, he thinks that he's made a major historical discovery.
13	"The Amazing Colossal Magoo"	Pauline Rostain	Pierre Brissaud	December 11, 2022	
Fizz creates a laser to enlarge clothes which have shrunk in the wash. But Magoo, preparing for a field trip, mistakes the invention for a camera.
14	"Hot Dog with Relish"	Csaba Zombori	Kevin Audi Grivetta	December 11, 2022	
Mr. Cat comes across Fizz's new invention, a ray gun which turns objects into food. He takes it, resolving to turn everything that moves into hot dogs.
15	"Paloneon the 1st"	Alice Boucherit	Marc-Antoine Buhagiar	December 12, 2022	
Magoo is persuaded that Fizz is Panoleon the First, a dangerous tyrant returned from history. Magoo tries to send him back into his history book.
16	"Amazon Return"	Csaba Zombori	Pierre Brissaud	December 12, 2022	
Magoo believes he's in the Amazon rainforest. Finding Fizz's plush toy, he mistakes it for the legendary idol of the Nanoshrimp.
17	"Abominable Showman"	Marie Eynard	Amaury Allaire	December 12, 2022	
Weasel, disguised as a supervillain atop a building under construction, has taken the President hostage. Fizz prepares to act out a heroic rescue.
18	"Heavy Enlightenment"	Nils Gaillard	Pierre Brissaud	December 12, 2022	
Fizz develops a yoga sequence which allows one to experience complete serenity. While demonstrating to the masses, he's interrupted by Magoo.
19	"Sock It to 'Em"	Emmanuel Leduc	Amaury Allaire	December 13, 2022	
Fizz discovers the hidden dimension where lost socks go. He invents a machine to bring them back, but when they appear, they take on a life of their own.
20	"Fizzmas"	Alice Boucherit	Marc-Antoine Buhagiar	December 13, 2022	
Fizz wants to be as popular as Santa Claus, so leaves presents on everyone's doorsteps. But Magoo launches Operation Clean Streets and throws the gifts away.
21	"No More Mr. Nicefizz"	Juliette Bas	Kevin Audi Grivetta	December 13, 2022	
Fizz creates a robot designed to service the residents of the city. When his android picks up Marnie's misplaced handkerchief, Magoo gets jealous.
22	"Little Green Man"	Marie Eynard	Yann Provost	January 31, 2023	
Fizz wants to create a fascinating mystery about himself - while he traces his giant geoglyphs portrait in the desert sand, Mr Magoo appears with his golfing gear.
23	"Forest Grump"	Fanny Courtillot	Léa Cousty	January 31, 2023	
His genius still unappreciated, Fizz decides to go on a spiritual retreat in a forest clearing, but Mr Magoo mistakes the hamster for a feral child.
24	"Speechless"	Anna Kriegel	Romain Cislo	January 31, 2023	
Fizz invents a device that can render anyone mute, but when Mr Magoo gets his hands on the invention, Fizz and Weasel end up being mistaken for Parisian mimes.
25	"Dorkdorf's Treasure"	Tristan Deschamps; Julien Gallet	Amaury Allaire	February 1, 2023	
Fizz tries out a device that controls the weather, but when Mr Magoo finds the remote control of the machine, he thinks he's on a treasure hunt.
26	"Best in Show"	Fanny Courtillot	Marc-Antoine Buhagiar	February 1, 2023	
Fizz wants to win a contest to find the world's most incredible animal, but Mr Magoo appears with Mr Cat while thinking that he's at the groomer's.
27	"Panda-Monium"	Nils Gaillard	Yann Provost	February 1, 2023	
Fizz steals the President's panda - whoever has an animal that cute will surely attain power and glory, but it escapes Weasel and ends up with Mr Magoo.
28	"Weasel the Genius"	Csaba Zombori	Mathilde Prévost	February 2, 2023	
Fizz's latest invention is derailed and Weasel suddenly becomes very intelligent - he decides to improve Fizz's plans, but the two then fall out.
29	"Home Remedy"	Marie Eynard	Kévin Audi-Grivetta	February 2, 2023	
Weasel sneezes and Fizz, who is a complete hypochondriac, is convinced that his assistant is sick - fortunately, Mr Magoo shows up to pamper his neighbour.
30	"Happy Birthday to Me"	Marie Eynard	Kévin Audi-Grivetta	February 2, 2023	
The birthdays of Fizz and Mr Magoo fall on the same day - Mr Cat organises a party for his owner, but Weasel has nothing planned for Fizz..
31	"Treasure Hunt"	Alice Boucherit; Anaïs Lebeau	Jérôme Fardini	February 3, 2023	
Fizz demands a ransom from Mr Magoo and sends him an anonymous letter with a meeting point, but Mr Magoo mistakes the letter for a treasure map...
32	"Sink or Swim"	Marie Eynard	Romain Cislo	February 3, 2023	
Mr Magoo, who is on a rooftop, believes he's by the sea - when he dives in to save a drowning swimmer, Fizz's laser causes him to become weightless.
33	"Perspiration, Inspiration"	Emmanuel Leduc	Léa Cousty	February 3, 2023	
When Mr Magoo replaces his friend Serge for the day as a personal trainer, he comes to Weasel's house and finds that Fizz is out of ideas!
34	"Captain Magoo"	Sabine Cipolla; Jawad Wachill	Marc-Antoine Buhagiar	February 6, 2023	
While Mr Magoo prepares for a spin on his new boat, he notices the Aerofizz in the distance and becomes convinced that he's under attack from a ghost ship.
35	"Smells Like Mean Spirit"	Pauline Rostain	Kévin Audi-Grivetta	February 7, 2023	
During a heatwave, Fizz installs a giant fan at the top of a building under construction to cool down the city while diffusing his scent.
36	"Weasel While You Work"	Alice Boucherit; Anaïs Lebeau	Romain Cislo	February 8, 2023	
In order to abolish work, Fizz replaces the city's workers with clones, but Mr Magoo mistakes them for extraterrestrials and teaches them to relax.
37	"Animal Attraction"	Alice Boucherit; Anaïs Lebeau	Wandrille Manoury	February 9, 2023	
In order to become a superhero, Fizz invents a scanner that allows him to take on the physical abilities of animals and tests it in the park.
38	"Scratch Me If You Can"	Csaba Zombori	Romain Rossard	February 10, 2023	
When a flea epidemic breaks out in the city, Fizz takes advantage of it to invent a flute that repels the parasites, then sends Weasel to test it.
39	"Fizzochio"	Fanny Courtillot	Jérôme Fardini	February 13, 2023	
Mr Magoo finds his childhood puppet and wants to have it repaired, but he turns up at Weasel's house when mistakenly thinking that it's the toy repair shop.
40	"Home Alone"	Juliette Bas	Charles Saussol	December 10, 2022	
41	"Aisle of the Lost"	Valérie Fageol	Marc-Antoine Buhagiar	December 10, 2022	
42	"Birthday Surprise"	Marie Eynard	Romain Cislo	December 10, 2022	
43	"Rose-Colored Glasses"	Marie Eynard	Jean-Louis Champault	December 10, 2022	
44	"Joke Machine"	Juliette Bas	Kévin Audi-Grivetta	December 10, 2022	
45	"Pop Music"	Csaba Zombori	Jérôme Fardini	December 10, 2022	
46	"Dogfight"	Anaïs Lebeau	Charles Saussol	December 10, 2022	
47	"Fool's Gold"	Anaïs Lebeau	Romain Cislo	December 10, 2022	
48	"Mr. Cat's Got Your Tongue"	Fanny Courtillot	Guillaume Bracciali	December 10, 2022	
49	"GraFizz"	Anaïs Lebeau	Jean-Louis Champault	December 10, 2022	
50	"Sweet Dreams!"	Pauline Rostain	Kévin Audi-Grivetta	December 10, 2022	
51	"Love Thy Neighbor"	Valérie Fageol	Jérôme Fardini	December 10, 2022	
52	"Endangered Species"	Juliette Bas	Nina Degrendel	December 10, 2022	
53	"AeroFizz One"	Emmanuel Leduc	Charles Saussol	December 10, 2022	
54	"Cucumber Carnival"	Anaïs Lebeau	Laury Rovelli	December 10, 2022	
55	"Open House"	Csaba Zombori	Guillaume Bracciali	December 10, 2022	
56	"Unsung Zeros"	Juliette Bas	Boris Brenot	December 10, 2022	
57	"Gangbuster Magoo"	Sabine Cipolla	Charles Saussol	December 10, 2022	
58	"Fizz: Origins"	Sabine Cipolla	Jean-Louis Champault; Romain Cislo	December 10, 2022	
Note: This is a triple-length episode.
59	"Warm and Fizzies"	Emmanuel Leduc	Nina Degrendel	December 10, 2022	
60	"The Clean Marnie Method"	Nils Gaillard	Kévin Audi-Grivetta	December 10, 2022	
61	"Oracle Magoo"	Alice Boucherit; Anaïs Lebeau	Jérôme Fardini	December 10, 2022	
62	"A Monkey Wrench in the Works"	Juliette Bas	Boris Brenot	December 10, 2022	
63	"Mr. Cat vs. the Cat Burglar"	Csaba Zombori	Charles Saussol	December 10, 2022	
64	"Mr. Cat, Secret Agent"	Sabine Cipolla	Nina Degrendel; Jérôme Fardini	December 10, 2022	
Note: This is a triple-length episode.
65	"Magoo Without Pier"	Pauline Rostain	Jean-Louis Champault	December 10, 2022	
66	"Magoo Junior"	Jawad Wachill	Kévin Audi-Grivetta; Romain Cislo	December 10, 2022	
Note: This is a triple-length episode.
67	"Change of Scenery"	Csaba Zombori	Boris Brenot	December 10, 2022	
68	"Oil's Well That Ends Well"	Pauline Rostain	Charles Saussol	December 10, 2022	
69	"Cat and Weasel in the Same Boat"	Csaba Zombori	Charles Saussol	December 10, 2022	
70	"Feline Groovy"	Alice Boucherit	Sandrine Normand	December 10, 2022	
71	"Fizz's New Assistant"	Nils Gaillard	Boris Brenot	December 10, 2022	
72	"Horror Movie"	Pauline Rostain	Yann Provost	December 10, 2022	

== Broadcast ==
Country	Channel	Premiere date
Portugal	SIC K	December 17, 2018
Belgium	La Trois	January 6, 2019
Italy	K2; DeA Kids	February 4, 2019
Canada	Ici Radio-Canada Télé	April 1, 2019
United Kingdom	CITV; Nicktoons	April 8, 2019 (CITV)/July 6, 2020 (Nicktoons) (Season 1); December 10, 2022 (CITV) (Season 2)
UNASUR; Brazil y El Salvador	Discovery Kids y Lorena	April 15, 2019/March 7, 2026
France	France 4 Boomerang; France 3	May 4, 2019
Turkey	Boomerang	August 5, 2019
Australia	ABC Me	2019
Germany; Austria; Switzerland	Super RTL; Boomerang; Cartoon Network	September 27, 2019
Southeast Asia	Cartoon Network	2019
Sub-Sahara Africa	Boomerang Africa HD	June 3, 2019
India	Cartoon Network; Sony YAY!	July 2019 (Cartoon Network); December 26, 2022 (Sony YAY!)
Greece; Middle East; North Africa	Boomerang MENA	September 1, 2019
United States	Paramount+	January 16, 2020
Benelux; Central Europe; Balkans; Eastern Europe	Boomerang (CEE); Cartoon Network (Central and Eastern Europe)	August 3, 2020
CIS; Southern-Eastern Europe	Cartoon Network Russia	April 12, 2021
