= Olivier Jean-Marie =

French animator (1960–2021)

- Born: Olivier Christophe Hervé Jean-Marie; 19 November 1960; Brunoy, France
- Died: 13 May 2021 (aged 60); Rueil-Malmaison, France
- Education: Beaux-Arts de Paris
- Occupations: Animator; storyboard artist; screenwriter; director
- Years active: 1986–2021
- Notable work: Oggy and the Cockroaches; Zig & Sharko; Space Goofs
- Spouse: Agnés Jean-Marie
- Children: Ianka Jean-Marie; Julie Jean-Marie

Olivier Christophe Hervé Jean-Marie (19 November 1960 – 13 May 2021) was a French animator, storyboard artist, and filmmaker. He was notable for his work on Oggy and the Cockroaches, Space Goofs, and Zig & Sharko.

Jean-Marie died in his home of cancer at age 60. He had a wife, Agnes, and two daughters, Ianka and Julie. Jean-Marie was a loyal friend of Belgian animator and designer Jan Van Rijsselberge.

== Filmography ==
Film	Role	Years
Snow White: The Sequel	Storyboard	2007
Go West! A Lucky Luke Adventure	Co-writer, storyboard, and director	2007
Oggy and the Cockroaches: The Movie	Writer and director	2013

== Television ==
Film	Role	Years
Patrol 03	Original character design	1997–1998
Space Goofs	Writer, storyboarder, animation director (only in season 1), director (only in season 2)	1997–2006
Oggy and the Cockroaches	Writer, storyboarder, director	1999–present
The New Adventures of Lucky Luke	Writer, storyboarder, director	2001–2003
Ratz	Writer	2003–2004
The Daltons	Writer, co-adapted	2010–2016
Kaeloo	Writer (only in season 1)	2010
Zig & Sharko	Creator, original design, writer, storyboarder, director (only in season 1)	2010–present
Rabbids Invasion	Writer (only for "Omelet Party")	2013
Rolling with the Ronks!	Co-creator	2016–2017
Mr. Magoo	Adapted	2019–2023
Sunnyside Billy	Co-creator; posthumous release in Q1 2023	2023

== Bibliography ==
- Blaster, Jean-Marie, Olivier. Les Zinzins de l'espace (Volume 1). France: Jungle, 2006; ISBN 2874421367
- Blaster, Jean-Marie, Olivier. Les Zinzins de l'espace (Volume 2). France: Jungle, 2006; ISBN 2874421375
