= Marc du Pontavice =

French animator and producer (born 1963)

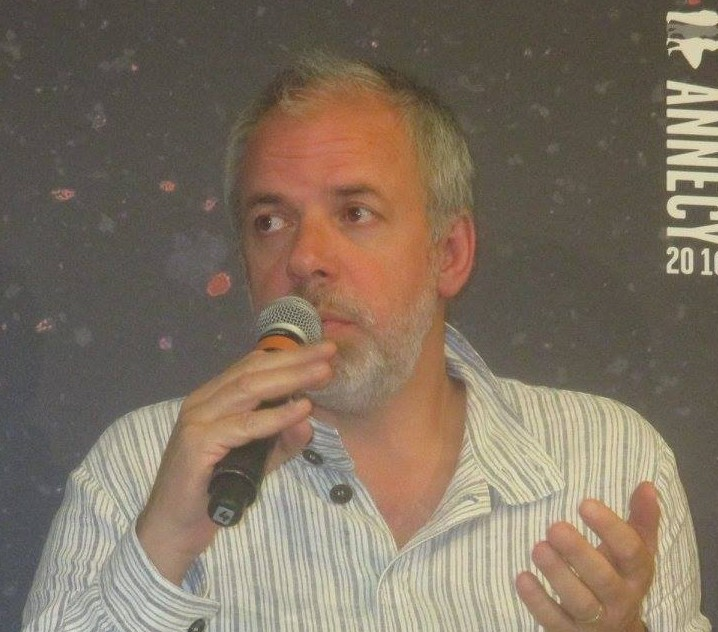
- Du Pontavice at the 2016 Annecy International Animation Film Festival
- Born: Marc Marie Joseph Raymond du Pontavice; 10 January 1963 (age 63); Paris, France
- Education: Collège Stanislas; Lycée Jules-Ferry; Sciences Po
- Occupations: Animator; producer; designer
- Known for: Xilam
- Notable work: Oggy and the Cockroaches; Space Goofs; Zig & Sharko; Ratz; Floopaloo, Where Are You? Gainsbourg: A Heroic Life; I Lost My Body; Lucy Lost
- Spouse: Alix de Maistre (m. 1989)
- Children: Lou du Pontavice; Ivan du Pontavice
- Awards: 2 César Awards
- Honours: Knight of Ordre national du Mérite (2014)

Signature
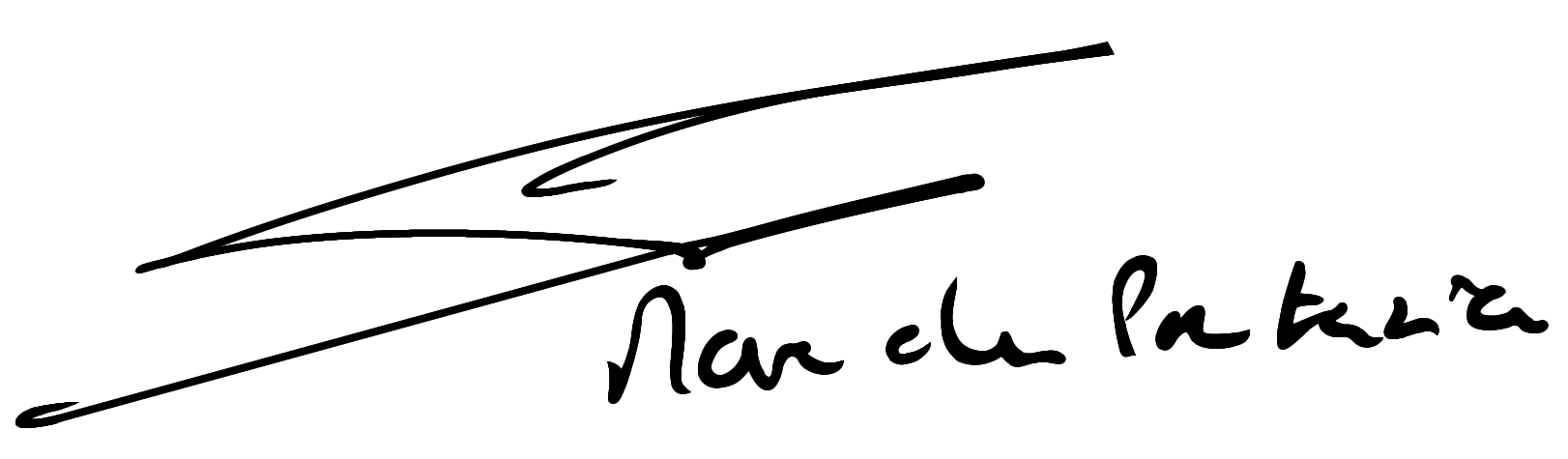

Marc Marie Joseph Raymond du Pontavice (born 10 January 1963) is a French animator, producer and designer, known for Oggy and the Cockroaches, Space Goofs, Zig & Sharko, Ratz, Floopaloo, Where Are You?, Gainsbourg: A Heroic Life, Lucy Lost and others. He was nominated for an Academy Award for Best Animated Feature for producing I Lost My Body (2019). He was an executive producer from Gaumont, which is based in France. In 1990, he was the co-founder of Gaumont Television. In 1994, the company started producing animated series, which was eventually transformed into Gaumont Multimédia in 1995. After leaving the company, he, along with Alix de Maistre, founded Xilam.

Du Pontavice is the CEO of Xilam and its sister studio, Cube Creative (which Xilam acquired in 2020), since 2023, replacing Cube's founder, Lionel Fages, who stepped down as CEO. He is also the co-founder and CEO of French live-action film studio, One World Films.

== Early life ==
Born on January 10, 1963, in the 15th arrondissement of Paris, he is the son of academic professor Emmanuel du Pontavice and doctor Anne de Pardieu. Marc comes from the Breton nobility, the du Pontavice family. Marc's parents never worked in French cinema and rarely took him to theaters; his grandmother was the one who took him to the legendary theater in the 7th arrondissement of Paris, La Pagode. When he turned seven, his parents agreed to show him a film they liked, Charlie Chaplin's City Lights. Every Sunday, he watched the program he never missed, Histoires sans paroles on ORTF. He also visited the Musée Grévin and read the novel War of the Buttons as a child. A calling to cinema came late to du Pontavice and almost by chance, after he had been rejected for the second time by the École nationale supérieure, where he initially devoted himself to literature. In the adolescence, his schooling was a succession of failures when he was 16 and his family life was a disaster. Du Pontavice studied at a Jesuit college near Bonn in Germany, chosen by his parents, where he spent the first two months in absolute silence, without conversation and surrounded by strangers. Calmed by the power of silence, he spent his days reading, mostly poetry and few novels from Arthur Rimbaud, Comte de Lautréamont, Charles Baudelaire, René Char, Larry Beckett, Eugène Ionesco, Albert Camus and Jean-Paul Sartre.

As a child, du Pontavice suffered childhood trauma due to the sexual abuse he suffered at the hands of his mother, who violently beat him, locked him in the closet, and separated him from his siblings' games, since his parents' marriage was a failure because his mother was a lesbian, which led neighbors to complain to the police about du Pontavice's screaming, as he was suffering abuse at her hands. The abuse ended when she left him and his father in 1986 to move to the USA. Du Pontavice would not meet his mother again upon her death 30 years later in 2016. Preparing for the ENS brought him three years of freedom from worry. He was captivated by the idea of becoming a producer and dedicating himself to art and imagery. Du Pontavice had no connections in that field and saw no clear path to entry, but one thing that stood out in his research was the frequency of bankruptcies. At the time, the profession was particularly risky, and producers, who generally lacked economic and financial training, were often viewed as poor managers. Du Pontavice considered pursuing training that would serve as a strong credential for breaking into the industry. He studied at Sciences Po and graduated from the Eco-Fi section in 1989, after having studied there for three years starting in 1986. Du Pontavice received training in 1988 during an internship with Claude Abeille, who had worked with Daniel Toscan du Plantier and taught him about the legal structures of a feature film.

== Career ==
Du Pontavice began his career at the world's oldest film studio, Gaumont, in 1990, after the studio joined forces with CFC-Groupe Robur to create Gaumont-Robur Télévision, led by Christian Charret, whose goal was to produce high-quality television series for European television channels. Then legal and financial manager of CFC-Groupe Robur from 1989 to 1990, after managing the financial organization and the production of about one hundred hours of fiction at Robur, du Pontavice became secretary-general of the new division. In 1992, after selling its film catalog to UGC, Robur also sold its stake in Gaumont-Robur Télévision to Gaumont, which subsequently renamed it Gaumont Television.

In 1993, encouraged by the success of the Highlander series, du Pontavice proposed adapting the series into an animated cartoon, co-produced by Gaumont Television in 1994. Convinced by the series delivered in just ten months, Gaumont's general director, Patrice Ledoux, proposed in March 1995 that du Pontavice form his own department, Gaumont Multimédia, to produce cartoons, video games, and internet content. He moved to Luc Besson's former studios in Paris in September 1995, which years later became the headquarters of Xilam. Series such as Space Goofs, followed by Oggy and the Cockroaches, were a great success for the studio. Gaumont Multimédia also produced video games with adaptations of The Visitors in 1997 and The Fifth Element in 1998. He is also the first French producer to sell French cartoons to American television.

However, due to Gaumont's need for funds to develop its Multiplex cinema network, the reorientation of its main business, cinema, and an inability to develop diversification businesses at Gaumont, in addition to the death of his father Emmanuel on December 23 of that year, he left Gaumont on December 10 and was replaced by Stéphane Pathernay at the helm of Gaumont Multimédia on January 1, 1999, until the studio's closure that same year. On the same day as his replacement, du Pontavice announced the creation of an independent animation studio, which was introduced at MIPTV in May 1999. On August 5, 1999, he founded the animation studio Xilam, where the studio's name is an anagram of M-Alix, a declaration of love for his wife, Alix de Maistre, and in December of the same year, Gaumont sold the assets of the former Gaumont Multimédia to du Pontavice for 44 million francs and reintegrated it into Xilam. Also in 1999, he signed a contract with Dargaud and Lucky Comics to purchase the animation rights to Lucky Luke, producing The New Adventures of Lucky Luke for France 3 in 2001 with a budget of €18.4 million.

On April 8, 2009, du Pontavice was elected president of the French Animation Producers Union (currently known as AnimFrance), after having served as vice-president of the union. He held the position until 2015, when he was succeeded by Philippe Alessandri.

On February 3, 2020, along with 19 shareholders, he bought the longest-running film magazine in France, Cahiers du Cinéma, which resulted in the magazine's editorial team resigning collectively after the purchase. In the same year, he was invited by the Academy of Motion Picture Arts and Sciences to become a member of the academy. He was also elected for the animation division of the new leadership of the Academy of Cinema Arts and Techniques, responsible for the César Awards ceremony, which elected 42 representatives, following the controversy at the 45th César Awards involving director Roman Polanski.

On March 10, 2022, he released his autobiographical book, Destin animé, published by Slatkine et Compagnie, which tells the story of his life as a producer and the history of the Xilam studio. Development of the book began in mid-September 2020 during the COVID-19 pandemic, when the book's publisher offered du Pontavice the opportunity to tell his story in an autobiographical book, described by him as interesting and particularly praised for the final chapter on I Lost My Body, in which he described the film's creation as the point where much of his personal and professional history crystallized, as well as passing on his story to his and de Maistre's children, Lou and Ivan du Pontavice, and his colleagues.

In 2026, he was included in The Hollywood Reporter's inaugural Animation Power List for redefining the medium of animation.

== Personal life ==
Du Pontavice has been married to director and screenwriter Alix de Maistre since June 23, 1989, with whom he had dated five years since 1984, during their student years, which they have spent hours debating cinema. They have two children, Lou and Ivan. Du Pontavice and de Maistre married in the former French commune of Saint-Martin-du-Mesnil-Oury in Calvados.

The couple's relationship is very loving, as they form a united and fused couple, where de Maistre's love protects du Pontavice, also due to her support, both emotional and intellectual, which is one of the conditions for his balance. Without her, his choices would not always be the same. The birth of their children, Lou in 1992 and Ivan in 1995, brought rebirth to Marc, who faced sexual abuse from his mother in childhood. He has a good relationship with his two children, and also forms a strong bond with his eldest daughter. As for his youngest son, he sees him as a wonderful boy and sees himself reflected as in a mirror. Du Pontavice and de Maistre have been living in Vincennes since 1996. On du Pontavice's 50th birthday in 2013, de Maistre made a moving speech, uttered an essential phrase which said all the strength of her gaze upon him: "Marc, you are not afraid."

Unlike his mother Anne de Pardieu, with whom he had a strained relationship due to the sexual abuse he suffered at her hands as a child, du Pontavice had a good relationship with his father Emmanuel. In his childhood, his father loved to tell him and his siblings the story of the young Spartan whose liver was devoured by a fox hidden under his cloak, and who preferred to endure this torment in silence rather than reveal what he had done. Du Pontavice's father always loved women, right up to the last one he loved. He saw his father as a great intellectual and scholar, even though he didn't care about his producer career, but constantly congratulated him on his romantic happiness with de Maistre. In December 1999, around the time the library of the former Gaumont Multimédia was being acquired for integration into Xilam, du Pontavice, de Maistre and the couple's two children traveled to China to celebrate the New Year with his brother. Du Pontavice and de Maistre's eldest daughter, Lou, returned to the country 19 years later to shoot her film The Watchman in 2018, which was originally a short film project for INSAS from Belgium.

He is a fan of recent animation such as Studio Ghibli's The Tale of the Princess Kaguya and The Wind Rises, and Disney's Wander Over Yonder, and also admires Brad Bird, Bluey and the comics of Joann Sfar, who worked alongside him on Gainsbourg: A Heroic Life, directed by Sfar himself. He is not a fan of Cinar's Papa Beaver's Storytime, as the series exasperates him, due to the literary model prevalent in French animation at the time.

Du Pontavice is fluent in English and German, the latter due to his time at boarding school near Bonn during his adolescence, whereas the first one was previously terrible for having chosen German as his first foreign language.

During Xilam's financial crisis between 2011 and 2012, du Pontavice suffered from severe bouts of respiratory allergies that left him exhausted and his digestive system was not faring well. He was diagnosed with micro-polyps and an ulcer that had healed without him even noticing.

He criticized France Télévisions' decision to close France 4 in an interview with the newspaper Le Figaro in 2018, calling it "a profound mistake." In a letter published in the newspaper Le Monde on February 10, 2020, du Pontavice, along with fellow film industry figures who also signed the letter, resigned en masse from the board of the Academy of Cinema Arts and Techniques in response to the state of the César Awards, specifically the nominations received by Roman Polanski that year, which were not mentioned in the letter, and called for a reform of the leadership structures. In a column sent to Agence France-Presse in the same year, about one hundred representatives, including du Pontavice and the director of I Lost My Body, Jérémy Clapin, who make up the new general assembly of the Academy of Cinema Arts and Techniques that holds the César ceremony, ruled out a collective resignation and denounced the lack of transparency following the presence of Polanski among the members. In his 2024 interview with Cartoon Brew, he also criticized streaming platforms for missing the mark with their original children's content, noting that they fail to give new properties enough time to build a fan base. He also said that there are no territories reserved for live-action, just as there are no territories reserved for animation, since any story can be told through animation. Regarding the use of animation to address adult, sophisticated and important themes, he said that animation makes it possible to tell any type of story and that it is an art form to consider when it comes to shedding light on various issues. In a debate in the French Senate on January 7, 2026, regarding the difficulties in animation, he publicly criticized the proliferation of expensive and unregulated private institutions, which he called "ephemeral schools" (pop-up schools), for not guaranteeing the insertion of young animators into the job market, and advocated for more rigorous certification standards, aiming to protect students and preserve the quality of France's talent pool. In an opinion piece for the magazine Le Film français on July 8 of the same year, du Pontavice argued that everyone should consider the contribution that animation can make to the future of cinema and give it the place it deserves.

On the topic of artificial intelligence, du Pontavice said that AI will never reproduce any story or style and it shouldn't be viewed as a means to revolutionize the processes behind animation. Despite not seeing AI as a threat, he and Xilam try to focus on and go exactly where AI can't go and said AI is impossible to come up with animated content. In Submarine Jim, du Pontavice commented that the artist's hand can be felt, and that it wasn't the focus at the time, but they are going where AI has difficulty keeping up. He said that his film, Lucy Lost, is a response to the fear of artificial intelligence in animation, given that it is a feature film that is absolutely impossible to create using AI, both technically and artistically and that artificial intelligence is incapable of venturing into this territory.

== Influences ==
Du Pontavice was intrigued by Charlie Chaplin, Buster Keaton, Fatty Arbuckle, Harold Lloyd, Tex Avery, Chuck Jones, but also Walt Disney's 1967 The Jungle Book, the Mandrake the Magician and Rahan comics and the paintings of Alexander Iakovlev.

== Filmography ==
=== Film ===
Year	Title	Role	Notes
1990	Koko Flanel		Special thanks
2003	De nouveau lundi		Short film
2003	Kaena: The Prophecy		
2007	Go West! A Lucky Luke Adventure		
2007	Sleeping Betty		Short film
2009	For a Son	Doctor	Script collaboration with Alix de Maistre and Jean-François Henry
2010	Gainsbourg: A Heroic Life	Police Officer Vian 1	
2011	War of the Buttons		
2013	Oggy and the Cockroaches: The Movie		
2014	Far from Men		
2015	Minions		Special thanks
2016	Lucky Luke : la fabrique du western européen	Himself	
2017	Chateau		Co-producer
2018	Close Enemies		
2019	I Lost My Body		
2024	Meanwhile on Earth		
2024	Prodigies		
2025	La Vie de château - Mon enfance à Versailles		Co-producer
2026	Lucy Lost		
2027	The Wolf		

=== Television ===
Year	Title	Notes
1992–1995	Highlander: The Series	Executive in charge of production, alongside Denis Leroy seasons 1–3 only
1994–1996	Highlander: The Animated Series	
1996	Sky Dancers	
1996–1997	Dragon Flyz	
1997–2006	Space Goofs	
1998–1999	The Magician	
1999–present	Oggy and the Cockroaches	Freelance producer on season 2
2001–2003	The New Adventures of Lucky Luke	
2001–2002	Cartouche: Prince of the Streets	
2003–2004	Ratz	
2005	Tupu	
2006–2007	Shuriken School	Co-produced with José Maria Castillejo
2006–2007	Rintindumb	
2008–2018	A Kind of Magic	
2008–2009	Rahan	
2009–2010	Mr. Baby	Creator
2010–2016	The Daltons	
2010–present	Zig & Sharko	
2011–2014	Floopaloo, Where Are You?	Creator
2013–2015	Hubert & Takako	
2016–2017	Rolling with the Ronks!	
2017–2019	Paprika	
2018	If I Were an Animal...	Creator
2019–2023	Mr. Magoo	
2020	Moka's Fabulous Adventures!	
2020	Coach Me If You Can	
2021–present	Lupin's Tales	
2021–2024	Chip 'n' Dale: Park Life	
2021–2023	Oggy Oggy	
2021	Oggy and the Cockroaches: Next Generation	
2021–2022	The Adventures of Bernie	
2023	Karate Sheep	
2023	Kaeloo	
2023	Silly Sundays	Special thanks
2024	Buddybot	Theme song writer
2024	My Life in Versailles	Co-producer
2025–present	Piggy Builders	
2026–present	Submarine Jim	
2026–present	The Doomies	

=== Video games ===
Year	Title
1998	Les Visiteurs, le jeu
1998	The Fifth Element
2000	Stupid Invaders

== Honours and awards ==
=== Honours ===
- Chevalier, ordre national du Mérite (2014)

=== Awards ===
Year	Association	Category	Nominee	Result
2010	International Encounters of Heritage Cinema and Restored Films	Henri-Langlois Award		Won
2011	César Awards	Best Film	Gainsbourg: A Heroic Life	Nominated
2011	César Awards	Best First Film	Gainsbourg: A Heroic Life	Won
2019	Annecy International Animation Film Festival	Mifa Animation Industry Award		Won
2020	Academy Awards	Academy Award for Best Animated Feature	I Lost My Body	Nominated
2020	César Awards	Best Animated Film	I Lost My Body	Won
2020	César Awards	Daniel Toscan du Plantier Award		Nominated
2020	Animation Magazine Hall of Fame	Game-Changer Award		Won

== Bibliography ==
- Pontavice, Marc du. Destin animé. France: Slatkine et Compagnie, 2022; ISBN 9782889441914
