= Oggy and the Cockroaches =

French animated comedy series

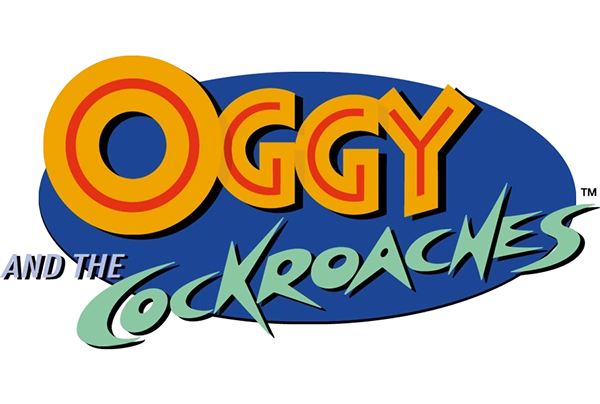
- French: Oggy et les Cafards
- Genre: Slapstick comedy
- Created by: Jean-Yves Raimbaud
- Directed by: Olivier Jean-Marie
- Voices of: Hugues Le Bars (seasons 1–4); Michel Elias ("Chatter Box")
- Music by: Hervé Lavandier (seasons 1–2); Hugues Le Bars (seasons 1–4); Vincent Artaud (seasons 5–present)
- Countries of origin: France; Canada (season 2)
- Original language: Gibberish
- No. of seasons: 8
- No. of episodes: 182 (list of episodes)

Production
- Executive producers: Marc du Pontavice; Paul Cadieux (season 2)
- Producers: Marc du Pontavice; Aziza Ghalila (seasons 1–2)
- Editors: Florence Poli (season 1); Rodolphe Ploquin (seasons 1–2); David Sauve (season 2); Patrick Ducruet (seasons 3, 6–7); Fanny Bensussan (seasons 3–4); Lou Bouniol (season 4); Laure Charossuett (seasons 5–7)
- Running time: 21 minutes (6–14 minutes per segment)
- Production companies: Gaumont Multimedia (season 1); Xilam Animation (seasons 2–present) (Note: Animation outsourced to Big Star Enterprise (seasons 1–2), Armada TMT (seasons 3–7), Neon Pumpkin Animation Studios (season 3), Digital eMation, Inc. (season 3), Dong Woo Animation (season 4), Morph Animation (seasons 5–7), and philmCGI (seasons 6–7).); Tooncan (season 2)

Original release
- Network: France 3 (seasons 1–2); Canal+ Family (seasons 3–4); Gulli (seasons 5–8); Netflix (season 8; Worldwide); France Télévisions (seasons 9-present)
- Release: 6 September 1999 – present

Related
- Oggy and the Cockroaches: The Movie; Oggy Oggy; Oggy and the Cockroaches: Next Generation

Oggy and the Cockroaches (French: Oggy et les Cafards) is an animated television series created by Jean-Yves Raimbaud and produced by Gaumont Multimedia for season 1 and Xilam Animation for seasons 2–8 (in co-production with Les Productions Coquerelles for season 2). It chronicles the comedic exploits and burlesque adventures of a rotund, blue cat named Oggy, whose days are always ruined by three cockroaches – Joey, Marky, and Dee Dee respectively – who regularly cause mischief at his home. The show employs the use of silent comedy, with characters not speaking and using unintelligible gibberish vocalizations, gestures, facial expressions, sound effects and sardonic laughter to communicate. Complex sequences (presenting a scene or context) are illustrated with images, sometimes in written text, speech balloons, or pictograms. In India, however, the series is notably aired on some television channels with voice-acted dialogue in Hindi and other languages.

The series premiered in September 1999 on France 3, and was licensed internationally in over 190 territories. It ended in January 2019, having released seven seasons and 169 half-hour episodes (501 seven-to-fourteen-minute segments) in over two decades to date. The cartoon relies on slapstick humour, much like its inspiration Tom and Jerry; although traditional slapstick cartoon characters prefer dropping anvils and pianos on each other, Oggy and the Cockroaches sometimes uses atomic bombs or submarines.

In September 2020, an eighth season, which acted as a reboot series, was announced, entitled Oggy and the Cockroaches: Next Generation, in which Oggy takes care of Piya, a young elephant from India. It was released worldwide on Netflix on 28 July 2022. In 2021, a spin-off, Oggy Oggy, was released, focusing on the adventures of a kitten version of Oggy without the cockroaches. On 10 March 2026, it was announced that a ninth season was in production and it is slated to be released sometime around late 2027 to early 2028, making it one of the longest running series in the world, at 28 years.

== Premise ==
Oggy, an anthropomorphic cat, spends his days watching television, lounging around, and eating, but is continually pestered and annoyed by three cockroaches (Joey, Marky, and Dee Dee) in his house, whose endgoal is to obtain absolute control of Oggy's house through any means. The roaches' slapstick mischief ranges from mostly plundering Oggy's refrigerator, to hijacking the train he just boarded. In many situations, Oggy is also helped by his cousin, Jack, who is more violent and short-tempered than him and is also annoyed by the cockroaches. Other recurring characters include Bob, Oggy's short-tempered bulldog neighbor; and Olivia, a female cat who becomes Oggy's love interest.

The fifth season loosely utilises ideas from Oggy and the Cockroaches: The Movie which covers the adventures of Oggy, cockroaches, Jack, Bob and Olivia throughout various time periods. In no particular order, each series has a topic, based on an important place and time in history (e.g. Episode 1 covers Ancient Egypt and Episode 5 covers the Middle Ages) or a story with historical significance (e.g. Episode 23 focuses on the Greek epic poem Odyssey by Homer and Episode 26 focuses on the legend of King Arthur).

== Episodes ==
Season	Segments	Episodes	Originally released		
Season	Segments	Episodes	First released	Last released	Network
1	78	26	September 6, 1999	February 11, 2000	France 3
2	78	26	September 4, 2000	April 5, 2003	France 3
3	39	13	October 18, 2008	December 24, 2008	Canal+ Family
4	74	26	January 2, 2012	December 12, 2013	Canal+ Family
Film			August 7, 2013		Canal+ Family
5	76	26	June 30, 2017	July 30, 2018	Gulli
6	78	26	May 16, 2017	August 3, 2018	Gulli
7	78	26	March 19, 2018	January 30, 2019	Gulli
Next Generation	78	13	July 28, 2022		Netflix

== Characters ==
All notable characters as they appeared in the fourth season

=== Main ===
- Oggy is a placid, solitary, and unlucky light blue cat. When he is not dealing with the cockroaches, he usually spends his time at home, watching TV, doing housework, gardening, cooking, eating, or trying to woo over Olivia. He is very passionate about food, and is quite sentimental and easily sympathizes with creatures in distress. Oggy has a love–hate relationship with the cockroaches, having lived with them for a long time. When he finds himself alone in his house, he begins to miss the roaches along with their pranks. According to executive producer Marc du Pontavice and France Info, Oggy was named after punk rock musician Iggy Pop, and the rock album The Rise and Fall of Ziggy Stardust and the Spiders from Mars (1972).
- The Cockroaches are a trio of cockroaches who love antagonizing, playing tricks on, harassing, tormenting and mangling Oggy and Jack and using extreme measures to put an end to them, and indulge in their passionately destructive mayhem without visible remorse. The cockroaches are named after the members of the Ramones.
  - Joey is a short, aggressive purple and pink cockroach. Even though he is the shortest in the group, he is the leader, and the most intelligent, always being the brains for their plans – but is sometimes rejected and forced to go alone, because Marky and Dee Dee often think that his ideas are stupid. He also loves money, but his efforts always fall short, usually ending with him getting swatted or beaten up. He often drags his friends into shady dealings, hatching plans to serve his goals or to get himself out of a sticky situation, and has a bit of a dictator mentality. He is named after Joey Ramone.
  - Marky is a tall, green and grey cockroach. Although he originally used to love mischief, pranks and annoying Oggy in pretty much every possible way (just like Dee Dee and Joey), he has grown to be more laid-back as the series progressed. He sometimes is a hopeless romantic-type (as seen in "Jealousy" and "Baby Doll"/"Doll Idol"), his hobbies consist of dating puppets, parties and reading. He is named after Marky Ramone.
  - Dee Dee is the youngest orange and dark-blue cockroach. He is always hungry, and his gluttonous appetite often reaches outrageous proportions, often resulting in the consumption of larger animals or other things that would otherwise be inedible. He is named after Dee Dee Ramone.

=== Supporting ===
- Jack is a green cat who is Oggy's cousin. In contrast to Oggy, he is more short-tempered, violent and arrogant than him. He can be seen as greedy, shown in a few episodes where he goes against or teams up with Oggy for money, or satiating his own pathological egomania. He often finds himself inventing and building huge machinery, such as roach-catching contraptions. He is also fond of boisterous activities: war games, skiing, and powerful machines. He is also very enterprising, self-assured, prideful and doesn't hesitate to show off his own delusions of grandeur. Despite his differing personality causing him and Oggy to sometimes clash and quarrel, they have a loving relationship, and Jack is willing to help his cousin out any way he can, while also simply enjoying hanging out with him.
- Bob is an unfriendly, large brown bulldog who enjoys quiet and refined hobbies (gardening and ballet). He has a knack for being in the wrong place at the wrong time, which often makes him the victim of numerous mishaps throughout the show and leads him to react rather brutally. When Oggy, Jack or the cockroaches accidentally irritate him (crushing him, shaving his fur and destroying his home), he usually pummels Oggy or Jack offscreen, invariably emerging victorious from his battles. Despite this, depending on the circumstances, he can be an ally of Oggy and Jack; he gets along fairly well with them and Olivia in seasons 4 and 5.
- Olivia is a white cat who first appears in the fourth season as Oggy's love interest, having settled in a house near him, Jack and Bob. She is happy-go-lucky and polite, being fond of nature and finding any sort of opportunity for fun. In spite of her outlook, she is aware of the cockroaches' mischief, so she sometimes stops them when they are around by using aggressive methods. However, she is also friends with the cockroaches. In one episode, Olivia and Oggy marry. However, their life after said marriage is not frequently shown later in the series.

=== Other ===
- Oggy's Grandma is a blue cat and Oggy's grandmother. In "Granny's Day", she decides to actually kill the roaches, but eventually spares the cockroaches at the end after seeing Dee Dee's despair with the situation. She is then attacked by them in "Oggy's Grandma", once getting her head flattened by the lid of Oggy's toilet.
- Monica is Oggy's twin sister and Jack's love interest, the latter of whom she has a child with in "Don't Rock the Cradle!"/"Oggy the Babysitter". She debuted in the season 2 episode "Love & Kisses", where she accidentally kisses Jack and he falls in love with her. Jack's attempts to propose to Monica are always stopped by the cockroaches' pranks.
- Lady K is a light-yellow female cockroach who debuted in the episode of the same name as the cockroaches' new love interest (mainly Joey's) – to which she takes advantage of. K frequently attempts to use the cockroaches as her pawns to get what she wants or her job done.
- Pit is a gray dog living in the same neighborhood as Oggy, who debuted in the fourth season. Like Bob, he is also strong.
- Bobette is Bob's daughter who debuted in the fifth season. She is Jack's love interest, as seen in the episodes "Marky's Tournament" (where Marky also had a crush on her) and "Jackromeo and Bobette". She is seen in the episode "Emperor for a Day" as Napoleon's love interest.
- The Policeman is an unnamed human policeman who is normally seen in traffic, or sometimes wherever Oggy has traveled to. Sometimes Oggy or Jack accidentally annoy him, due to the cockroaches' mischief.
- The Doctor is an unnamed human doctor who sometimes visits Oggy's house when Oggy gets sick, or in other cases, when another character (like Jack) assumes Oggy has gone mad. He sometimes wears a nurse's outfit.
- The Witch is an unnamed female human witch who has a black coat, dress and magic hat who appears as a minor character in several seasons 3 and 4 episodes, like the episode "Inside Out", in which her magical telescope falls into Oggy's house, and also in "The Magic Pen" (in which her magical pencil falls into Oggy's house yard) and "Back to the Past!" (in which she turns Oggy, Jack and Bob into babies after the cockroaches blame them accidentally destroying her hat on them). She is bald, has gray hair and always lives with an attitude. In season 7, the witch gets a redesign, which reuses Miss Cleo the Witch Impersonator's design from Space Goofs.
- Oggy's Ex-Girlfriend is an unnamed human female character who debuted in the season 1 episode "Jealousy" and was Oggy's first love before Olivia. She is shown to be dating another guy in the episode "Oggy's Night Out"/"What's on the Menu?"; however, she briefly gets back together with Oggy in the season 2 episode "The Joker Joked".

Some of the characters cameo in Xilam's other series, such as Zig & Sharko and The Daltons (in Joe's dream in "The Secret Passage" and a cameo in "Fort Dalton"), and in the film Go West! A Lucky Luke Adventure (2007). The eponymous characters make their debut in the Space Goofs episode "Venus Junior", where they are seen on the aliens' television (before the pilot episode was officially posted online, in 2016). In the second season, the episode "Space Sailors" has a gag where the roaches greet Etno (in the aliens' now-flooded house) as they row by. Oggy, the roaches and Jack appear as drawings in "Doodle", Oggy can be seen on a page of a book during "Madame Zelza", a minor character (a large, fat woman with a bobcut) and her pet poodle appear in the episode "Get Off My Couch!". and Oggy and Monica make a cameo in the episode "The Alien Show".

== Production ==
In March 1997, Marc du Pontavice needed to find something at least as surprising, yet without trying to compete with the radical nature of Space Goofs, which was set to premiere in September. He recalled his old passions and turned to American slapstick, the chase cartoon. Du Pontavice decided to pick up where the Americans had left off in the 1970s and launch Gaumont Multimédia into the adventure of chase cartoons. He approached Jean-Yves Raimbaud to conceive the next series based on a simple brief: what would a Tom and Jerry-style series look like in the year 2000? The show was meant to counter the surge of superheroes, manga and Franco-Belgian comic book heroes. Raimbaud received the request without much enthusiasm, as he had always felt more at home with the style of the Fleischer Brothers than that of Tex Avery or Hanna-Barbera. However, he was delighted by the success of his show Space Goofs and willingly accepted the challenge, even though du Pontavice could tell he viewed it merely as a work-for-hire assignment. Raimbaud returned three weeks later with two drawings. One depicted a standing cat with a cheerful expression and a handwritten note: "My name is Oggy." Oggy owes his first name to Iggy Pop, as well as the character of Ziggy Stardust created by David Bowie. The other showed the same cat chasing three cockroaches, to which he had given the names of the Ramones: Joey, Dee Dee, and Marky. At du Pontavice's request, Raimbaud added another character, Jack; this would allow for a wider range of situations and, above all, highlight Oggy's gentle nature through contrast. Du Pontavice recognized the power of the concept, which lay in its obvious simplicity. Raimbaud hadn't simply swapped the mouse for cockroaches; he had inverted the dynamic of the conflict. It was the cockroaches who provoked Oggy, not the other way around. Oggy, for his part, remained fundamentally good-natured.

When du Pontavice presented the first draft to Marie-Line Petrequin, his German partner at ProSieben, she was not only enthusiastic but also encouraged him to take the slapstick comedy concept to its logical conclusion and make the leap to silent film. The brief he had given Jean-Yves Raimbaud to create a chase-style cartoon naturally pointed in that direction. Since Raimbaud wasn't particularly interested in directing the series, du Pontavice turned to Thomas Szabó, the director of the first season of Space Goofs, but he, too, was unenthusiastic. Although Szabó is a master of absurdist comedy, he dreams more of live-action science fiction; animation is a last resort for him. Furthermore, directing a silent film frustrated his love for dialogue and the role it plays in comedic timing. He agreed to storyboard a three-minute pilot, which du Pontavice needed to convince the other partners. However, du Pontavice's enthusiasm waned when he read the storyboard. Szabó questioned the choice of a dialogue-free format. That was when du Pontavice realized the difficulty of the task ahead. He had no idea who could take on such a challenge and guide the teams down the radical path and time was running out, as it was already late May and he absolutely needed the pilot ready for MIPCOM in October.

That was when Olivier Jean-Marie, who would go on to become Xilam's key pillar of the studio for years, stepped onto the scene. He had served as animation director for Space Goofs, a role to which he had been appointed by Bob Jaques and Kelly Armstrong. Marc du Pontavice consulted him because, at that juncture, he needed an animator's perspective. After some initial hesitation, as he was reluctant to critique the work of Thomas Szabó, who had been his own director, Jean-Marie finally took the plunge; he literally cast aside the existing storyboard in favor of a vision that left du Pontavice astounded and confirmed his decision to pursue a dialogue-free approach. He told du Pontavice exactly what he was longing to hear, proposing a radically different directorial style. To wrap up his presentation, Jean-Marie suggested that du Pontavice entrust the storyboard to him, promising to return with a completely new proposal. A few days later, he came back with his version of the storyboard. The virtuosity of the camera movements, combined with hilarious poses and purely farcical situations, deeply impressed du Pontavice. Art director Jean Journaux introduced vibrant and pop-style tones and an interplay between wallpaper patterns and props that created a unique aesthetic. However, another issue weighed on their minds: the soundtrack. They realized that, in the absence of dialogue, the music would have to play a genuine narrative role. It would frequently need to embody both the comedy and the energy of the episode. They needed to craft the music in perfect sync with the visuals and they would no longer simply make skillful edits of pre-recorded tracks from their composers; instead, they had to work on the music and especially its rhythm, in the closest possible alignment with the imagery. And since they wanted a style that differed somewhat from Space Goofs, Olivier Jean-Marie turned to Hugues Le Bars, whom he had discovered through the theater world. Hervé Lavandier came up with the idea of using the harpsichord to accompany the cockroaches, while Le Bars composed the show's theme song.

At the start of Space Goofs, Marc du Pontavice was determined not to repeat the mistakes made with Highlander: The Animated Series, yet he feared failing to achieve the desired outcome. He needed a tool that would allow him to maintain control over the entire production process and, above all, over image quality. Consequently, when Jean-Louis Rizet approached him in 1996 with a new software program he was developing, one that enabled digital control of the entire image-finishing process, including coloring and compositing, du Pontavice offered him a contract covering three series. The sum was more than enough to fund the development of his software, Toutenkartoon, which became a cornerstone of French animation for the next two decades. However, du Pontavice attached a condition to this venture, which the development had to align with the studio's production methods, and the software's structure had to be based on the "exposure sheet", a series of A3 pages, each containing 30 lines, with one line per frame. The animation service for the series' first two seasons was provided by the South Korean studio Big Star Enterprise, a location Marc du Pontavice visited frequently. Jean-Marie entrusted the animation of Oggy to Jean-Christophe Dessaint. Although a recent graduate at the time, he had already mastered the conventions of animation. The budget reached 61 million francs per minute. Oggy and the Cockroaches was presented at MIPCOM in October, a year after Space Goofs had premiered there. The pilot episode was screened and proved successful. The partners behind Space Goofs responded enthusiastically to Oggy; Fox and ProSieben doubled their investment in the show. After the death of Jean-Yves Raimbaud, Olivier Jean-Marie, the director of the series, decided not to modify the design of Oggy, in particular his blue color. The first season cost 70 million francs to produce, with production costs subsequently decreasing in later seasons.

The issue of female representation in the series during the early seasons was seen as very stereotypical, which the Xilam studio considered disturbing due to some countries' opposition to it. It only improved in recent seasons with the introduction of Oggy's girlfriend-turned-wife, Olivia, in the fourth season, who is a strong and charismatic woman. When asked about his favorite episode, Marc du Pontavice said it's the last one he worked on for the show.

After the second season, a third and fourth season were commissioned later, in 2007 and 2011 respectively, following the first two seasons' meteoric rise to international success. Additional characters were introduced, octopuses and fish, whilst the setting and main characters received updates and changes to their background, designs, voices, sounds, facial expressions, and soundtracks. After a four-year gap in production, season 5 was released in mid-2017 with two more seasons coming later. Season 6 episodes began airing on K2, while Season 5 was previewed on Gulli. Due to Le Bars' passing, some new audio for Oggy and the cockroach trio was recorded for seasons 5–7 – the voice actor currently remains unknown.

As the show began to grow increasingly popular in India, du Pontavice and his team were very keen on the idea of setting an episode there. However, they were concerned about telling an inappropriate story that might fail to do justice to the setting or fall into clichés, as it felt strange to them to create content of this nature from a studio in Paris. They decided to send the series director, Olivier Jean-Marie, to India for a week or two, where he could seek inspiration and try to avoid stereotypes. Since Jean-Marie was a natural-born traveler, this provided a opportunity for the production team to craft an episode that would resonate with an Indian audience. For the most part, they avoided specific cultural contexts, as the series was designed to be universal, which was all the more reason for them to be cautious and invest time in researching India. The series is also made possible with the help of Vietnamese animation studio, Armada TMT, in the role of animation outsourcer.

Oggy and the Cockroaches was produced with the participation of Le centre national de la cinématographie (seasons 1–3, 5–7), France 3 (seasons 1–2), ProSieben (season 1), TPS Cinéma (season 2), Telefilm Canada (season 2), Gouvernement du Québec (season 2), Programme de credit d'impôt (season 2), The Government of Canada (season 2), Canadian Film or Video Production Tax Credit Program (season 2), France Télévisions (season 4), Canal+ (season 4), Télétoon+ (season 4) Gulli (seasons 5–7), Canal J (seasons 5–7), and Cartoon Network (seasons 5–7), in association with Canal+ (season 3), Cofanim-Backup Films (seasons 3–4), Sofitvciné 4 (seasons 5–7), A Plus Image 7 (seasons 5–7), Indéfilms 5 (seasons 5–7), and Cofinova 13 (seasons 5–7), and the support of the MEDIA Programme of the European Union (season 3), CNC (season 4), Sofitvcine 4 (seasons 5–7), A Plus Image 7 (seasons 5–7), Indéfilms 5 (seasons 5–7), Cofinova 13 (seasons 5–7), and Pôle Image Magelis (seasons 6–7).

=== Music ===
Throughout the first four seasons, Hugues Le Bars composes the series' music. Hervé Lavandier, the composer of Space Goofs, only composed the music for the first and second seasons. Starting with the fifth season, Vincent Artaud, who was a composer on other Xilam titles like the second through fourth seasons of Zig & Sharko, Hubert & Takako, and FloopaLoo, Where Are You?, replaced Le Bars as the composer for the show. Some of the music composed by Artaud are rearranged versions of the score from Oggy and the Cockroaches: The Movie.

== Broadcast ==
Oggy and the Cockroaches originated from France, and the series originally aired on France 3 through the network's Les Minikeums block (seasons 1 and 2 with reruns of seasons 3 and 4), Canal+ Family (seasons 3 and 4), and Gulli (seasons 5 to 7, who also reran older episodes from November 2005 to 2010 on the GRRR!!!, GulliGulli, GulliGang and GulliGood blocks), being key to the channel's successful launch and one of its most popular shows, with reruns airing on other French networks like Canal J, Canal+, Télétoon+, France 4, Boomerang and TiJi. The series is watched by over 800 million households worldwide via linear TV and SVOD platforms, such as Netflix and Amazon Prime Video.

In the Philippines, the series aired on TV5 in 2010, and ABS-CBN from 2010 to 2020. In late 2011, it was welcomed to Cartoon Network's line-up and adored by the channel, and aired until 2022 due to the said show being one of the network's top-viewed programs. It moved to GMA Network on 3 September 2022, under the network's Astig Authority Saturday morning block.

In Southeast Asia, season 3 of the series was broadcast on Disney Channel and Disney XD from 2009 to 31 December 2013. Seasons 1 to 5 were broadcast on the local Cartoon Network from late 2010 to 2017, and seasons 4 to 7 from 2017 to 2022. Seasons 1 to 4 were broadcast on Nickelodeon from 2015 to April 2021.

In Arabian countries, it aired on Ajyal TV, MBC3, and Basma Channel. It also airs on 2M in Morocco, local Tunisian channels (i.e. Tunis 7), Saudi 2 in Saudi Arabia, Dubai One in the United Arab Emirates, and Gulli Arabic.

In Italy, it was broadcast on Italia 1, Hiro, Boing, K2, Frisbee, DeA Kids, and Mediaset (in K2 and Frisbee, it also has a growing consumer products range across all major categories, including toys).

It also aired in India from 2009 to 2012 on Nickelodeon. There, it was notably given voice-acted dialogue in various languages. On 16 July 2012, the series was acquired by Cartoon Network, which broadcast a Telugu audio track of the show featuring dialogue, a narrator, Bollywood-style references, and character localization, airing it hours each day until its fourth season. In 2015, Nickelodeon started rebroadcasting the show's older episodes, from seasons 1 to 3. Later, on 21 October of the same year, the series was also picked up by Nickelodeon Sonic, which broadcast the same seasons as Nick. Season 5 started airing on Cartoon Network from 14 August 2017. Seasons 3, 6 and 7 aired later during 2018–19, on Cartoon Network India. In August 2020, Sonic Nickelodeon started airing Hindi, Kannada and Tamil audio track of season 4 again. Cartoon Network aired seasons 5 to 7 until March 2022. In October 2021, Sony YAY! took over the rights for all seven seasons.

In the United States, it aired on Fox Kids from 12 September 1998 to 5 March 1999. Nickelodeon began airing the series on 23 February 2015 until March of that same year. The show later aired on KidsClick from 2018 until the block's discontinuation in 2019; it notably aired on the block as its final program.

In the United Kingdom, in August 2008, Galleon Ent., a U.K.-based intellectual property owner and developer of family entertainment properties, signed an agreement to represent all licensing rights to children's properties A Kind of Magic, Oggy and the Cockroaches and Rahan: Son of the Dark Age.

In Latin America and Brazil, in April 2019, Ecuadorian public broadcaster TC Ecuador picked up Zig & Sharko, A Kind of Magic, and seasons 3 to 7 of Oggy and the Cockroaches. The trio of shows launched on the channel over the coming year. The deal expanded Xilam's rapidly growing presence in Latin America, where the studio's first preschool series, Paprika, premiered last October on Disney Junior across the region. It also aired on Cartoon Network, Tooncast and Boomerang in the countries.

It has also aired on Kids Channel in Mauritius, Pop, Nicktoons, CITV and RTÉ One in the United Kingdom and Ireland, Boomerang and ABC3 in Australia, MTV Sub, Nelonen and MTV Oy in Finland, Markíza in Slovakia, Tring Tring and Vizion Plus in Albania, ProSieben Maxx, CineStar, Super RTL and Disney Channel in Germany (the latter also in Austria and Switzerland), TV3 (the latter also in Latvia), NTV7 and Awesome TV in Malaysia, PLUSPLUS in Ukraine, SIC in Portugal, LNK in Lithuania, Citytv in Colombia, YTV in Canada, Spacetoon Indonesia in Indonesia, ProSieben, RTL 7 in the Netherlands, Barnkanalen in Sweden, Federalna televizija in Bosnia and Herzegovina, IRIB TV2 and IRIB Nahal in Iran, ARB Günəş in Azerbaijan, Pop in Slovenia, Nova Fun in the Czech Republic, Arutz HaYeladim and Noga in Israel, Kanal 2 in Estonia, TVB in Hong Kong, Smile TV and Alter Channel in Greece, Fantastic in Poland, TPH Club and K3 in Spain, Kohavision in Kosovo, ABC Kids in Australia, RTBF and VRT in Belgium, UYoung in China, VIAPLAY in the Baltic states, Carousel in Russia, and TC Ecuador in Ecuador.

=== Distribution ===
On 24 October 2014, the official YouTube channel for Oggy and the Cockroaches was created, with all of the episodes – in a high-quality, widescreen format – from seasons 1 to 7. The channel had also made various compilations and episodes with English title cards. As of November 2026, the channel had 14 million subscribers, making it one of the top 10 most-subscribed French channels on the site. As of December 2025, "The Magic Pen" ("Crayon Magique") (the 14th episode of the fourth season) was the most-viewed episode on the official channel, with over 183 million views. The most-viewed compilation had 121 million views.

From 2017, the series netted over two billion YouTube views each year, in addition to boasting 3.8 million fans and followers on Facebook by 2019, Instagram, Pinterest, etc.

== Media ==
=== Home media ===
Five DVDs came out in 2003 in the United States, with 12 episodes each. In 2005, several VHSs were released in New York City.

On 8 October 2008, a French DVD box set of the complete first season, plus the pilot and the episode "Working Cat", was released. On 6 September 2010, three French DVD box sets of the complete first, second, and third seasons were made available. In July 2011, a French DVD box set containing all episodes from seasons 1, 2 and 3 became available. Seasons 4 to 7 are yet to be available. Multiple VHSs were sold in Italy.

#	DVD name	Release date
1	Volume 1	4 November 2003
2	Volume 2	4 November 2003
3	Volume 3	25 November 2003
4	Volume 4	25 November 2003
5	Volume 5	25 November 2003

=== Magazine ===
A magazine called Oggy et les Cafards, le mag came out in France in 2009 (two issues), then again in 2011.

- n°1: 11 July 2009
- n°2: 21 October 2009
- n°3: 14 January 2011

=== Music ===
A music album titled Oggy et les Cafards: Le Show du Chat was released in France on CD and for digital download on 6 September 2010 under the Sony Music Entertainment label.

2010 : Oggy et les Cafards : Le Show du Chat (Sony Music Entertainment)
No.	Title	Length
1.	"Générique Oggy et les Cafards"	0:39
2.	"Gaga des Gags d'Oggy"	2:48
3.	"Interlude « Le Réveil d'Oggy »"	0:19
4.	"Matez le Matou"	2:19
5.	"Interlude « Un Chat Bien Botté »"	0:21
6.	"Love Cats"	3:20
7.	"Interlude « Jack, un Ami qui vous Veut du Bien »"	0:22
8.	"Jack le Pote"	2:11
9.	"Interlude « Cafard-naüm »"	0:19
10.	"Oggy Rossini"	3:45
11.	"Interlude « Le Chat Volant »"	0:20
12.	"Dans l'Œil du Chat"	4:58
13.	"Interlude « Cat's Woman »"	0:20
14.	"Pussycat"	3:31
15.	"Interlude « Blues Cat »"	0:24
16.	"Oggy le Chat Chou"	1:53
17.	"Interlude « Cafards à la Playa »"	0:52
18.	"Le Ragga d'Oggy"	2:54
19.	"Générique Oggy et les Cafards"	0:42
20.	"Oggy Never Falls in Love (Bonus in dematerialised version)"	3:36

=== Comics ===
A French comic series adapted from the series first started out in 2010. It is published by Dargaud, written by Diego Aranega, and drawn and colourised by Frévin, also known as Sylvain Frécon. Aranega was awarded the Bulle d'Or for his work on the series in 2011.

- 16 April 2010: Plouf, prouf, vrooo !
- 5 November 2010: Crac, boum, miaouuuuu !
- 23 September 2011: Bip...bip...bip...

An American comic was planned to be released in summer 2019. The first issue was released on 11 December 2019, after being delayed two times. It is published by American Mythology Productions. The comic was released on a bi-monthly schedule, but was on a hiatus for four months after two issues were published due to the COVID-19 pandemic's effect on the comic book industry. Issue #3 was published on 24 June 2020. It is currently on hiatus as of 23 October 2020.

=== CD drama ===
A CD drama, Oggy et les Cafards Volume 1, was released in France on CD and for digital download in October 2012. It contains narrations of five episodes by Anthony Kavanagh.

2012 : Oggy et les Cafards Volume 1 (Sony Music Entertainment)
No.	Title	Length
1.	"Oggywood"	5:15
2.	"Tribulations en Chine"	10:26
3.	"Le Train Complètement Fou"	7:51
4.	"Papa Poule"	8:41
5.	"37°2 Toute la Journée"	5:45

=== Film ===
The film Oggy and the Cockroaches: The Movie (originally Oggy et les Cafards, Le Film) was announced in 2012, and released to theatres on 7 August 2013. This feature film has four segments, prehistoric era "Oggy Magnon", Middle Ages "Prince Oggy II", 19th-century London "Jack Holmes", and futuristic "Oggy-Wan Kenoggy", the latter of which is a CGI segment.

=== Cancelled video game ===
A video game adaptation for the Game Boy Advance based on the television show was announced in 2004 and planned and developed by Xilam. The game was present at E3 2004, where footage was shown as it being a 2D platformer, and it was scheduled for release months later in Q3 2004, but the game was cancelled and never materialized for unknown reasons.

=== Spin-off ===
Oggy Oggy, which centers on a kitten version of Oggy, free from the tyrannical mayhem of the roaches, was released on 24 August 2021. It is CG-animated. The series was launched during Xilam's second Virtual Showcase event for TV channel and platform commissioners and buyers, which ran from 7 to 9 April 2021, and on Netflix in August 2021, and is the first French Netflix original series.

=== Reboot ===
Like the original series, it focuses on the wacky antics of Oggy and the trio of mischievous cockroaches that inhabit his house. This reboot also has Oggy taking care of Piya, a young, seven-year-old elephant from India who is the daughter of Oggy's Indian friends, whom he is looking after during their holiday.

=== Statue ===
In 18 December 2019, to commemorate the series' 20th anniversary, the characters were included in the Musée Grévin. The statue unveiling ceremony was attended by the series' producer, Marc du Pontavice, who had actually visited the museum as a child.

=== Merchandise ===
Oggy and the Cockroaches products, such as plush toys, clothing, furniture, board games, luggage, flip-flops, sneakers, slippers, underwear, leisurewear, sleepwear, puzzles, educational games, card games, notebooks, diaries, address books, notebooks, labels, timetables, binders, organizers, and exercise books, among other items, have been marketed by such companies such as Corner Design, the Royer Group, Blues Filobranca, TF1 Games, and the Hamelin Group.

In 2015, Xilam launched the first of several waves of collectible Oggy and the Cockroaches figurines in a partnership with licensing agent Discovery initially and Gedis Newsstand in Italy, with more than 800,000 units sold as of 2016. The figures, produced by Grani Partners for Gedis, are so popular that a fourth collection was developed for April 2018.

In 2018, Xilam appointed Lansay as master toy partner for the series. Lansay produced and distributed an initial line of traditional plushes, electronic plushes, a full line of 3D plastic figures, and board and card games at retail in France in the first quarter of 2018, following the relaunch of the show on Gulli.

=== Apps ===
In 2017, Xilam released a new app in conjunction with the series. The game invites fans to enjoy a wild race between the titular character and his rival cockroaches Joey, Dee Dee and Marky, as they try to empty Oggy's fridge. The app was designed in-house by Xilam Animation and developed by mobile publishing company Playsoft. The free game features in-app purchases offering bonus levels, such as increases in speed and hover-boards, 3 different worlds to explore and super powers, series-accurate graphics, obstacles and projectiles to avoid, coins to collect and increase Oggy's skills, and the chance to challenge friends on Facebook. By 2017, the app had already racked up more than 1.5 million downloads, and 9,000 reviews with an average rating of 4.1 stars out of 5.

The brand's various apps boast over 20 million downloads as of 2019.

== Controversy ==
The series' run on Nickelodeon in the United States was short-lived; it entered a brief controversy during a broadcast on the network on 5 March 2015, when the network aired "(Un)Happy Camper!", an episode in which the appearance of a framed portrait of a topless woman was seen in the background of a brief shot in Oggy's trailer during the scene where he enters it after Joey switches oil and water signs. However, the series aired in a 3:30 P.M. ET/PT timeslot on the American Nickelodeon network, before most school-age children got home from school, so the incident did not gain mainstream media attention. Faced with the anger of parents and complaints from many viewers, Nickelodeon quickly intervened; the episode was quickly removed from its website and rotation on its television network. The series continued to air on Nickelodeon in that timeslot until it was quietly removed, before all of the season’s episodes were aired. It also aired on sister network Nicktoons until it too was removed from the schedule by May of the same year, likely solely for contractual purposes due to Nickelodeon's worldwide deal for the series, which requires an airing on its American networks. Both the network and Xilam declined to comment.

All later releases of the episode, from airings worldwide to the official Oggy channel on YouTube, replace the picture with a beach scene.

== Reception and legacy ==
The show holds a cult classic status in India as well as in many South and Southeast Asian countries. In India, the show featured Hindi language dubbing for the main characters, which resembled the voices of famous Hindi film industry actors such as Shah Rukh Khan, Sunny Deol, Akshay Kumar, Paresh Rawal, Arshad Warsi and Suniel Shetty. Emily Ashby of Common Sense Media gave the show 2/5 stars, saying that the show "lays up slapstick comedy and physical violence among its mutually contentious characters to get laughs".

According to a 2018 Kantar TNS study on cartoon popularity, Oggy and the Cockroaches is known by 69% of all French people and, with 30% of the global population, is the most popular children's program among French households with children, ahead of Totally Spies! (28%) and Rabbids Invasion (27%).

As of 2021, the series had generated €100 million in revenue since its inception.

== See also ==
- Pakdam Pakdai, a 2013 Indian animated series based around a dog and three mice by Nikhil Vyas
- List of French animated television series
- List of French television series
