= The Daltons (2010 TV series) =

French comedy series

- Genre: Western; Comedy
- Created by: Olivier Jean-Marie
- Based on: The Daltons (Lucky Luke) by Morris and René Goscinny
- Developed by: Olivier Jean-Marie; Jean-François Henry
- Directed by: Charles Vaucelle
- Theme music composer: Arrogant Criminals
- Opening theme: "Boys Get Around", performed by Arrogant Criminals
- Composer: Hervé Lavandier
- Country of origin: France
- Original language: French
- No. of series: 2
- No. of episodes: 191

Production
- Executive producer: Marc du Pontavice
- Producer: Marc du Pontavice
- Production companies: Xilam; Lucky Comics; Dargaud Media; B Media Kids

Original release
- Network: Canal+ Family
- Release: 31 May 2010 – 18 November 2016

The Daltons (French: Les Dalton) is a French children's comedy animated television series based on the works by artist Morris and writer René Goscinny, focusing on the four main villains of the comic book series Lucky Luke who try to escape the prison as they get locked up in every time Lucky Luke captures them. The show was adapted by Olivier Jean-Marie and Jean-François Henry and directed by Charles Vaucelle.

== Plot ==
Prisoners of a penitentiary in the Nevada desert, the Dalton brothers try to escape from the penitentiary but without achieving their ends.

== Characters ==
=== Main ===
- Joe Dalton – Joe is the oldest, shortest, angriest and evilest of the Dalton brothers who is always planning a way to escape prison, but his plans usually fail. His tremendous anger stems from his hatred of Lucky Luke due to him putting them in prison multiple times.
- Jack Dalton – Jack is the first middle of the Dalton brothers. He is quite withdrawn, attentive and calm; we discover him as a mechanical genius.
- William Dalton – William is the most intelligent and cultured of the Dalton brothers. He is quite thoughtful and calm, he is also the one who solves even the most complex problems, he is even able to translate ancient texts like Nahuatl (the language of the Aztecs) and he is close to Jack.
- Averell Dalton – Averell is the tallest, youngest, and dumbest of the Dalton brothers (which is a common cause of escape failures). He is sensitive and honest in spite of himself. He is very often in the moon. He is also a great foodie, however he sometimes has strokes of genius or shows himself to be very talented in certain fields (especially art), such as making trompe-l'oeil, making origami or sculptures. with just about anything: stones, soap, food.
- Melvin Peabody – Melvin is the warden of the penitentiary (although most of the decisions are made by Miss Betty). He closely monitors the actions of the Dalton brothers. He is also fairly self-assured, greedy, impulsive, and he panics quite easily when the Daltons try to escape. He also has a soft spot for Miss Betty. He dreams of his penitentiary becoming famous and holding onto its reputation. It sometimes receives famous people like Thomas Edison, the Wright Brothers, Queen Victoria, Ulysses S. Grant, the Dr. Jekyll (renamed Dr. Jeffkyll), Jesse James, Charles Darwin, Henri de Toulouse-Lautrec, Antonio López de Santa Anna, etc. It also has a language twitch and replaces most suffixes with "tude", in the English dub, he has a language twitch and replaces most suffixes with an "-ism". In the episode "Lady Bandit", he tells the new prisoner to call him George while in actuality his name is Melvin.
- Miss Betty – Betty is the prison host. The majority of inmates have a soft spot for her, as do Mr. Peabody and Fabulous Falcon. She has her character and at the same time gentle and caring. She has a crush on Averell Dalton as admitted by her in the episode "Feris Wheel Daltons". She turns out to be very skilled with anything: firearm, bow and arrow, driving, etc.
- Rantanplan/Rintindumb – Rantanplan is the penitentiary's dimwitted watchdog. He is the only animal in the show who can talk (to us at least). He seems to have a surge of affection for the Daltons and in particular Joe, whom he sees as a master at some times. He is primarily responsible for the failures in the Daltons' escapes. It is shown in the episode "The Contrary of an Indian" that he understands the opposite of what he is told, and in the episode "Inside Rintindumb" that his stupidity is due to the inactivity of his brain capacities.

=== Recurring ===
- Pete and Emett – They are the two guards at the penitentiary. They are close and not very smart. They often make bets on whether the Daltons are able to escape or not and spend more time chatting than watching them.
- Crazy Wolf – He is the chief of the Bras-Cassés tribe. He is the one who most often brings the Dalton back to the penitentiary, often with arrows in the back. Despite his appearance and calm voice, he is very touchy and impulsive.
- Fabulous Falcon – a born manipulator and crook who is often fooled by the Daltons who steal personal and even magical objects from him, which can help them escape, even if he maintains a certain collaboration with them. Like Miss Betty, he educates and sells his Native products at the penitentiary where he presents Native American customs and culture. He is also a sorcerer and doctor.
- Ma Dalton – Ma Dalton is the Dalton's mother. She is similar in height to Joe's (whereas in the comics she is a little taller than him). Despite her dishonesty, she attaches great importance to the politeness and good education of her children, whom she loves, especially Averell.
- Ming Lee Fu – He is the Chinese penitentiary launderer. He is gifted in acupuncture, hypnosis, kung fu, etc. He lives in a pagoda which also serves as a laundry. He also has boxes of explosives that he uses to unclog the washing machine, or fireworks for Chinese New Year.
- Lucky Luke – Lucky Luke is a lone cowboy who shoots faster than his shadow and the hero of the series of the same name who kept stopping the Daltons, much to Joe's dismay. Although he is absent from this series, he appears in the blink of an eye in some episodes. According to Mr. Peabody in the episode "Jailbreak for Dummies", he would have retired but note that in this same episode, Joe was furious to see him (it was Peabody disguised as Lucky Luke) because it would seem let him be responsible for their incarceration in the penitentiary.

== Cast ==
The series was produced in French with the addition of four different English dubs being made; one for Paris, one for Los Angeles, one for New York, and one for the Philippines (the latter dub currently being used for streaming platforms).

Character name	French voice actor	English dubbing actor			
Character name	French voice actor	Miroslav Pilon Studios (Paris)	Jim Gomez Productions (Los Angeles)	Distribimage (New York)	SDI Media (Philippines)
Joe Dalton	Christophe Lemoine	Matthew Géczy	John Mariano	Marc Thompson	Zahn Yu
Jack Dalton	Bruno Fender	David Gasman	Barry Dennen	Tom Wayland	Earl Palma
William Dalton	Julien Cafaro	David Gasman	Brian Cummings	Tom Wayland	Pol Yu
Averell Dalton	Bernard Alane	Mike Powers	Maurice LaMarche	Marc Thompson	John Clyde
Melvin Peabody	Stéphane Ronchewski	David Gasman	Barry Dennen	Darren Dunstan	Jose Manuel Torres
Rintindumb	François Morel	Mike Powers	Maurice LaMarche	Darren Dunstan	Joe William Kerr
Miss Betty	Edwige Lemoine	Sharon Mann	E. G. Daily	Eileen Stevens	Bianca Arambulo
Emett	Michel Dodane	Matthew Géczy	Rob Paulsen	Darren Dunstan	Jacob Garcia
Pete	Bruno Magne	David Gasman	Danny Mann	Marc Thompson	John Santiago
Fabulous Falcon	Jérémy Prévost	Matthew Géczy	Unknown	Darren Dunstan	Mark Guzman
Crazy Wolf	Bruno Magne	David Gasman	Jim Gomez	N/A	Angelo Cruz

== Episodes ==
=== Series overview ===
Season	Episodes	Originally released	
Season	Episodes	First released	Last released
1	78	May 31, 2010	October 5, 2012
2	113	April 29, 2013	November 18, 2016

=== Season 1 (2010–12) ===
No. overall	No. in season	Title	Written by	Storyboard by	Original release date
1	1	"Bubbles" "Ça bulle pour les Dalton"	Olivier Jean-Marie	Charles Vaucelle	31 May 2010
2	2	"Twister" "Les Dalton twistés"	Charles Vaucelle & Yves Coulon	Stéphane Annette	7 June 2010
3	3	"Mind VS Body" "Esprit es-tu là?"	Michel Coulon	Jean Cayrol	8 June 2010
4	4	"Stormy Weather" "Le rideau d'eau"	Olivier Jean-Marie	Laurnet Jennet	9 June 2010
5	5	"Dogsitting" "Le toutou des Dalton"	Olivier Jean-Marie	Frédéric Mintoff	10 June 2010
6	6	"Dots and Stripes" "Une affaire de goût"	Jean-Marc Lenglen	Vincent Dubost	11 June 2010
7	7	"Hostage Havoc" "Crise d'otages"	Jean-Marc Lenglen	Alexandre Viano	14 June 2010
8	8	"Last Will" "Dernières volontés"	Yves Coulon	Alexandre Viano	3 July 2010
9	9	"Hand Off My Rocks" "Touche pas à mes diams"	Yves Coulon	Matthieu Pitschon	7 August 2010
10	10	"The Daltons Go Climbing" "Les Dalton atteignent des sommets"	Olivier Jean-Marie	Laurnet Jennet	6 September 2010
11	11	"The Director's Girlfriend" "La fiancée du directeur"	Yves Coulon	Laurnet Jennet	7 September 2010
12	12	"The Informer" "Le mouchard"	Jean-Marc Lenglen	Frédéric Mintoff	8 September 2010
13	13	"Tunnel Trouble" "Galères en galeries"	Jean-Marc Lenglen	Frédéric Mintoff	9 September 2010
14	14	"The Magician" "Le magicien"	Jean-Marc Lenglen	Laurnet Jennet	10 September 2010
15	15	"Totem Pole Daltons" "Les Dalton en totem"	Olivier Jean-Marie	Andres Fernandez	13 September 2010
16	16	"Zzzzzzzzz..."	Olivier Jean-Marie	Andres Fernandez	14 September 2010
17	17	"Mamma Mia!" "Mamma mia!"	Jean-Marc Lenglen	Andres Fernandez	15 September 2010
18	18	"Joe Playboy" "Joli cœur"	Jean-Marc Lenglen	Vincent Dubost	16 September 2010
19	19	"The Daltons Play Rugby" "Les Dalton en mêlée"	Olivier Jean-Marie	Stéphane Annette	17 September 2010
20	20	"The Daltons Go Snow Crazy" "Les Dalton à la neige"	Jean-Marc Lenglen	Vincent Dubost	11 October 2010
21	21	"Too Many Tunnels" "Le trou de trop"	Jean-François Henry	Launret Jennet	18 October 2010
22	22	"The Daltons go Cleaning" "Les Dalton font du propre"	Jean-Marc Lenglen	Matthieu Pitschon	25 October 2010
23	23	"Crazy Firecrackers" "La poudre d'escampette"	Michel Coulon	Matthieu Pitschon	1 November 2010
24	24	"Locked Outside" "Enfermés dehors"	Olivier Jean-Marie	Frédéric Mintoff	29 November 2010
25	25	"Free at Last" "Enfin libre!"	Jean-Marc Lenglen	Andres Fernandez	3 January 2011
26	26	"The Fakir" "Le fakir"	Olivier Jean-Marie	Alexandre Viano & Laurnet Jennet	7 February 2011
27	27	"The Daltons Afloat" "Les Dalton à l'eau"	Olivier Jean-Marie	Frédéric Mintoff	14 February 2011
28	28	"The Desert of Death That Kills" "Le désert de la mort qui tue"	Olivier Jean-Marie	Andres Fernandez	21 March 2011
29	29	"Nitroglycerine Nightmare" "Et que ça saute!"	Jean-Marc Lenglen	Matthieu Pitschon	28 March 2011
30	30	"Invisible Daltons" "Les Dalton disparaissent"	Yves Coulon	Vincent Dubost	11 April 2011
31	31	"Camera Scam" "Les Dalton font leur cinéma"	Patrick Regnard & Michel Haillard	Céline Goblinet	22 April 2011
32	32	"Jailbreak for Dummies" "L'évasion pour les nuls"	Yves Coulon	Stéphane Annette	23 May 2011
33	33	"The Wager" "Le pari"	Michel Coulon	Frédéric Mintoff	29 May 2011
34	34	"Up Up and Away" "Gonflés!"	Olivier Jean-Marie	Stéphane Annette	27 June 2011
35	35	"Signed, Stamped and Delivered" "Les Dalton timbrés"	Olivier Jean-Marie	Matthieu Pitschon	18 July 2011
36	36	"Oil Leak" "Les Dalton carburent"	Olivier Jean-Marie	Matthieu Pitschon	25 July 2011
37	37	"Smoke Without Fire" "Ça va fumer"	Michel Coulon	Matthieu Pitschon	1 August 2011
38	38	"The Daltons Go Time Travelling" "Les Dalton remettent les pendules à l'heure"	Patrick Regnard & Michel Haillard	Andres Fernandez	26 September 2011
39	39	"Buffalo Bluff" "Bisons futés"	Olivier Jean-Marie	Stéphane Annette	3 October 2011
40	40	"Prison Sickness" "Le Mal du pénitencier"	Jean-Marc Lenglen	Stéphane Annette	7 October 2011
41	41	"Freewheel Daltons" "Les Dalton en roue libre"	Jean-Marc Lenglen	Andres Fernandez	10 October 2011
42	42	"The Flint Daltons" "Les Dalton tombent sur un os"	Olivier Jean-Marie	Frédéric Mintoff	14 October 2011
43	43	"The New Warden" "Joe le dirlo"	Yves Coulon	Stéphane Annette	17 October 2011
44	44	"The Great Green Escape" "Les Dalton dans la jungle"	Yves Coulon	Stéphane Annette	18 October 2011
45	45	"Loony Daltons" "Ils sont fous ces Dalton"	Olivier Jean-Marie	Vincent Dubost	19 October 2011
46	46	"The Daltons Christmas" "Un Noël pour les Dalton"	Yves Coulon	Andres Fernandez	20 October 2011
47	47	"The Daltons Go Babysitting" "Les Dalton pouponnent"	Michel Coulon	Andres Fernandez	21 November 2011
48	48	"The Daltons Fan" "Fan des Dalton"	Yves Coulon	Andres Fernandez	5 December 2011
49	49	"The Dalton Code" "Le code Dalton"	Olivier Jean-Marie	Stéphane Annette	12 December 2011
50	50	"Chain of Misfortune" "Le maillon faible"	Michel Coulon	Matthieu Pitschon	20 January 2012
51	51	"Joe the Ostrich Man" "Joe fait l'autruche"	Olivier Jean-Marie	Andres Fernandez	6 February 2012
52	52	"The Daltons Aloft" "Les Dalton prennent l'air"	Yves Coulon	Matthieu Pitschon	5 March 2012
53	53	"The Daltons Get Recycled" "Les Dalton à la poubelle"	Olivier Jean-Marie	Stéphane Annette	6 March 2012
54	54	"Magnetic Joe" "Magnetic Joe"	Yves Coulon	Stéphane Annette	7 March 2012
55	55	"Cowed" "La vache et les prisonniers"	Michel Coulon	Matthieu Pitschon	8 March 2012
56	56	"Sleepwalkers Escape" "Averell, tu dors?"	Michel Coulon	Matthieu Pitschon	9 March 2012
57	57	"The Daltons Go Baking" "Les Dalton dans la farine"	Olivier Jean-Marie	Stéphane Annette	9 April 2012
58	58	"The Two Minutes Stop" "2 minutes d'arrêt"	Yves Coulon	Alexandre Viano	14 May 2012
59	59	"The Lady Bandit" "La prisonnière"	Olivier Jean-Marie	Andres Fernandez	25 June 2012
60	60	"The Daltons Rodeo" "Rodéo pour les Dalton"	Michel Coulon	Jean Cayrol	9 July 2012
61	61	"The Daltons Go Electric" "Les Dalton se mettent au courant"	Yves Coulon	Matthieu Pitschon	27 August 2012
62	62	"Dr. Jeffkyll and Mr. Averell" "Bête et méchant"	Michel Coulon	Andres Fernandez	3 September 2012
63	63	"Dalton Land" "Daltonland"	Olivier Jean-Marie	Vincent Fouache	4 September 2012
64	64	"The Prophesy" "Le devin"	Michel Coulon	Jean-Luc Abiven	5 September 2012
65	65	"Big and Not Bright" "Une solide amitié"	Michel Coulon	Matthieu Pitschon	6 September 2012
66	66	"Goofy Golf" "18 trous pour 4 Dalton"	Yves Coulon & Charles Vaucelle	Matthieu Pitschon	7 September 2012
67	67	"The Secret Passage" "Le passage secret"	Yves Coulon	Jean Cayrol	10 September 2012
Note: This has cameos from Xilam's Space Goofs and Oggy and the Cockroaches.
68	68	"New Faces for the Daltons" "Les Dalton se refont une beauté"	Yves Coulon & Charles Vaucelle	Céline Gobinet	11 September 2012
69	69	"Sceptical Sorcerer" "Le serment des Dalton"	Yves Coulon	Yann Provost	12 September 2012
70	70	"Reincarnation" "La réincarnation"	Jean-François Henry	Launret Jennet	13 September 2012
71	71	"Morse Code" "Joe le funambule"	Olivier Jean-Marie	Céline Gobinet	14 September 2012
72	72	"Trompe l'oeil" "Trompe-l'œil"	Yves Coulon	Andres Fernandez	17 September 2012
73	73	"The Daltons on High" "Le vol de trop"	Vincent Bonjour	Jean-Luc Abiven	18 September 2012
74	74	"Jungle Jinx" "Le fils de la jungle"	Michel Coulon	Matthieu Pitschon	19 September 2012
75	75	"Not Exactly Aztec" "Les Dalton font le mur"	Charles Vaucelle & Yves Coulon	Matthieu Pitschon	20 September 2012
76	76	"UFO Goofs" "Un ovni pour les Dalton"	Charles Vaucelle & Yves Coulon	Matthieu Pitschon	21 September 2012
77	77	"The Daltons Go Wrestling" "Les rois du ring"	Charles Vaucelle & Yves Coulon	Andres Fernandez	1 October 2012
78	78	"Chicken Soup" "Le coup du poulet"	Yves Coulon	Matthieu Pitschon	5 October 2012

=== Season 2 (2013–16) ===
No. overall	No. in season	Title	Written by	Storyboard by	Original release date
79	1	"The Art of Being Dalton" "L'art d'être un Dalton"	Sébastien Guérout	Yoshimichi Tamura	29 April 2013
80	2	"The Scent of Freedom" "Parfum d'évasion"	Jean-Marc Lenglen	Lionel Brousse	6 May 2013
81	3	"The Masked Avenger" "Le justicier masqué"	Michel Coulon	Matthieu Pitschon	13 May 2013
82	4	"Evil Jenny" "Jenny La Terreur"	Nicolas Gallet	Yoshimichi Tamura	20 May 2013
83	5	"Size Wise" "Un problème de taille"	Jean-Marc Lenglen	Lionel Brousse	27 May 2013
84	6	"Zoo Break" "Une sacrée ménagerie !"	Sébastien Guérout	Cédric Lécer	3 June 2013
85	7	"What a Ball" "Boulets et boulettes"	Jean-Marc Lenglen	Yoshimichi Tamura	10 June 2013
86	8	"Gigi the Giraffe" "Le coup de la girafe"	Yves Coulon	Lionel Brousse	17 June 2013
87	9	"The Jailbird's Genie" "Coup de génie"	Marie Eynard & Armand Robin	Jean-Louis Champault	24 June 2013
88	10	"An Unnatural Catastrophe" "Catastrophe au pénitencier"	Jean-Marc Lenglen	Jean-Louis Champault	1 July 2013
89	11	"The Scene of the Crime" "En piste, les Dalton!"	Arnold Boiseau & Yves Coulon	Yoshimichi Tamura	8 July 2013
90	12	"The Daltons take Royal Leave" "Un plan royal !"	Nicolas Gallet	Lionel Brousse	26 August 2013
91	13	"The Walker through Walls" "Le passe-muraille"	Marie Eynard	Matthieu Pitschon	23 September 2013
92	14	"The Daltons Cousins" "Les cousines Dalton"	Jean-Charles Fink	Lionel Brousse	7 October 2013
93	15	"A Very Special Indian" "Le contraire d'un indien"	Jean-Charles Fink	Jean-Louis Champault	11 November 2013
94	16	"Wanted: Four Cute Boys" "Quatre beaux gosses pour une évasion"	Jean-Marc Lenglen	Lionel Brousse	9 December 2013
95	17	"The Two Winged Daltons" "Dalton avec deux ailes"	Yves Coulon	Matthieu Pitschon	14 January 2014
96	18	"The Daltons and the Beanstalk" "Roule ma poule !"	Michel Coulon	Lionel Brousse	25 February 2014
97	19	"Joe's Amnesia" "Trous de mémoire"	Hervé Nadler	Lionel Brousse	3 March 2014
98	20	"High on a Cactus" "Sur un cactus perché"	Nicolas Gallet	Jean-Louis Champault	4 March 2014
99	21	"The Daltons and the Web" "Les Dalton tissent leur toile"	Yves Coulon	Matthieu Pitschon	5 March 2014
100	22	"The Daltons Fury" "La fureur du Dalton"	Jean-Marc Lenglen	Thomas Astruc	6 March 2014
101	23	"Cactus Joe" "Cactus Joe"	Jean-Marc Lenglen	Lionel Brousse	7 March 2014
102	24	"The Voice of Freedom" "La voix est libre"	Sébastien Cuérout	Matthieu Pitschon	14 March 2014
103	25	"A Hairy Situation" "Les Dalton se font les cheveux"	Jean-Marc Lenglen	Jean-Louis Champault	25 April 2014
104	26	"The Daltons on Line" "Les Dalton surfent sur le réseau"	Yves Coulon	Matthieu Pitschon	5 May 2014
105	27	"The Daltons get Fit" "Les Dalton ont la forme"	Jean-Marc Lenglen	Jean-Louis Champault	9 June 2014
106	28	"Beauty and the Beasts" "La belle et les bêtes"	Jean-Marc Lenglen	Matthieu Pitschon	7 July 2014
107	29	"Highly Gifted Daltons" "Les Dalton sont surdoués"	Yves Coulon	Jean-Louis Champault	8 July 2014
108	30	"Inspection Time" "Inspecteur Dalton"	Charles Vaucelle & Yves Coulon	Matthieu Pitschon	9 July 2014
109	31	"The Daltons and the Ghost" "Ramon le fantôme"	Jean-Marc Lenglen	Lionel Brousse	10 July 2014
110	32	"A Piece of Cake" "C'est du gâteau"	Sébastien Guérout	Stéphane Annette	11 July 2014
111	33	"The Daltons Reality Show" "Les Dalton font de l'audimat"	Yves Coulon	Alexandre Ulmann	14 July 2014
112	34	"Firefighting Daltons" "Au feu les Dalton"	Jean-Marc Lenglen	Matthieu Pitschon	15 July 2014
113	35	"A Back Up Plan" "Mauvais plan"	Nicolas Gallet	Lionel Brousse	16 July 2014
114	36	"The Puppeteer" "Le marionnettiste"	Denis Lima & Yves Coulon	Stéphane Annette	17 July 2014
115	37	"The Ideal Dog" "Un mal de chien"	Michel Coulon	Lionel Brousse	18 July 2014
116	38	"Daltons are Moonstruck" "Les Dalton sont dans la lune"	Nicolas Gallet	Stéphane Annette	21 July 2014
117	39	"Multiple Joes" "Il voit des Joe partout"	Jean-Marc Lenglen	Stéphane Annette	22 July 2014
118	40	"Origami Time" "Les rois du pliage"	Renaud Phillips	Matthieu Pitschon	23 July 2014
119	41	"Who Kidnapped Rintindumb" "Raptarantanplan"	Jean-Marc Lenglen	Jean-Louis Champault	24 July 2014
120	42	"The Travel Box" "Les Dalton se téléportent"	Olivier Jean-Marie	Matthieu Pitschon	25 July 2014
121	43	"The Bread War" "La guerre du pain"	Yves Coulon	Lionel Brousse	28 July 2014
122	44	"Monkey Business" "Malin comme un singe"	Jean-Marc Lenglen	Lionel Brousse	29 July 2014
123	45	"Inside Rintindumb" "À l'intérieur de Rantanplan"	Yves Coulon	Stéphane Annette	30 July 2014
124	46	"Daltons Onstage" "Les Dalton entrent en scène"	Michel Coulon	Stéphane Annette	31 July 2014
125	47	"Daltons in Hardhats" "Les Dalton en chantier"	Jean-Marc Lenglen	Lionel Brousse	1 August 2014
126	48	"Daltons in a Kit" "Les Dalton en kit"	Yves Coulon	Stéphane Annette	4 August 2014
127	49	"Bouncing Daltons" "Les Dalton rebondissent"	Jean-Marc Lenglen	Stéphane Annette	26 September 2014
128	50	"Guards, Stop Those Daltons" "Gardes, arrêtez les Dalton !"	Renaud Phillips	Stéphane Annette	17 October 2014
129	51	"Giant" "C'est géant"	Nicolas Gallet	Matthieu Pitschon	14 November 2014
130	52	"Prince of the Desert" "Le prince du désert"	Jean-Marc Lenglen	Mickaël Mérigot	5 December 2014
131	53	"Funny Fangs Dalton" "Les Dalton ont les crocs"	Yves Coulon	Matthieu Pitschon	9 January 2015
132	54	"Service Station" "La station-service"	Jean-Marc Lenglen	Jean-Louis Champault	20 February 2015
133	55	"The Wand" "Coup de baguette"	Jean-Marc Lenglen	Stéphane Annette	27 March 2015
134	56	"Model Inmate" "Un prisonnier modèle"	Sébastien Guérout	Lionel Brousse	24 April 2015
135	57	"Gust of Wind" "Coup de vent"	Olivier Jean-Marie	Arthur Peltzer	29 May 2015
136	58	"Mommy Knows Best" "Maman, j'ai raté l'évasion"	Yves Coulon	Alexandre Viano	9 June 2015
137	59	"Super Averell" "Averell qui valait super cher"	Yves Coulon	Sylvain Ciault	3 July 2015
138	60	"An Indian Wedding" "Mariage à l'indienne"	Jean-Marc Lenglen	Stéphane Annette	27 July 2015
139	61	"All Hands on Deck" "À l'abordage !"	Jean-Marc Lenglen	Stéphane Annette	28 July 2015
140	62	"Daltons in the Movie" "Les Dalton crèvent l'écran"	Michel Coulon	Matthieu Pitschon	29 July 2015
141	63	"Penintentiary Palace Hotel" "Pénitencier palace hôtel"	Yves Coulon	Matthieu Pitschon	30 July 2015
142	64	"Marshmallow Trap" "Piège de guimauve"	Marie Eynard & Armand Robin	Pierre Cerutti	31 July 2015
143	65	"Good Old Joe" "Ce bon vieux Joe"	Jean-Marc Lenglen	Pierre Cerutti	7 August 2015
144	66	"Fries for Free" "Les Dalton ont la frite"	Yves Coulon	Matthieu Pitschon	14 August 2015
145	67	"Hell's Bells" "Un paradise d'enfer"	Nicolas Gallet	Arthur Peltzer	28 August 2015
146	68	"The Daltons Get Jabbed" "Les Dalton sont vaccinés"	Yves Coulon	Matthieu Pitschon	31 August 2015
147	69	"Brother Blow Your Horn" "Sonnez clairon !"	Emmanuel Leduc & Tom Leduc	Arthur Peltzer	1 September 2015
148	70	"Neanderthal Ninnies" "Un plan cro-mignon"	Jean-Christophe Hervé & Claude Perrin	Lionel Brousse	2 September 2015
149	71	"Suds for the Daltons" "Les Dalton se font mousser"	Hervé Nadler & Yves Coulon	Pierre Cerutti	3 September 2015
150	72	"Enemy Sisters" "Les sœurs ennemies"	Sébastien Guérout	Lionel Brousse	4 September 2015
151	73	"First Escape" "Première évasion"	Romain Canet & Clarie Espagno	Pierre Cerutti	5 October 2015
152	74	"Top Gear" "En quatrième vitesse"	Michel Coulon	Lionel Brousse	6 October 2015
153	75	"The Daltons and the Tortoise" "Les Dalton et la tortue"	Yves Coulon	Pierre Cerutti	7 October 2015
154	76	"Averell's Big Chill" "Averell jette un froid"	Philippe Clerc	Arthur Peltzer	8 October 2015
155	77	"Matador Daltons" "Corrida pour les Dalton"	Olivier Jean-Marie	Lionel Brousse	9 October 2015
156	78	"Daltons and Dragon" "Les Dalton et le Dragon"	Yves Coulon	Matthieu Pitschon	2 November 2015
157	79	"Gold Fingered Averell" "Averell aux doigts d'or"	Mattieu Choquet & Léonie de Rudder	Stéphane Annette	3 November 2015
158	80	"Coyote Brothers" "Frères coyotes"	Philippe Clerc	Lionel Brousse	4 November 2015
159	81	"Roll Up Daltons" "Les Dalton se plient en quatre"	Jean-Marc Lenglen	Pierre Cerutti	5 November 2015
160	82	"Dancing with Buffalo" "Danse avec les bisons"	Emmanuel Leduc & Tom Leduc	Matthieu Pitschon	25 November 2015
161	83	"The Fault Less Plan" "Le plan sans faille"	Jean-Christophe Hervé & Claude Perrin	Matthieu Pitschon	15 February 2016
162	84	"Ferris Wheel Daltons" "Les Dalton font la roue"	Olivier Jean-Marie	Lionel Brousse	14 March 2016
163	85	"Dalton Bunnies" "Les lapins Dalton"	Philippe Clerc	Stéphane Annette	25 April 2016
164	86	"Hysterical Daltons" "Les Dalton rient à pleines dents"	Jean-Marc Lenglen	Christof LeFébure	23 May 2016
165	87	"Yogi Daltons" "Mauvaises graines"	Nicolas Gallet	Christof LeFébure	29 May 2016
166	88	"Pick Pocketing Daltons" "C'est dans la poche"	Michel Coulon	Olivier Derynck	3 June 2016
167	89	"Deck Hand Daltons" "La croisière, ça m'use"	Yves Coulon	Stéphane Annette	9 June 2016
168	90	"Daltons on Cloud Nine" "Les Dalton sont sur un nuage"	Jean-Marc Lenglen	Olivier Derynck	29 July 2016
169	91	"Fort Dalton" "Fort Dalton"	Jean-Christophe Hervé & Claude Perrin	Stéphane Annette	29 August 2016
Note: This is a double-length episode. It also shows Candy from Space Goofs and Oggy from Oggy and the Cockroaches as cameos.
170	92	"You'll Be an Indian, My Son" "Tu seras un indien mon fils"	Jean-Christophe Hervé & Claude Perrin	Olivier Reynal	5 September 2016
171	93	"Carrier Pigeon Wanted" "Pigeon vole !"	Mattieu Choquet & Léonie de Rudder	Lionel Brousse	6 September 2016
172	94	"The Good Luck Charm" "Le porte-bonheur des Dalton"	Emmanuel Leduc & Tom Leduc	Lionel Brousse	7 September 2016
173	95	"The Daltons Hit the Headlines" "Les Dalton en première page"	Sébastien Guérout	Olivier Reynal	8 September 2016
174	96	"The Daltons at the Races" "Le dada des Dalton"	Charles Vaucelle & Yves Coulon	Pierre Cerutti	9 September 2016
175	97	"Miss Betty the Rebel" "Miss Betty se rebelle"	Clarie Espagno & Yves Coulon	Stéphane Annette	3 October 2016
176	98	"Teen Trouble" "Roulez jeunesse !"	Nicolas Gallet	Olivier Reynal	4 October 2016
177	99	"Bounty Hunter" "Le chasseur de primes"	Emmanuel Leduc & Marie Eynard	Matthieu Pitschon	5 October 2016
178	100	"Daltons on the Move" "Les Dalton déménagent"	Philippe Clerc	Olivier Reynal	6 October 2016
179	101	"Foreign Legion Daltons" "Les Dalton légionnaires"	Philippe Clerc	Mickaël Mérigot	7 October 2016
180	102	"Grandpa Dalton's Will" "Le testament de pépé Dalton"	Michel Coulon	Lionel Brousse	10 October 2016
181	103	"A Grain of Sand for the Daltons" "Un grain de sable pour les Dalton"	Clarie Espagno & Yves Coulon	Matthieu Pitschon	11 October 2016
182	104	"Shock Treatment" "Traitement de choc"	Mattieu Choquet & Léonie de Rudder	Mickaël Mérigot	12 October 2016
183	105	"The Dalton Fairy" "La fée Dalton"	Renaud Phillips	Mickaël Mérigot	13 October 2016
184	106	"Popcorn for the Daltons" "Du pop-corn pour les Dalton"	Jean-Marc Lenglen	Lionel Brousse	14 October 2016
185	107	"Daltons on Vacation" "Les vacances des Dalton"	Charles Vaucelle & Yves Coulon	Alexandre Viano	7 November 2016
Note: This is a double-length episode.
186	108	"Triple Idiot" "Triple Idiot !"	Michel Coulon	Matthieu Pitschon	8 November 2016
187	109	"Old Folks" "Reconstitution"	Jean-Christophe Hervé & Claude Perrin	Pierre Cerutti	9 November 2016
188	110	"The Stew Affliction" "Ragoût maudit"	Mattieu Choquet & Léonie de Rudder	Eric Cosselet	10 November 2016
189	111	"Inflatable Jail" "Les Dalton se ballonnent"	Clarie Espagno & Yves Coulon	Olivier Derynck	11 November 2016
190	112	"In the Air" "Au vol !"	Olivier Jean-Marie	Stéphane Annette	14 November 2016
191	113	"The Daltons Chill Out" "Au frais, les Dalton!"	Olivier Jean-Marie	Lionel Brousse	18 November 2016

== Broadcast ==
The series was released on May 31, 2010. It aired on France 3 and Canal+ Family, and then on Télétoon+, France 4 and Boomerang. In India, the show was broadcast on Nickelodeon Sonic, Hungama TV and Super Hungama in English, Hindi, Tamil and Telugu languages.
