= Loudworks =

Serbian dubbing studio

- Formerly: Imaginarijum (2016-2018)
- Type: Dubbing studio
- Industry: Media
- Predecessor: Voiceoffice
- Founded: 2000 in Belgrade, FR Yugoslavia
- Founder: Ratomir Kutlešić; Darko Obradović; Predrag Đorđević
- Defunct: 2018
- Successor: Oblakoder; Sinker Media
- Headquarters: Braće Jerkovića 117A, Belgrade, Serbia
- Areas served: Serbia; Montenegro; Bosnia & Herzegovina
- Products: Dubbings
- Owner: Ratomir Kutlešić (40%); Darko Obradović (30%); Predrag Đorđević (30%)

Loudworks (formerly called Imaginarijum) was a Serbian dubbing studio that dubbed animated and live-action television shows.

In 2018, Loudworks was shut down due to lawsuits against SBB, who sabotaged its former network channel. However, that year, all the famous actors in the studio were moved to the new studio Sinker Media with a new owner. Key members were moved 2 years later to the Oblakoder studio, but with new actors instead.

== Dubbing ==
The studio was founded in 2000 as a part of the Luxor company. In 2016, the name of the studio changed to Imaginarijum, but in 2018 it was changed back to Loudworks.

== Collaboration ==
=== TV channels ===
- (Serbia) Ultra
- (Serbia) Mini
- (Serbia) RTS 1
- (Serbia) RTS 2
- (Serbia) BK TV
- (Serbia) A1
- (Serbia) Naša TV
- (Serbia) Pink
- (Serbia) Pink 2
- (Serbia) Pink Super Kids
- (Serbia) Pink Kids
- (Serbia) Pikaboo
- (Serbia) RTV
- (Serbia) Happy Kids
- (Serbia) Studio B
- (Serbia) KCN Kopernikus
- (Serbia) Prva
- (Serbia) B92
- (Serbia) Kazbuka
- (Serbia) K1
- (Serbia) Dexy TV
- (Serbia) Delta
- (Serbia) Minimax
- (Bosnia and Herzegovina) OBN
- (Republika Srpska) RTRS
- (United States) Nickelodeon
- (United States) Nick Jr. Channel

=== Publishing houses ===
- A.S.F internacional
- BDR Media
- Gold Audio Video
- Dexy Co.
- Luxor
- Pro Vision
- Promaks film
- Sun promo
- Tisak
- Union Film

=== Companies ===
- The Walt Disney Company
- Warner Bros. Discovery
- Paramount Global

== Content ==
=== Animated and live-action series ===
- Angela Anaconda (Serbian: Anđela Anakonda)
- Angelina Ballerina: The Next Steps (Serbian: Anđelina Balerina)
- Atomic Betty (Serbian: Atomik Beti)
- The Backyardigans (Serbian: Društvance za dvorištvance)
- Barbie: Life in the Dreamhouse (Serbian: Barbi: Život u kući snova)
- Ben and Holly's Little Kingdom (Serbian: Ben i Holi)
- Bratz
- Chuggington (Serbian: Čagington)
- Johnny Test (Serbian: Džoni Test)
- Phineas and Ferb (Serbian: Fića i Feđa)
- Fifi and the Flowertots (Serbian: Fifi i cvetno društvo)
- Galactik Football (Serbian: Galaktički fudbal)
- Humf (Serbian: Hamf)
- Monster Buster Club (Serbian: Klub isterivača monstruma)
- Code Lyoko (Serbian: Kod Lioko)
- Code Lyoko: Evolution (Serbian: Kod Lioko: Evolucija)
- Growing Up Creepie (Serbian: Kripi)
- Lego Ninjago (Serbian: Nindžago)
- Lego Friends (Serbian: Lego prijatelji)
- LazyTown (Serbian: Lenji grad)
- Lilo & Stitch: The Series (Serbian: Lilo i Stič)
- Poppy Cat (Serbian: Maca Popi)
- A Kind of Magic (Serbian: Magična porodica)
- The Little Mermaid (Serbian: Mala sirena)
- Little-wolf (Serbian: Mali vuk)
- MÄR
- Masha and the Bear (Serbian: Maša i medved)
- Mia and Me (Serbian: Mia i ja)
- My Little Pony: Friendship Is Magic (Serbian: Moj mali poni)
- Me and My Monsters (Serbian: Moja čudovišta i ja)
- Naruto
- Peppa Pig (Serbian: Pepa Prase)
- Deltora Quest (Serbian: Potraga za Deltorom)
- Mermaid Melody (Serbian: Princeze sirene)
- Fleabag Monkeyface (Serbian: Stiki majmunoliki)
- TaleSpin (Serbian: Tejl spin)
- Totally Spies (Serbian: Super špijunke)
- Tickety Toc
- In the Night Garden... (Serbian: U noćnoj bašti)
- Skip Beat (Serbian: U ritmu srca)
- Winx Club (Serbian: Vinks klub)
- Farmkids (Serbian: Životinjska farma)
- Kaeloo (Serbian: Žlabac)

=== Animated and live-action films ===
- Aladdin (Serbian:Atlantida, izgubljeno carstvo)
- Cars (Serbian: Automobili)
- Brother Bear (Serbian: Brat medved)
- A Bug's Life (Serbian: Bubice, velika avantura)
- Monsters, Inc. (Serbian: Čudovište iz ormara)
- Dinosaur (Serbian: Dinosaurus)
- Chicken Little (Serbian: Dosije pilence)
- Hercules (Serbian: Herkules)
- The Incredibles (Serbian: Neviđeni)
- The Jungle Book 2 (Serbian: Knjiga o džungli 2)
- Lilo & Stitch (Serbian: Lilo i Stič)
- Ratatouille (Serbian: Mućkalica)
- Balto
- Mulan
- Mulan 2
- Return to Never Land (Serbian: Peter Pan 2: Povratak u Nedođiju)
- Treasure Planet (Serbian: Planeta s blagom)
- Home on the Range (Serbian: Pobuna na farmi)
- Pocahontas (Serbian: Pokahontas)
- Toy Story (Serbian: Priča o igračkama)
- Toy Story 2 (Serbian: Priča o igračkama 2)
- A Goofy Movie (Serbian: Šiljin film)
- Tarzan
- Finding Nemo (Serbian: U potrazi za Nemo)
- The Hunchback of Notre Dame (Serbian: Zvonar Bogorodičine crkve)

== Staff ==
=== Voice actors in dubbing ===
- Aleksa Petrović
- Aleksa Stanilović
- Aleksandar Arsić
- Aleksandar Radojčić
- Aleksandra Bijelić
- Aleksandra Cucić
- Aleksandra Đurić
- Aleksandra Mladenović
- Aleksandra Ristović
- Aleksandra Širkić
- Aleksandra Tomić
- Ana Davidović Vajnberg
- Ana Marković
- Ana Milenković
- Ana Popović
- Anja Abramović
- Andrej Rašeta
- Andrijana Oliverić
- Anka Gaćeša
- Bojan Lazarov
- Bojan Žirović
- Bojana Stefanović
- Bora Nenić
- Borka Tomović
- Branislav Platiša
- Branislav Zeremski
- Čarni Đerić
- Danica Todorović
- Danijel Sič
- Darko Tomović
- Dejan Dedić
- Dejan Lutkić
- Doris Radić
- Dragana Milošević
- Dragana Kaucki
- Dragana Zrnić
- Dubravko Jovanović
- Dunja Đorđević
- Dušica Novaković
- Duško Premović
- Đorđe Marković
- Goran Jevtić
- Goran Popović
- Goran Balančević
- Igor Borojević
- Iva Stefanović
- Ivan Bosiljčić
- Ivan Šarabajić
- Ivan Zarić
- Ivana Aleksandrović
- Ivana Popović
- Ivana Vukčević
- Jakov Jevtović
- Jelena Đorđević Popović
- Jelena Gavrilović
- Jelena Jovičić
- Jelena Petrovic
- Jelena Stojiljković
- Jovan Jovčić
- Jovana Cavnić
- Jovana Mišković
- Katarina Kovačević
- Kaspar Vajnberg
- Lako Nikolić
- Lazar Dubovac
- Maja Šarenac
- Mariana Aranđelović
- Marija Dakić
- Marija Mihajlović
- Marija Stokić
- Marina Aleksić
- Marina Kutlešić
- Marina Vodeničar
- Marjan Apostolović
- Marko Gizdavić
- Marko Janjić
- Marko Marković
- Marko Mrđenović
- Marko Živić
- Matija Živković
- Mihailo Milidragović
- Mihailo Laptošević
- Mila Manojlović
- Miloš Anđelković
- Miloš Pjevač
- Mina Nenadović
- Milan Antonić
- Milan Čučilović
- Milan Milosavljević
- Milan Tubić
- Milena Moravčević
- Milena Živanović
- Milica Čalija
- Miloš Đuričić
- Miodrag Mihić
- Mladen Andrejević
- Mladena Veselinović
- Nada Blam
- Nataša Balog
- Nataša Popović
- Nemanja Oliverić
- Nenad Heraković
- Nenad Nenadović
- Nenad Stojmenović
- Nikola Bulatović
- Nikola Todorović
- Nina Lazarević
- Paulina Manov
- Pavle Ivanović
- Pavle Jerinić
- Peđa Damnjanović
- Predrag Đorđević
- Rade Ćosić
- Rade Knežević
- Radovan Vujović
- Sandra Spasovska
- Sanja Popović
- Sara Avramovski
- Saša Kuzmanović
- Siniša Ubović
- Slobodan Boda Ninković
- Slobodan Stefanović
- Snežana Knežević
- Snežana Jeremić
- Sofija Jeremić
- Sofija Juričan
- Srboljub Milin
- Srđan Jovanović
- Stefan Buzurović
- Stefan Kapičić
- Suzana Lukić
- Tamara Dragičević
- Teodora Živanović
- Tomaš Sarić
- Valentina Pavličić
- Veljko Racić
- Vesna Stanković
- Vladan Milić
- Vladan Živković
- Vladimir Tešović
- Vuk Gajić
- Zoran Ćosić
- Zorana Milošaković
- Željko Aleksić
- Željko Maksimović

=== Producers ===
- Bojan Puača
- Damjan Dašić
- Darko Obradović
- Dunja Đorđević
- Đurđica Gajić
- Igor Borojević
- Igor Jadranin
- Ivana Aleksandrović Ivee
- Marko Majer
- Nemanja Kojić
- Radovan Spasojević
- Slađana Crnić
- Slađana Dimitrijević
- Svetlana Beba Crnić
- Tatjana Gvozdenović
- Tijana Vujović
- Vladan Đokić
- Vladimir Zdunić
- Vukašin Vukotić
- Zoran Timotijević
- Željko Markuš
