= Kaeloo =

- A promotional poster for the fifth season.
- Genre: Surreal comedy; Fantasy; Slapstick; Black comedy; Adventure; Parody
- Created by: Rémi Chapotot; Jean-François Henry; Tristan Michel
- Based on: An original concept by Vincent Burgevin; Jean-François Henry
- Written by: Rémi Chapotot; Jean-François Henry
- Directed by: Rémi Chapotot; Antoine Rota (S1–2); Philippe Rolland (S3–4)
- Voices of: Emmanuel Garijo; Philippe Spiteri; Rémi Chapotot; Dorothée Pousséo; Féodor Atkine; Valentin Papoudof; Emilie Rollot
- Narrated by: Emmanuel Garijo; Rémi Chapotot (S4)
- Theme music composer: Franck Marchal
- Composer: Franck Marchal
- Country of origin: France
- Original language: French
- No. of seasons: 5
- No. of episodes: 241 (list of episodes)

Production
- Executive producer: Marc du Pontavice (S5)
- Producers: Lionel Fages (S1–4); Bruno Le Lever; Majid Loukil; Marc du Pontavice (S5)
- Running time: 7 minutes 26 minutes ("Et si on jouait à l'episode très special")
- Production companies: Cube Creative; Blue Spirit (S1–2); Xilam Animation (S5)

Original release
- Network: Canal+ Family (S1–2); Télétoon+ (S3–4); Canal+ Kids (S5)
- Release: 6 June 2010 – 13 April 2023

Kaeloo is a French animated comedy television series created by Rémi Chapotot, Jean-François Henry and Tristan Michel and produced by Cube Creative, with the participation of Canal+, CNC, Comptoir du Son, Blue Spirit (seasons 1–2) and Xilam Animation (season 5). The series, comprising 241 episodes across five seasons, aired from June 6, 2010, to April 13, 2023, on Canal+ Family, Canal+ Kids and Télétoon+, and also started airing on September 2017 on C8.

== Premise ==
The show centers around the adventures of a group of anthropomorphic animal friends, Kaeloo the frog (Kaelou in the pilot), Stumpy the squirrel, (Moignon in the pilot), Quack-Quack the duck, Mr. Cat the cat, and as of Seasons 2 and 5, Pretty the rabbit, Eugly the rabbit, Olaf the emperor penguin, Ursula the black cat, The Sheep, Game Rule and Stumpy's seven sisters, who live on a planet known as Smileyland (Pays Trop Mignon in French, which means "Very Cute Country" in English) and play games to keep themselves from getting bored. Things always go wrong due to Stumpy's ineptitude at almost everything, Quack-Quack's addiction to yogurt, Pretty's unkindness (in the earlier seasons), Eugly's emotional vulnerability (even though she is big, weighs 10 tons, and went to art school in season 5), Olaf's desire to take over the world, Mr. Cat's constant cheating and abuse of the others, and Kaeloo's ability to transform into a hulking toad monster named Bad Kaeloo (Bad Kaelou in the Pilot) when angered.

== Characters ==
Character	Voiced by	Seasons				
Character	Voiced by	1	2	3	4	5
Main Characters
Kaeloo (Kaelou)	Emmanuel Garijo (French); Andy Chase (Pilot, English); Doug Rand (Season 1, English); Matthew Géczy (Season 2, English); Vincent Tong (Season 5, Canadian English); Ian Hanlin (Bad Kaeloo, Season 5, Canadian English)	Main	Main	Main	Main	Main
Bad Kaeloo (Bad Kaelou)	Emmanuel Garijo (French); Andy Chase (Pilot, English); Doug Rand (Season 1, English); Matthew Géczy (Season 2, English); Vincent Tong (Season 5, Canadian English); Ian Hanlin (Bad Kaeloo, Season 5, Canadian English)	Main	Main	Main	Main	Main
Parallel/Interdimensional Kaeloo (Kaelou)	Emmanuel Garijo (French); Andy Chase (Pilot, English); Doug Rand (Season 1, English); Matthew Géczy (Season 2, English); Vincent Tong (Season 5, Canadian English); Ian Hanlin (Bad Kaeloo, Season 5, Canadian English)	Minor	Absent	Absent	Absent	Absent
Parallel/Interdimensional Bad Kaeloo (Bad Kaelou)	Emmanuel Garijo (French); Andy Chase (Pilot, English); Doug Rand (Season 1, English); Matthew Géczy (Season 2, English); Vincent Tong (Season 5, Canadian English); Ian Hanlin (Bad Kaeloo, Season 5, Canadian English)	Minor	Absent	Absent	Absent	Absent
Happy Rotter/Henry Frogger	Emmanuel Garijo (French); Andy Chase (Pilot, English); Doug Rand (Season 1, English); Matthew Géczy (Season 2, English); Vincent Tong (Season 5, Canadian English); Ian Hanlin (Bad Kaeloo, Season 5, Canadian English)	Minor	Absent	Absent	Absent	Absent
The Devil	Emmanuel Garijo (French); Andy Chase (Pilot, English); Doug Rand (Season 1, English); Matthew Géczy (Season 2, English); Vincent Tong (Season 5, Canadian English); Ian Hanlin (Bad Kaeloo, Season 5, Canadian English)	Off-Screen	Off-Screen	Absent	Absent	Absent
Kevin	Emmanuel Garijo (French); Andy Chase (Pilot, English); Doug Rand (Season 1, English); Matthew Géczy (Season 2, English); Vincent Tong (Season 5, Canadian English); Ian Hanlin (Bad Kaeloo, Season 5, Canadian English)	Absent	Absent	Minor	Minor	Absent
Kurt	Emmanuel Garijo (French); Andy Chase (Pilot, English); Doug Rand (Season 1, English); Matthew Géczy (Season 2, English); Vincent Tong (Season 5, Canadian English); Ian Hanlin (Bad Kaeloo, Season 5, Canadian English)	Absent	Absent	Minor	Minor	Absent
Jack	Emmanuel Garijo (French); Andy Chase (Pilot, English); Doug Rand (Season 1, English); Matthew Géczy (Season 2, English); Vincent Tong (Season 5, Canadian English); Ian Hanlin (Bad Kaeloo, Season 5, Canadian English)	Absent	Absent	Minor	Minor	Absent
Jamos	Emmanuel Garijo (French); Andy Chase (Pilot, English); Doug Rand (Season 1, English); Matthew Géczy (Season 2, English); Vincent Tong (Season 5, Canadian English); Ian Hanlin (Bad Kaeloo, Season 5, Canadian English)	Absent	Absent	Minor	Minor	Absent
Karl	Emmanuel Garijo (French); Andy Chase (Pilot, English); Doug Rand (Season 1, English); Matthew Géczy (Season 2, English); Vincent Tong (Season 5, Canadian English); Ian Hanlin (Bad Kaeloo, Season 5, Canadian English)	Absent	Absent	Minor	Minor	Absent
Narrator	Emmanuel Garijo (French); Andy Chase (Pilot, English); Doug Rand (Season 1, English); Matthew Géczy (Season 2, English); Vincent Tong (Season 5, Canadian English); Ian Hanlin (Bad Kaeloo, Season 5, Canadian English)	Off-Screen	Off-Screen	Off-Screen	Off-Screen	Off-Screen
Stumpy (Moignon)	Rémi Chapotot (French); Doug Rand (Pilot and Season 1, English); Andy Chase (Season 2, English); Cole Howard (Canadian English)	Main	Main	Main	Main	Main
Parallel/Interdimensional Stumpy (Moignon)	Rémi Chapotot (French); Doug Rand (Pilot and Season 1, English); Andy Chase (Season 2, English); Cole Howard (Canadian English)	Minor	Absent	Absent	Absent	Absent
Morpione	Rémi Chapotot (French); Doug Rand (Pilot and Season 1, English); Andy Chase (Season 2, English); Cole Howard (Canadian English)	Minor	Absent	Absent	Absent	Absent
Quack-Quack (Coin-Coin)	Rémi Chapotot (French); Doug Rand (Season 1, English); Vincent Tong (Canadian English)	Main	Main	Main	Main	Main
Mr. Duck (Parallel/Interdimensional Quack Quack (Coin-Coin))	Rémi Chapotot (French); Doug Rand (Season 1, English); Vincent Tong (Canadian English)	Minor	Absent	Absent	Absent	Absent
Red	Rémi Chapotot (French); Doug Rand (Season 1, English); Vincent Tong (Canadian English)	Minor	Absent	Absent	Absent	Absent
Mr. Cat (Monsieur Chat)/Hector	Philippe Spiteri (French); Christian Erickson (Pilot, English); Mike Powers (Season 1, English); David Gasman (Season 2, English); Paul Dobson (Canadian English)	Main	Main	Main	Main	Main
Meow-Meow (Parallel/Interdimensional Mr. Cat (Monsieur Chat) (Hector))	Philippe Spiteri (French); Christian Erickson (Pilot, English); Mike Powers (Season 1, English); David Gasman (Season 2, English); Paul Dobson (Canadian English)	Minor	Absent	Absent	Absent	Absent
Voldemob/Calazar/Hades	Philippe Spiteri (French); Christian Erickson (Pilot, English); Mike Powers (Season 1, English); David Gasman (Season 2, English); Paul Dobson (Canadian English)	Minor	Minor	Minor	Minor	Minor
The Sphinx	Philippe Spiteri (French); Christian Erickson (Pilot, English); Mike Powers (Season 1, English); David Gasman (Season 2, English); Paul Dobson (Canadian English)	Minor	Minor	Absent	Absent	Absent
The Sheep	Rémi Chapotot; Valentin Papoudof; Sarah Teyssier-Miko; Adrien Antoine	Minor	Minor	Minor	Minor	Minor
Secondary Characters
Pretty	Dorothée Pousséo; Barbara Weber-Scaff (Season 2, English)	Absent	Secondary	Secondary	Secondary	Secondary
Eugly	Rémi Chapotot	Absent	Secondary	Secondary	Secondary	Secondary
Olaf	Féodor Atkine; Matthew Géczy (Season 2, English)	Absent	Secondary	Secondary	Secondary	Secondary
Ursula	Sophie Michard	Absent	Absent	Minor	Off-Screen	Off-Screen
The Rules of the Games/Game Rule (La Règle du Jeu/M. Règle)	Valentin Papoudof (French); Travis Turner (Canadian English)	Absent	Absent	Absent	Absent	Secondary
Checkout (Ardoise)	Emilie Rollot	Absent	Absent	Absent	Absent	Secondary
Moldie (Cramoisie)	Emilie Rollot	Absent	Absent	Absent	Absent	Secondary
Lavenblah (Lavanade)	Emilie Rollot	Absent	Absent	Absent	Absent	Secondary
Me-Me (Nombril)	Emilie Rollot	Absent	Absent	Absent	Absent	Secondary
Snitchy (Poucave)	Emilie Rollot	Absent	Absent	Absent	Absent	Secondary
Purplish (Violasse)	Emilie Rollot	Absent	Absent	Absent	Absent	Secondary
Vitamin (Vitamine)	Emilie Rollot	Absent	Absent	Absent	Absent	Secondary

=== Main ===
- Kaeloo (Kaelou) (voiced by Emmanuel Garijo in French and Andy Chase (pilot), Doug Rand (Season 1), Matthew Géczy (Season 2) and Vincent Tong (Season 5) in English) - The titular character and main protagonist. She is an energetic and fun-loving but emotionally unstable and short-tempered tree frog who's always looking for games to play with her so-called "buddies" and often proposes suggestions to make everyone happy. While normally gentle and loving by nature (though she does have several crueler moments), when pushed too far, Kaeloo enters an intense, upset-fueled rage that transforms her into the hulking "Bad Kaeloo". Kaeloo has dissociative personality disorder and is gender-ambiguous in the French dub of the series; no one knowing her gender is a running gag, and it is implied that she is non-binary, intersex, or genderfluid. Kaeloo tends to prefer female pronouns, while Bad Kaeloo prefers male pronouns. Kaeloo is re-written to be female in most of the other dubs of the series; however, the Italian, Serbian, Hindi and Season 5 English dubs, and the first 10 episodes in the Season 1 English dub, have her re-written as male.
  - Bad Kaeloo (Bad Kaelou) (voiced by Emmanuel Garijo in French and Doug Rand (Season 1) and Ian Hanlin (Season 5) in English) - Whenever Kaeloo gets angry or frustrated enough, she transforms into this form, a male, hulking and brutish yet slow-witted toad. While she has stated in an early episode that the transformations must be triggered by anger, she has been seen in several episodes deliberately taking this form to cheat at games that require a level of physical prowess or to intimidate others. While remaining impulsive and brutal throughout the series, Bad Kaeloo gradually becomes calmer, kinder, gentler, and less fond of mindless acts of sadistic violence, and by season 5, Kaeloo can control her anger and transformations by subconsciously communicating with Bad Kaeloo through a bubble that appears next to the head of the one in control.
- Stumpy (Moignon) (voiced by Rémi Chapotot in French and Doug Rand (Pilot and Season 1), Andy Chase (Season 2) and Cole Howard (Season 5) in English) - A dim-witted and accident-prone red squirrel, fascinated by video games and comic books, alongside explosions, superpowers, intergalactic wars and anything remotely dangerous. He has little-to-no sense of reality, is often delusional, not very bright and immature, and generally comes up with the craziest ideas or reasonings, but means well.
- Quack-Quack (Coin-Coin) (voiced by Rémi Chapotot in French and Doug Rand (Season 1) and Vincent Tong (Season 5) in English) - A duck who is incapable of speech, only able to say his name, though everyone seems to understand what he is saying most of the time. "The Origin of Quack-Quack" details his backstory; whilst still in his egg, his parents were killed by a hunter. He was taken in by scientists who experimented on him, increasing his intelligence and making him indestructible.
- Mr. Cat (Monsieur Chat) (Hector) (voiced by Philippe Spiteri in French and Christian Erickson (Pilot), Mike Powers (Season 1), David Gasman (Season 2) and Paul Dobson (Season 5) in English) - Mr. Cat is a greedy bengal cat who always wants to win, and is even willing to cheat to do so. He especially enjoys torturing Quack Quack with his arsenal of weapons, which upsets Kaeloo and is the usual cause of her transformation into Bad Kaeloo. Despite (or perhaps because of) Kaeloo's transformations, he seems to have developed a crush on her; the feeling is reciprocated, and while they are not officially a couple, the other characters often talk about their feelings for each other and about them becoming a couple. It is implied in several episodes that he had an extremely difficult past that left him mentally, emotionally, and physically traumatized and had terrible relationships with his family, especially his brothers. Over the course of the series, he steadily becomes much nicer as a person, though he never completely sheds his cynical and tough edge.

=== Secondary ===
==== Season 2 ====
- Pretty (voiced by Dorothée Pousséo in French and Barbara Weber-Scaff (Season 2) in English) - A pink rabbit fashionista who is obsessed with fashion, beauty and all things stereotypically "girly". She is selfish, narcissistic, aggressive and regularly puts down those around her for petty reasons. Pretty has a crush on Mr. Cat (not that the feeling is even close to being reciprocated) and will go to extreme lengths to woo him. In season 5, Pretty befriends the four main characters, stops bullying them, and gets over her crush on Mr. Cat.
- Eugly (voiced by Rémi Chapotot) - Pretty's fraternal twin sister and polar opposite. Unlike Pretty, Eugly is ugly and fat, but has a very nice personality. Her immense strength makes her capable of intimidating or physically assaulting people, but she rarely does so of her own accord, usually only under Pretty's orders. Eugly is very emotional, and will burst into floods of tears at even the slightest insult. She eventually becomes Quack Quack's girlfriend. In season 5, Eugly leaves Smileyland to attend an art school, and her role is reduced to occasional cameos as a result.
- Olaf (voiced by Féodor Atkine in French and Matthew Géczy (Season 2) in English) - A Russian-accented emperor penguin who would like to take over the world and cover it with snow and ice, but is ultimately ineffectual. He is "married" to an ice cube named Olga and has a robot fridge named Serguei. In season 5, Olaf has a calmer and gentler personality, and is now an artist, which he enjoys using to express his emotions.
- Olga - Olaf's "wife", an ice cube. She was once gigantic, but gradually began melting from heat, so Olaf put her under a glass dome to prevent her from evaporating completely. While she seems to be not much more than an inanimate object, in the episode "Si on jouait au réchauffement climatique", Quack Quack speaks with Olga's "consciousness".
- Serguei - A sentient robotic fridge who serves as Olaf's henchman. It resembles a penguin, can move and perform all sorts of actions, but is speechless. Olaf can climb inside and use it as a mecha to compensate for its small size.
  - Mini-Serguei - A smaller variant of the more commonly-seen Serguei, Olaf's mini fridge can be seen in the last two episodes of season 2 and throughout season 4. A Mini-Serguei also serves as a keychain in one episode of season 3.

==== Season 3 ====
- Ursula (voiced by Sophie Michard) - A black cat, Stumpy's long-distance girlfriend who he met online, and one of the few people to actually treat him well and see what's in him beyond his unattractive looks and stupidity. She is mostly just mentioned in passing conversations between the other characters, or in the rare event she is physically present in the episode, offscreen. In the first season, Ursula's existence is often questioned. Indeed, we never physically see her and she is only mentioned by Stumpy. We can assume that Stumpy met her on Fakebook and that he saw her for the first time in reality in the episode "Let's Play Hot – Cold" where, thanks to Kaeloo's advice, he seduces her. But, since no one else has seen her face to face, the other characters come to wonder if Ursula is an imaginary girlfriend. This uncertainty remains in season 2 where in the episode "Si on jouait à la boom", she does not come to the Valentine's Day party, much to Stumpy's dismay. Pretty even claims that she does not exist, "like his sister". It is only in season 3 that Ursula's existence is confirmed when she appears in person at the end of the episode "Si on jouait à chercher Ursula... désespérément" (albeit offscreen), where we learn that she is very beautiful.
- Kevin, Kurt, Karl, Klaus, Karen (Karine), Krystal, Kahuna (Kilian) and Kimiko (all voiced by Emmanuel Garijo) - Kaeloo's cousins, who are all toads. With the exception of Kevin, they (especially Kurt and Karl) are all exceedingly cruel and love to make jokes at other people's expense. We never see or hear of Kaeloo's parents.

==== Season 4 ====
- The Sheep (all voiced by Rémi Chapotot, Valentin Papoudof, Sarah Teyssier-Miko, and Adrien Antoine) - The sheep sometimes participate in the main four's games, albeit usually unwillingly. For the first three seasons, the sheep were just regular, non-anthropomorphic sheep that could not talk and served as little more than props. In seasons 4 and 5, they are more active, animated, and capable of speech. Hervé is the leader of the sheep and the one who talks the most.

==== Season 5 ====
- The Rules of the Games/Game Rule (La Règle du Jeu/M. Règle) (voiced by Valentin Papoudof in French and Travis Turner in English) - A floating robotic alien that acts like a personification of the concept of rules and the main antagonist of season 5, having been sent to supervise Smileyland and fix the other characters' blatant disregard for rules when they play games. Game Rule takes games very seriously and imposes bizarre penalties on people who break the rules, but is friendly and cheerful towards those who follow the rules properly. In the original French dub, Game Rule is referred to with female pronouns, but in the English dub, they are non-binary and referred to by neutral pronouns.
- Law and Order - Game Rule's demanding and strict parents and the overarching antagonists of season 5, who are revealed near the end of the series. Game Rule is concerned about pleasing them and meeting their high expectations, even if it may come at the expense of Game Rule's own happiness. Concept art posted on Chapotot's website reveals that they have nicknamed Game Rule "Ru-ru".
- Stumpy's Sisters (all voiced by Emilie Rollot) - In the first four seasons, a running gag was that everyone (occasionally including Stumpy himself) didn't know if Stumpy's siblings were real or not, and jokes would often rely on their existence being ambiguous. Starting in Season 5, the existence of them (seven younger sisters) is finally confirmed, and the gag is retired as a result. In order, they are:
  - Checkout (Ardoise) - The helpful one who is good at handling finances and marketing.
  - Moldie (Cramoisie) - The abrasive bully-in-the-making who likes insulting and harassing others.
  - Lavenblah (Lavanade) - The quiet one with supernatural powers.
  - Me-Me (Nombril) - Stumpy's younger sister who always wants people's attention, especially his. Her catchphrase is "Stumpy, do you see me?".
  - Snitchy (Poucave) - An inquisitive child who aspires to become a journalist, which she practices for by spying on people to write about them.
  - Purplish (Violasse) - The one who carries a balloon everywhere and has terrible luck that constantly lands her into bad situations.
  - Vitamin (Vitamine) - Stumpy's sister who is so hyperactive that she moves at super speed and cannot interact with the world around her.
- Stumpy's Parents - Stumpy's mother and estranged father. The audience knows little about their identities, and most of what the audience does know of Stumpy's mother in particular is from what Stumpy says, which is implied to be disproportionately skewed to make her look worse than she actually is, though she is at least caring enough to stop him from juggling chainsaws in "Let's Play Circuses". Seasons 2 and 5 reveal that Stumpy's parents never married and the father was a "scary" alcoholic who used to come home red in the face. He eventually left the family, leaving his girlfriend to raise their eight children alone.
- The Cat Family - Mr. Cat's parents, Al Chatone (voiced by Philippe Spiteri) and Lola Felicia (voiced by Rémi Chapotot), and his two older brothers. They are strongly suggested to have been abusive to Mr. Cat, who eventually ran away from home to escape their abuse, meeting and befriending Kaeloo, Stumpy and Quack Quack along the way. "Let's Play with Snitchy" depicts that the mere sound of Lola's voice on a phone call is enough to make Mr. Cat have a panic attack strong enough to have to flee the scene, screaming to get away from her all the while. Al is stated to be an alcoholic gangster in "Si on jouait à il fait quoi ton père?". Mr. Cat's brothers used to violently abuse him for being their mother's favorite child. They never appear physically in the show and are only mentioned in passing by Mr. Cat.

== Episodes ==
Season	Episodes	Originally released		
Season	Episodes	First released	Last released	Network
Pilot	1	2007		Unaired
1	52	June 6, 2010	July 25, 2010	Canal+ Family
2	52	December 1, 2012	January 22, 2013	Canal+ Family
3	46	December 18, 2016	March 10, 2018	Télétoon+
4	52	December 25, 2019	January 6, 2020	Télétoon+
5	39	April 8, 2023	April 13, 2023	Canal+ Kids

== Release and reception ==
The launch of the series was made on June 6, 2010 as part of Canal+ Family's Cartoon+ block. The show is also broadcast on Canal+ and Télétoon+. Kaeloo is also distributed outside Canal+ Family. The series has received good reviews, with Télérama considering it "hilarious" and TV 2 Weeks as "a fast-paced cartoon and humor pest, which accomplishes the feat to entertain young and old".

=== DVD release ===
Kaeloo: Hide 'n' Hunt was released on Region 4 DVD by Beyond Home Entertainment on 1 December 2011. It contains the first 13 episodes of the English dub of Season 1.

As of 2026, the remaining four seasons of the show have not been released on DVD.

== International broadcasts ==
Region/Country	Network/Channel	Notes
France	Canal+ Family, Canal+ Kids, C8 and Télétoon+	Only seasons 1 and 2 aired on C8, while seasons 3 and 4 were on Télétoon+ and season 5 on Canal+ Kids
Belgium	RTBF, Auvio Kids TV	Aired since 3 February 2012
Portugal	Panda Biggs	From 2013 to 2014
Australia	NITV, ABC Television	Currently airing every day at 7:30 a.m.
Ukraine	K1	(only in English) From 2015 to 2016
United Kingdom	CBBC	From 2013 to 2017
Indonesia	RTV	Since 2022
Poland	Teletoon+	Only season 3
Italy	Super!, DeA Kids	Only seasons 2 to 5
Greece	Smile TV	Currently airing every day at 2:30 p.m and 8:00 p.m.
Serbia	Ultra, Pink Super Kids, Dexy TV, Vavoom, Pikaboo	Dubbed by Loudworks; only seasons 1 to 3
Saudi Arabia	MBC 3	Only season 4
Iran	Afarinak	Only season 1
Hungary	Kölyökklub	Since 2025
India	Nickelodeon	Only season 1
Mauritius	Kids Channel	From 2010 to 2014

As of 2026, the show is not available in the United States, Canada, Spain, Latin America, Russia, Turkey, Luxembourg, Germany, Romania, and the Netherlands, due to dubbing issues and concerns about the show being suitable for kids to watch due to black comedy being present in some episodes.

== Awards and nominations ==
Year	Award	Category	Result
2011	Kids Screen Awards	Kids Screen Awards for Best Series of the Year for the Family category.	Won
2011	Audience Award	Audience Award at the Festival de Liège Stereo media for the episode "Let's Play the Quest for the Wholly Gruel (Si on jouait à la quête du greul)".	Won
2011	Kids Screen Awards	Selection in the official competition of the Annecy Animation Festival 2011 in the category TV Series for the episode "Let's Play Prince Charming (Si on jouait au prince charmant)".	Nominated
2011	Kids Screen Awards	Kids Screen Awards for Best Series of the Year for Class Family.	Nominated

== In other media ==
=== Video games ===
A mobile video game adapted from the series titled Kaeloo Rush was released on Android on July 18, 2016. In this game, Kaeloo must protect Quack-Quack and Smileyland at large from Mr. Cat's ammunition. The game contains 40 levels. Unfortunately, it has been unavailable in France since 2023 for unknown reasons.

Two sequels, Si on jouait au photomatou and Si on jouait au zikbox, mini games developed by Cube Creative and Télétoon+, were released in 2017.

=== Comic book ===
Kaeloo is a comic book series based on the cartoon of the same name. The first issue, titled Let's Play..., was released in July 2018.
