= Lola and Mila =

Serbian animated television series

- Serbian: Лола и Мила / Lola i Mila
- Genre: Animated cartoon
- Created by: Sergej Ćetković
- Written by: Aleksandra Urošević, Dunja Petrović
- Music by: Aleksandar Buzadzic
- Composer: Aleksandar Buzadzic
- Country of origin: Serbia
- Original language: Serbian
- No. of seasons: 1
- No. of episodes: 10

Production
- Executive producer: EVENT MEDIA
- Running time: 5-7 minutes
- Production companies: Studio Carousel; Event Media Production

Original release
- Network: Pikaboo
- Release: 21 May 2018 – June 19, 2018

Lola and Mila (Serbian: Лола и Мила / Lola i Mila) is a Serbian animated television series created by Sergej Ćetković and produced by Studio Carousel and Event Media Production. The show focuses on the adventures of two little girls Lola and Mila, named after Sergej's daughters. As they spend their time exploring new things, they fall into situations that are entertaining but educational as well.

== Production ==
Sergej Ćetković together with spouse Kristina Ćetković and other team members started the work on this project in 2017. During the year, they finished the picture book What is Sweeter than a Cake, used as a basis for children's educational animated program.

== International broadcast ==
The first season contained 10 episodes, with airing started on May 21, 2018. on Pikaboo channel.

Country/region	Language	Channel(s)
Serbia	Serbian	Pikaboo, RTS 2
Montenegro	Serbian	Pikaboo
Republika Srpska	Serbian	Pikaboo
Croatia	Croatian	Pikaboo
Federation of Bosnia and Herzegovina	Croatian	Pikaboo
Slovenia	Slovenian	Pikaboo
Republic of Macedonia	Macedonian	Pikaboo
Albania	Albanian	Pikaboo
Bulgaria	Bulgarian	IDJ Kids
