= List of Kaeloo episodes =

The following is a list of episodes from Kaeloo, a French animated television series produced by Cube Creative, Blue Spirit (seasons 1–2) and Xilam Animation (season 5), in collaboration with Canal+, CNC and Comptoir du Son, respectively for channels Canal+ Family (seasons 1–2), Télétoon+ (seasons 3–4) and Canal+ Kids (season 5). The series has aired 241 episodes, with most being 7 minutes long (the third season premiere, "Et si on jouait à l'episode très special", is a quadruple-length special clocking in at 26 minutes).

Kaeloo centers around the adventures of a group of anthropomorphic animal friends, Kaeloo the frog (Kaelou in the pilot), Stumpy the squirrel, (Moignon in the pilot), Quack-Quack the duck, Mr. Cat the cat, and as of Seasons 2 and 5, Pretty the rabbit, Eugly the rabbit, Olaf the penguin, Game Rule and Stumpy's seven sisters, who live on a planet known as Smileyland (Pays Trop Mignon in French, which means "Very Cute Country") and play games to keep themselves from getting bored. Things always go wrong due to Stumpy's ineptitude at almost everything, Quack-Quack's addiction to yogurt, Pretty's unkindness (in the earlier seasons), Eugly's emotional vulnerability (even though she is big, weighs 10 tons, and went to art school in season 5), Olaf's desire to take over the world, Mr. Cat's constant cheating and abuse of the others, and Kaeloo's ability to transform into a hulking toad monster named Bad Kaeloo (Bad Kaelou in the Pilot) when angered.

The series premiered on Canal+ Family's Cartoon+ block in France on June 6, 2010 with its first season, followed by the second on December 1, 2012, the third on December 18, 2016, the fourth on December 25, 2019, and the fifth on April 8, 2023. The fifth season concluded on April 13, 2023, and there have been no plans to continue the show since then. On June 13, 2024, series co-creator Rémi Chapotot announced on his Instagram that he was leaving Cube Creative, seemingly ending any chances of Kaeloo coming back.

== Series overview ==
Season	Episodes	Originally released		
Season	Episodes	First released	Last released	Network
Pilot	1	2007		Unaired
1	52	June 6, 2010	July 25, 2010	Canal+ Family
2	52	December 1, 2012	January 22, 2013	Canal+ Family
3	46	December 18, 2016	March 10, 2018	Télétoon+
4	52	December 25, 2019	January 6, 2020	Télétoon+
5	39	April 8, 2023	April 13, 2023	Canal+ Kids

== Pilot (2007) ==
Kaeloo was originally a three-minute short film animation created in 2007, titled Kaelou: Red Light, Green Light... 1, 2, 3!!! (Kaelou: 1, 2, 3 Je Te Saigne!) and presented to MIPTV in the same year. It is widely considered the pilot of the series, and was adapted into "Let's Play Red Light, Green Light".

Title (French title bottom)	Directed and written by	Original release date
"Kaelou: Red Light, Green Light... 1, 2, 3!!!" "(Kaelou: 1, 2, 3 Je Te Saigne!)"	Rémi Chapotot; Bertrand Toedesco	2007
A frog named Kaelou (name changed to "Kaeloo" in 2010) tries to play Red Light, Green Light, 1, 2, 3 with her/his friends Moignon (name changed to "Stumpy" in 2010) the squirrel, Quack-Quack the indestructible duck, and Mr. Cat the cat. Mr. Cat keeps tormenting Quack-Quack and ruining the game. NOTE: First appearances of Kaelou (Kaeloo), Moignon (Stumpy), Quack-Quack, and Mr. Cat. Adding the sound of a high-pitched, shrill cry, often accompanied by sound effects, Kaelou becomes angry and shouts Mr. Cat's name while the sky flashes Dark brown as she rapidly approaches the camera. Her green skin becomes more yellow and brighter, with cracks appearing on her face. Her eyes are red and bulging, giving her a fierce and menacing appearance. Light and particles fly around her. During kaelou's transformation into bad kaelou, her thighs become muscular, making the ground creak under her feet, and her arms become large and muscular one by one, and then we see that her buttocks become more robust. In End, Adding the sound of a high-pitched, shrill scream, often accompanied by sound effects, Kaelou's transformation begins. When Kaeloo rages at the camera, her eyes turn red, indicating a surge of anger. Simultaneously, the background undergoes a subtle change: the sky becomes dark-black, darker, and more intensely colored, shifting from soft, peaceful hues to warmer, more saturated tones.

== Episodes ==
All episodes are directed by Rémi Chapotot.

=== Season 1 (2010) ===
The first season of the show premiered on June 6, 2010. It has been dubbed in English.

No. overall	No. in season	Title (French title bottom)	Directed by	Written by	Storyboard by	Original release date	Belgium air date
1	1	"Let's Play Prison Ball" "(Si on jouait à la balle au prisonnier)"	Rémi Chapotot	Rémi Chapotot	Rémi Chapotot	June 6, 2010	July 11, 2011
The buddies are playing prison-ball, with Kaeloo and Quack-Quack in one team and Mr. Cat and Stumpy in the other. Kaeloo turns out to be really good at catching the ball, and Stumpy takes the term "prison" in "prison ball" too literally.
2	2	"Let's Play Doctors & Nurses" "(Si on jouait aux docteurs)"	Rémi Chapotot	Yves Coulon	Didier Ah-Koon	June 7, 2010	July 18, 2011
When Stumpy catches the flu, Kaeloo and Mr. Cat neglect him and take care of Quack-Quack, who is perfectly healthy.
3	3	"Let's Play Red Light, Green Light" "(Si on jouait à ...1, 2, 3... soleil!!!)"	Rémi Chapotot	Rémi Chapotot; Jean-François Henry	Didier Ah-Koon	June 8, 2010	July 25, 2011
The buddies are playing Red Light, Green Light, but Mr. Cat keeps tormenting Quack-Quack as usual when Kaeloo's back is turned.
4	4	"Let's Play at Reading Books" "(Si on jouait à lire des livres)"	Rémi Chapotot	Rémi Chapotot; Jean-François Henry	Frédéric Martin	June 9, 2010	August 2, 2011
The buddies decide to read books. Stumpy searches for Mr. Coolskin comics at the library, and Quack-Quack and Mr. Cat fight over a book with pictures of pin-up girls.
5	5	"Let's Play Magicians" "(Si on jouait à la magie)"	Rémi Chapotot	Rémi Chapotot	Didier Ah-Koon	June 10, 2010	August 9, 2011
The buddies put on a magic show, and Stumpy is devastated to find out that magic isn't real.
6	6	"Let's Play Hopscotch" "(Si on jouait à la marelle)"	Rémi Chapotot	Olivier Jean-Marie	Didier Ah-Koon	June 11, 2010	August 16, 2011
When Quack-Quack goes to Heaven after playing a game of hopscotch, Kaeloo and Stumpy want to go as well, but they are unable to.
7	7	"Let's Play Trap Trap" "(Si on jouait à trap trap)"	Rémi Chapotot	Yves Coulon	Julien Thompson	June 13, 2010	August 23, 2011
Kaeloo forces Quack-Quack to go for one hour without eating yogurt, but this causes him to experience withdrawal symptoms and behave like a zombie.
8	8	"Let's Play Teachers" "(Si on jouait à la maîtresse)"	Rémi Chapotot	Jean-François Henry	Julien Thompson	June 14, 2010	September 3, 2011
Kaeloo forces Stumpy to play a game where she is the teacher and he and Quack-Quack are students. Stumpy tries to get sent out of the school.
9	9	"Let's Play Cops 'n' Robbers" "(Si on jouait au gendarme et au voleur)"	Rémi Chapotot	Rémi Chapotot; Jean-François Henry	Julien Thompson	June 15, 2010	September 4, 2011
Quack-Quack's yogurt is stolen, so Mr. Cat decides to launch an investigation to find out who stole them. Unfortunately, everyone else believes that he himself was the culprit.
10	10	"Let's Play Simon Says!!!" "(Si on jouait à Jacques a dit!!!)"	Rémi Chapotot	Olivier Jean-Marie	Didier Ah-Koon	June 16, 2010	September 5, 2011
Kaeloo decides to play Simon Says to get her friends to clean up a huge mess they made. Chaos ensues when Mr. Cat decides to play Simon.
11	11	"Let's Play Happy Rotter" "(Si on jouait à Happy Rotter)"	Rémi Chapotot	Jean-François Henry	Didier Ah-Koon	June 17, 2010	September 6, 2011
Kaeloo and her friends decide to role-play as the characters from a book known as "Happy Rotter" (a parody of Harry Potter).
12	12	"Let's Play TV News!" "(Si on jouait au journal télé!)"	Rémi Chapotot	Yves Coulon	Thierry Sapyn	June 17, 2010	September 7, 2011
Kaeloo starts a TV news channel, and Mr. Cat is annoyed by the predictability of the news. He then invents a device to measure the viewers' satisfaction.
13	13	"Let's Play Hide 'n' Hunt!" "(Si on jouait à chasse cache!)"	Rémi Chapotot	Jean-François Henry	Didier Ah-Koon	June 18, 2010	September 8, 2011
Mr. Cat comes up with a violent version of Hide and Seek, in which he turns Smileyland into a first person shooter-type labyrinth and the others, each with two clones of themselves, must escape from him while he chases them with a bazooka.
14	14	"Let's Play Ecologists" "(Si on jouait à l'écologie)"	Rémi Chapotot	Jean-Marc Lenglen	Julien Thompson	June 19, 2010	September 11, 2011
Kaeloo attempts to educate her friends on ecology, but takes it a bit too far.
15	15	"Let's Play Prince Charming" "(Si on jouait au prince charmant)"	Rémi Chapotot	Jean-Marc Lenglen	Didier Ah-Koon	June 20, 2010	September 13, 2011
Quack-Quack is Prince Charming, who must rescue Princess Stumpy. The so-called "princess", meanwhile, is searching for a girlfriend on Fakebook (a parody of Facebook).
16	16	"Let's Play Danger Island Survivor" "(Si on jouait à l'île de l'aventure du danger)"	Rémi Chapotot	Olivier Jean-Marie	Julien Thompson	June 21, 2010	September 14, 2011
The buddies try to recreate a reality-competition game show they saw on TV and each day a competitor is eliminated. To their annoyance, Kaeloo sets up mundane tasks and asks them to pretend it's dangerous.
17	17	"Let's Play Peace, Man!!!" "(Si on jouait à la paix)"	Rémi Chapotot	Jean-Marc Lenglen	Julien Thompson	June 22, 2010	September 15, 2011
After Mr. Cat and Stumpy decide to play "war", Kaeloo teaches them a different game, which consists of remaining calm and not getting angry.
18	18	"Let's Play Market Vendors!" "(Si on jouait à la marchande)"	Rémi Chapotot	Jean-Marc Lenglen	Thierry Sapyn	June 23, 2010	September 16, 2011
Kaeloo sets up a market stall to sell apples. Stumpy sets up a rival stall and steals Kaeloo's apples to sell.
19	19	"Let's Play House!" "(Si on jouait à papa-maman)"	Rémi Chapotot	Olivier Jean-Marie	Julien Thompson	June 24, 2010	September 17, 2011
The buddies are playing house: Kaeloo is the mother, Mr. Cat is the father, Stumpy is the son, and Quack-Quack is the daughter. The "family" is far from perfect.
20	20	"Let's Play Scaredy Cat" "(Si on jouait à se faire peur)"	Rémi Chapotot	Rémi Chapotot	Antoine Rota	June 25, 2010	September 18, 2011
Stumpy raises the dead on Halloween night, and Mr. Cat must fight the zombies by himself.
21	21	"Let's Play Baby-Sitting" "(Si on jouait au baby-sitting)"	Rémi Chapotot	Yves Coulon	Julien Thompson	June 26, 2010	September 19, 2011
Stumpy sets Kaeloo and Mr. Cat up on a date in the hopes that Kaeloo will get pregnant, and he can babysit her baby to make money. In the meantime, he practices by babysitting Quack-Quack.
22	22	"Let's Play Spies" "(Si on jouait aux espions)"	Rémi Chapotot	Olivier Jean-Marie	Thierry Sapyn	June 27, 2010	September 20, 2011
Kaeloo, Mr. Cat, and Stumpy are spies who must stop Quack-Quack, a terrorist who specializes in explosive yogurts. Stumpy, wanting to be the bad guy for once, does everything he can to betray his teammates.
23	23	"Let's Play Air Pockets" "(Si on jouait aux trous d'air)"	Rémi Chapotot	Olivier Jean-Marie	Thierry Sapyn	June 28, 2010	September 21, 2011
Kaeloo forces Stumpy to take a trip on an airplane despite his acrophobia.
24	24	"Let's Play the Quest for the Wholly Gruel" "(Si on jouait à la quête du greul)"	Rémi Chapotot	Jean-Marc Lenglen	Antoine Rota	June 29, 2010	September 22, 2011
In a parody of Indiana Jones, Quack-Quack, an explorer, and Mr. Cat, an evil Nazi, go on a quest for the Wholly Gruel, a legendary artifact. NOTE: The episode was released to the Annecy Animation Festival 2010 in 3D.
25	25	"Let's Play Golf!" "(Si on jouait au golf!)"	Rémi Chapotot	Jean-Marc Lenglen	Gaston Jaunet	June 30, 2010	September 23, 2011
Kaeloo realizes that her friends are all better than her at golf, so she resorts to cheating.
26	26	"Let's Play Catch the Mailman" "(Si on jouait au facteur)"	Rémi Chapotot	Alexandre Reverend	Thierry Sapyn	July 1, 2010	September 24, 2011
Kaeloo receives a letter from somebody claiming to be a fan of the series, complaining that she is boring.
27	27	"Let's Play Treasure Hunt" "(Si on jouait au jeu de piste)"	Rémi Chapotot	Jean-François Henry	Gaston Jaunet	July 2, 2010	September 25, 2011
Kaeloo sets up a treasure hunt, but Mr. Cat changes all the clues.
28	28	"Let's Play Cowboys and Indians" "(Si on jouait aux cowboys et aux indiens)"	Rémi Chapotot	Yves Coulon; Rémi Chapotot	Antoine Rota	July 3, 2010	September 26, 2011
Kaeloo is on her way to make a speech with Quack-Quack, a cowboy. Mr. Cat kidnaps Kaeloo to lure Quack Quack into a trap.
29	29	"Let's Play Time Travel" "(Si on jouait à voyager dans le temps...)"	Rémi Chapotot	Stéphane Allegret	Julien Thompson	July 4, 2010	September 27, 2011
The buddies travel back in time to find a serial killer.
30	30	"Let's Play Grown-Ups" "(Si on jouait aux grands)"	Rémi Chapotot	Christophe Poujol	Thierry Sapyn	July 5, 2010	September 28, 2011
Kaeloo, Stumpy, and Quack-Quack use a machine to turn themselves into adults. Mr. Cat has to return them back to normal.
31	31	"Let's Play Me-Me-Nopoly" "(Si on jouait aux minopolistes)"	Rémi Chapotot	Olivier Jean-Marie	Gaston Jaunet	July 6, 2010	September 29, 2011
The buddies play "Me-Me-Nopoly", a parody of Monopoly, to see who gets ownership of the sofa.
32	32	"Let's Play Art Class" "(Si on jouait à faire de l'art)"	Rémi Chapotot	Valentine Milville	Antoine Rota	July 7, 2010	September 30, 2011
The buddies are making art, and Stumpy turns out to be a great artist.
33	33	"Let's Play Circuses" "(Si on jouait au cirque)"	Rémi Chapotot	Stéphane Allegret	Cédric Guarneri	July 8, 2010	October 1, 2011
The circus has come to Smileyland, with artistes like Stumpy the clown and Quack-Quack the acrobat.
34	34	"Let's Play Goodbye, Mr. Cat" "(Si on jouait à goodbye Mr Chat)"	Rémi Chapotot	Olivier Jean-Marie	Antoine Rota	July 9, 2010	October 2, 2011
When Mr. Cat seemingly becomes a teenager, he finds out that teenagers aren't allowed in Smileyland. The others attempt to help him find his inner child so that he can stay with them.
35	35	"Let's Play Courtroom Drama" "(Si on jouait au tribunal)"	Rémi Chapotot	Loïc Nicoloff	Thierry Sapyn	July 10, 2010	October 15, 2011
When Quack-Quack is found cut up into pieces, Kaeloo accuses Mr. Cat of being the culprit. Mr. Cat demands a trial in court to prove his innocence.
36	36	"Let's Play Musical Chairs" "(Si on jouait aux chaises musicales)"	Rémi Chapotot	Jean-François Henry	Cédric Guarneri	October 18, 2010	October 16, 2011
Kaeloo decides to play Musical Chairs with her buddies despite their clear lack of enthusiasm, and Stumpy decides to "befriend" Smileyland's chairs.
37	37	"Let's Play Psychics"	Rémi Chapotot	Loïc Nicoloff	Cédric Guarneri	July 13, 2010	October 22, 2011
37	37	"Let's Play Paranormal Stuff"	Rémi Chapotot	Loïc Nicoloff	Cédric Guarneri	July 13, 2010	October 22, 2011
Kaeloo predicts a series of misfortunes in Mr. Cat's future, which he refuses to believe. The buddies then hold a séance to see if they can communicate with spirits.
38	38	"Let's Play Driver's License" "(Si on jouait au permis de conduire)"	Rémi Chapotot	Rémi Chapotot	Cédric Guarneri	July 14, 2010	October 23, 2011
Stumpy and Quack-Quack try to get their driver's licenses.
39	39	"Let's Play Super Powers" "(Si on jouait aux super pouvoirs)"	Rémi Chapotot	Valentine Milville; Rémi Chapotot	Gaston Jaunet	July 15, 2010	October 29, 2011
The grand prize for eating 712 yogurts is a pack of Mr. Coolskin cards that grant the user superpowers. Stumpy gets Quack-Quack to eat the yogurt for him, and the buddies play with the cards.
40	40	"Let's Play Astronauts" "(Si on jouait aux cosmonautes)"	Rémi Chapotot	Jean-François Henry	Cédric Guarneri	July 16, 2010	October 30, 2011
The buddies find a parallel planet Smileyland on the other side of the galaxy, where Kaeloo's transformations work in reverse, Mr. Cat eats yogurt, Quack-Quack torments him, and Stumpy is intelligent.
41	41	"Let's Play Justice Masters" "(Si on jouait au justicier masqué)"	Rémi Chapotot	Jean-Marc Lenglen	Thierry Sapyn	July 17, 2010	November 21, 2011
Mr. Cat's doctor tells him that he needs to relax, as he is extremely stressed. The others try to help him out, but they end up stressing him out even more.
42	42	"Let's Play Detectives" "(Si on jouait aux détectives)"	Rémi Chapotot	Yves Coulon	Antoine Ettori	July 18, 2010	November 28, 2011
Kaeloo and Mr. Cat compete to see who can find Stumpy's missing sister first.
43	43	"Let's Play Basketball"	Rémi Chapotot	Loïc Nicoloff; Jean-François Henry	Antoine Ettori	July 19, 2010	December 2, 2011
43	43	"Let's Play Streetball"	Rémi Chapotot	Loïc Nicoloff; Jean-François Henry	Antoine Ettori	July 19, 2010	December 2, 2011
The buddies play basketball, and Kaeloo is determined not to get angry because she does not want to go to Hell. Songs Included: Le slam en "ouille", On the Way to Hell
44	44	"Let's Play the Thing from Outer Space" "(Si on jouait à la chose venue de l'espace)"	Rémi Chapotot	Olivier Jean-Marie	Gaston Jaunet	July 20, 2010	February 7, 2012
A strange object falls out of the sky. Kaeloo and Quack-Quack want to keep it, but Mr. Cat and Stumpy try to get rid of it because they think it might be dangerous.
45	45	"Let's Play Hot – Cold" "(Si on jouait à chaud froid)"	Rémi Chapotot	Cassandre Horenz; Jean-François Henry	Cédric Guarneri	July 21, 2010	February 14, 2012
Stumpy tries to impress his girlfriend, Ursula. Note: The English dub of this episode was skipped in NITV airings. Excerpts from the episode can be found on Doug Rand's Vimeo account, though.
46	46	"Let's Play Once Upon a Time" "(Si on jouait à il était une fois)"	Rémi Chapotot	Jean-Marc Lenglen; Jean-François Henry	Cédric Guarneri	July 21, 2010	February 21, 2012
Kaeloo tries telling her buddies a bedtime story, but things turn chaotic when Stumpy decides to take over the narration.
47	47	"Let's Play Tennis" "(Si on jouait au tennis)"	Rémi Chapotot	Jean-Marc Lenglen	Thierry Sapyn	July 24, 2010	February 28, 2012
Kaeloo and Stumpy, with help from Mr. Cat, play tennis against Quack-Quack. Mr. Cat decides to help his team win by cheating.
48	48	"Let's Play Figurines" "(Si on jouait aux figurines)"	Rémi Chapotot	Chloé Glachant; Régis Jaulin	Thierry Sapyn	July 24, 2010	March 10, 2012
The buddies receive figurines of themselves. Stumpy wants to play "war" with the others' figurines, but they refuse to give them to him.
49	49	"Let's Play Gangster Poker" "(Si on jouait au gangster poker)"	Rémi Chapotot	Christophe Poujol; Rémi Chapotot	Thierry Sapyn	July 25, 2010	March 10, 2012
The buddies play poker with a pretend deck of cards (since Stumpy misplaced the actual deck), and decide to use pretend money as well.
50	50	"Let's Play Guess Who!" "(Si on jouait à devine qui c'est)"	Rémi Chapotot	Jean-François Henry	Antoine Ettori	July 25, 2010	March 17, 2012
The buddies play Guess Who, and Mr. Cat decides to use Quack-Quack to re-enact some of history's most violent moments.
51	51	"Let's Play Tea Party" "(Si on jouait à la dînette)"	Rémi Chapotot	François Ruscak; Rémi Chapotot	Cédric Guarneri	July 25, 2010	March 17, 2012
Kaeloo is holding a tea party. Quack-Quack is irreproachable, but Mr. Cat and Stumpy are being rude and sloppy.
52	52	"Let's Play Bye-Bye Yoghurt" "(Si on jouait à bye-bye Yoghourt)"	Rémi Chapotot	Rémi Chapotot	Antoine Ettori	July 25, 2010	March 24, 2012
The buddies try to cheer Quack Quack up after the death (expiration) of one of his yogurts. The buddies later hold a funeral for the expired yoghurt.

=== Season 2 (2012–13) ===
A second season was greenlit, made and aired in France in 2012 and 2013, but it has not yet been dubbed into English, the sole exception being the episode "What if We Played at Riding Ponies?". The English title for the episode "Let's Play School-Run, Work, Bedtime" was provided at Annecy 2013, despite the episode having no English dub. A sneak peek of the episode "Si on jouait au fitness shaolin" was screened on June 10 and 13, 2012 during the Annecy Animation Festival.

No. overall	No. in season	French Title	Directed by	Story by	Storyboard by	Original release date	Belgium air date
53	1	"Si on jouait aux gentleman cambrioleurs"	Rémi Chapotot	Jean-Marc Lenglen	Antoine Rota	December 1, 2012	December 2, 2012
Kaeloo and Stumpy kidnap Olga, an ice cube which their neighbor Olaf considers to be his "wife", in order to get Olaf to play with them. NOTE: First appearances of Olaf, Olga, and Serguei.
54	2	"Si on jouait au jeu de la vérité"	Rémi Chapotot	Jean-Marc Lenglen	Antoine Rota	December 2, 2012	December 1, 2012
The main four play Truth or Dare with their neighbors, twin sisters Pretty and Eugly. Pretty, who has a crush on Mr. Cat, tries to get him to confess who he has a crush on, and Quack-Quack falls for Eugly. NOTE: First appearances of Pretty and Eugly.
55	3	"Si on jouait aux dangers domestiques"	Rémi Chapotot	Arnold Boiseau	Antoine Rota	December 3, 2012	December 6, 2012
Kaeloo attempts to educate her friends on household hazards, but they seem to be more interested in listening to Olaf's plans for world domination. Song Included: La comptine des dangers domestiques
56	4	"What if We Played at Riding Ponies?" "(Si on jouait à faire du cheval)"	Rémi Chapotot	Agnès Slimocivi	Cédric Guarneri	December 4, 2012	December 14, 2012
While Kaeloo and Pretty have a fight with each other, Stumpy and Quack-Quack have a horse race, where Mr. Cat and Olaf bet money on who will win.
57	5	"Si on jouait à Madame Chance"	Rémi Chapotot	Yves Coulon	Boris Zaiontchkovsky	December 5, 2012	December 16, 2012
Kaeloo starts a lottery and Mr. Cat and Quack-Quack participate. To Mr. Cat's annoyance, Quack Quack keeps winning each time.
58	6	"Si on jouait à ki cé ka raison"	Rémi Chapotot	Rémi Chapotot; Jean-Marc Lenglen	Antoine Ettori	December 6, 2012	December 29, 2012
Mr. Cat goes on a game show called "Ki Cé Ka Raison" hosted by Kaeloo to prove that he is right about everything all the time. The only problem is that the game show is rigged.
59	7	"Si on jouait aux toques toquées"	Rémi Chapotot	Jean-François Henry; Delphine Dubos	Cédric Guarneri	December 7, 2012	December 21, 2012
The buddies hold a cooking competition judged by Olaf.
60	8	"Si on jouait au mariage"	Rémi Chapotot	Agnès Slimovici	Cédric Guarneri	December 8, 2012	January 22, 2013
The buddies play "wedding". Quack-Quack is the groom, and to the chagrin of both Quack-Quack and Eugly, Pretty proclaims herself as the bride.
61	9	"Si on jouait aux vacances... aux naufragés"	Rémi Chapotot	Jean-Marc Lenglen	Cédric Guarneri	December 9, 2012	January 29, 2013
The buddies try to go on vacation, but something goes wrong with their airplane. Kaeloo and Stumpy crash on one side of an island, and Quack-Quack and Mr. Cat on the other side, but (un)fortunately, Pretty and Eugly decide to rescue them.
62	10	"Si on jouait au WPTM Catch Championship"	Rémi Chapotot	Denis Lima	Joan Gouviac	December 10, 2012	February 7, 2013
Kaeloo allows Mr. Cat to host a wrestling competition on the grounds that everything is "cute".
63	11	"Si on jouait au fitness shaolin"	Rémi Chapotot	Christophe Joaquin; Alexandre Manneville	Yani Ouabdesselam	December 11, 2012	February 14, 2013
When Mr. Cat forcefully takes all of Stumpy's comic books, Kaeloo decides to teach him and Quack-Quack martial arts to defend themselves.
64	12	"Si on jouait au McDaube"	Rémi Chapotot	Mathieu Choquet	Antoine Rota	December 12, 2012	February 21, 2013
Mr. Cat opens a fast food restaurant called the McDaube, much to Kaeloo's disgust. Her disgust is justified, given the terrible conditions of the restaurant.
65	13	"Si on jouait à la clone party"	Rémi Chapotot	Yves Coulon	Cédric Guarneri	December 13, 2012	February 28, 2013
Kaeloo, Quack-Quack and Stumpy all show up at a costume party dressed as Mr. Cat and argue about who does it better. To settle the matter, they have a Mr. Cat-impersonating competition.
66	14	"Si on jouait à la guerre des yaourts"	Rémi Chapotot	Jean-Marc Lenglen; Jean-François Henry	Antoine Rota	December 14, 2012	March 1, 2013
Kaeloo buys Quack-Quack fruit-flavored yogurt when there's no plain ones available. He loves the taste even better than that of plain yogurt, so the living plain yogurts, afraid of losing their biggest consumer, get Olaf to help them wage war against the fruit flavored ones.
67	15	"Si on jouait à tutu à gogo"	Rémi Chapotot	Agnès Slimovici	Cédric Guarneri	December 15, 2012	March 2, 2013
Olaf enlists Kaeloo's help in preparing something to celebrate Olga's birthday, which he forgot about. Kaeloo decides that she and the others can do a ballet recital.
68	16	"Si on jouait au chef d'orchestre"	Rémi Chapotot	Christophe Joaquin; Alexandre Manneville	Yani Ouabdesselam	December 16, 2012	April 5, 2013
The buddies play "Orchestra Conductor", a game where one person is the "orchestra conductor" and gets the others to play a song, and another player must guess who the "orchestra conductor" is. This eventually leads to them forming their own rock band, which becomes extremely popular. Song Included: Crève les tous
69	17	"Si on jouait à hallo hello ola"	Rémi Chapotot	Denis Lima; Jean-François Henry	Cédric Guarneri	December 17, 2012	April 19, 2013
When it's winter in Smileyland, Kaeloo decides to teach the viewers various languages, but Stumpy and Mr. Cat aren't being very helpful.
70	18	"Si on jouait à cache-cache interdimensionnel"	Rémi Chapotot	Jean-François Henry	Antoine Rota	December 18, 2012	April 26, 2013
Kaeloo, Stumpy and Quack-Quack are playing hide and seek. When Stumpy can't find a place to hide, Mr. Cat shows him a door leading to another dimension. NOTE: First appearance of Interdimensionals Kaeloo, Stumpy, Quack-Quack, and Mr. Cat.
71	19	"Si on jouait au manoir du crime"	Rémi Chapotot	Jean-François Henry	Yani Ouabdesselam	December 19, 2012	June 7, 2013
When the buddies are playing Crime Manor, Stumpy has to find out who murdered Lady Carrot (Pretty). Instead of playing the game the way it's supposed to be played, he launches into a monologue, leaving the others confused.
72	20	"Si on jouait au Q.I. de Moignon"	Rémi Chapotot	Agnès Slimovici	Antoine Ettori	December 20, 2012	June 28, 2013
Stumpy's stupidity winds up getting him killed. He meets the Spirit of Morons, who informs him that he is the "most moronic of all morons". As a reward for being so entertaining, the spirit offers to bring him back to life and grant him one wish. Stumpy wishes that he was a genius instead of a moron. It works, but the rest of the characters now find him very annoying.
73	21	"Si on jouait à cap ou cap"	Rémi Chapotot	Christophe Joaquin; Alexandre Manneville	Yani Ouabdesselam	December 21, 2012	July 5, 2013
The buddies are playing "Can You or Can You", a game in which one player poses a dare to another and the other has to carry it out. When Mr. Cat dares Kaeloo to do the impossible task of transforming without getting angry, Kaeloo's consciousness is sent to another world, and she must perform an incredibly difficult task to get out.
74	22	"Si on jouait à la baballe"	Rémi Chapotot	Yves Coulon	Antoine Ettori	December 22, 2012	July 19, 2013
Stumpy and Mr. Cat play soccer, and they keep trying to beat each other despite being on the same team.
75	23	"Si on jouait au retour vers le super futur"	Rémi Chapotot	Jean-François Henry; Matthieu Choquet	Boris Zaiontchkovsky	December 23, 2012	July 26, 2013
The buddies use their time machine to travel back in time and deal with Quack-Quack's addiction to yogurt. NOTE: First appearance of Prehistorics Kaeloo, Stumpy, and Quack-Quack.
76	24	"Si on jouait au retour vers le super passé"	Rémi Chapotot	Agnès Slimovici	Cédric Guarneri	December 25, 2012	August 7, 2013
Kaeloo, Stumpy and Quack-Quack travel back in time to rescue Mr. Cat, who is trapped in the past due to the events of the previous episode. NOTE: First appearance of Prehistoric Mr. Cat.
77	25	"Si on jouait à la fin du monde"	Rémi Chapotot	Agnès Slimovici	Cédric Guarneri	December 26, 2012	August 14, 2013
Kaeloo suddenly announces to the other buddies that the world will be ending in 24 hours, and they all panic and try to find ways to survive.
78	26	"Si on jouait aux pirates: la malédiction de Gogol-Map"	Rémi Chapotot	Christophe Joaquin; Alexandre Manneville	Antoine Rota	December 27, 2012	August 21, 2013
Kaeloo, as a pirate, recruits the rest of the main four as her crew to find treasure.
79	27	"Si on jouait aux pirates 2: la vengeance de l'empereur"	Rémi Chapotot	Rémi Chapotot	Antoine Rota	December 28, 2012	September 14, 2013
Following the events of the previous episode, the crew run into Stumpy, who has been turned into a cyborg by Olaf. Olaf then sets up a challenge for them, where the first team to find treasure wins the title of "King of Pirates".
80	28	"Si on jouait au beach volley"	Rémi Chapotot	Jean-François Henry	Yani Ouabdesselam	December 29, 2012	September 14, 2013
The buddies are at the beach, so they decide to play beach volleyball. Stumpy tries to improve his performance in the game and Pretty tries to attract Mr. Cat, with the usual results.
81	29	"Si on jouait à la malédiction du pharaon"	Rémi Chapotot	Agnès Slimovici	Antoine Ettori	December 30, 2012	September 21, 2013
Kaeloo, Stumpy, Quack-Quack and Pretty embark on a quest to find the secret of eternal youth.
82	30	"Si on jouait aux top models"	Rémi Chapotot	Angélique Corli	Joan Gouviac	December 31, 2012	October 4, 2013
Pretty launches a new fashion line and says she needs models for it. When Kaeloo auditions to be a model for the fashion line, Pretty makes fun of her looks and refuses to let her join.
83	31	"Si on jouait à la boom"	Rémi Chapotot	Christophe Joaquin	Joan Gouviac	January 1, 2013	October 11, 2013
Kaeloo decides to hold a Valentine's Day party for all of her friends, but Mr. Cat tries to ruin the party, with an ulterior motive.
84	32	"Si on jouait à la sitcom"	Rémi Chapotot	André Manneville	Cédric Guarneri	January 2, 2013	October 18, 2013
The cast make their own sitcom about a family formed of Dad, Kevin, Kelly and Brandon (played by Mr. Cat, Stumpy, Pretty and Quack-Quack respectively) who is harboring Maria, an illegal Mexican immigrant (played by Eugly), and trying to prevent their neighbor Mr. Manchovic (played by Olaf) from finding out.
85	33	"Si on jouait à pierre, feuille, ciseaux"	Rémi Chapotot	César Henry; François Richard	Yani Ouabdesselam	January 3, 2013	November 1, 2013
Stumpy plays Rock, Paper, Scissors against Quack-Quack and Mr. Cat to see who gets to use the bathroom first. Eventually, things escalate and Kaeloo and Mr. Cat wind up having a fight.
86	34	"Si on jouait à la corde à sauter"	Rémi Chapotot	Valentin Papoudof	Yani Ouabdesselam	January 4, 2013	November 15, 2013
Kaeloo forces Mr. Cat to see her psychotherapist, Jean-Guillaume. Meanwhile, in their absence, Stumpy, Quack-Quack, Pretty and Eugly get into a fight over who is better at jump rope, boys or girls.
87	35	"Si on jouait à la course de garçons de café"	Rémi Chapotot	Jean-François Henry	Antoine Ettori	January 5, 2013	November 22, 2013
When the buddies are playing "restaurant", Kaeloo, Stumpy, Quack-Quack and Olaf get into a fight over who gets to be the waiter. They decide to settle it by having a race which involves running while carrying a plate with two glasses and a bottle of wine. The first one to reach the finish line wins, but if anyone drops an object from their plate they are eliminated from the race.
88	36	"Si on jouait aux desperados"	Rémi Chapotot	Jean-François Henry	Cédric Guarneri	January 6, 2013	December 6, 2013
Three desperados, Pecos Marmaduke (Stumpy), Quicksilver (Quack-Quack) and Cat Robertson (Mr. Cat), try to find the Golden Sheep, but they have to deal with Kaeloo, a creepy undertaker. Song Included: Les desperados (+ Reprise)
89	37	"Si on jouait à la comédie musicale"	Rémi Chapotot	Rémi Chapotot	Franck Marchal	January 7, 2013	January 7, 2014
Stumpy sells his soul to the Devil to write a song for Ursula, but Mr. Cat steals the song and uses it to get rich. Songs Included: Ouverture, T'es ma copine, Trouver l'artiste, Je hais ce chat, On arrive en ville, Je veux ma copine
90	38	"Si on jouait à princesse contre princesse"	Rémi Chapotot	Rémi Chapotot	Cédric Guarneri	January 8, 2013	January 14, 2014
Princess Kaeloo and "Princess" Stumpy have a duel, where the winner wins the kingdom and the heart of Prince Quack-Quack.
91	39	"Si on jouait au doublage"	Rémi Chapotot	Jean-François Henry	Yani Ouabdesselam	January 9, 2013	March 1, 2014
Stumpy finds recordings of episodes from the show's first season, and decides to re-dub them. Things quickly go downhill when his friends decide to join in.
92	40	"Si on jouait à destination fatale grave"	Rémi Chapotot	Jean-François Henry	Antoine Ettori	January 10, 2013	March 15, 2014
The buddies start thinking about death, and Stumpy decides to challenge Death head on.
93	41	"Si on jouait aux pompiers"	Rémi Chapotot	Agnès Slimovici	Joan Gouviac	January 11, 2013	March 22, 2014
Kaeloo tries to train Stumpy and Quack-Quack how to be firefighters when she realizes that there are no firefighters in Smileyland.
94	42	"Let's Play School-Run, Work, Bedtime" "(Si on jouait à métro, boulot, dodo)"	Rémi Chapotot	Rémi Chapotot	Antoine Rota	January 11, 2013	March 29, 2014
Kaeloo wants to teach Stumpy and Quack-Quack that being a parent is not as easy as they think it is, so she pretends to be their parent for a day, and Mr. Cat and a few clones of him take on the role of all the annoying people she has to deal with.
95	43	"Si on jouait au baseball"	Rémi Chapotot	Alexandre Manneville	Antoine Rota	January 13, 2013	June 9, 2014
Kaeloo, Mr. Cat and Stumpy (the last of whom considers himself to be an excellent baseball player) play baseball against Quack-Quack, Olaf and Serguei. Realizing that Olaf's team is better than them, Stumpy's team resorts to cheating to win.
96	44	"Si on jouait à Carotte & Co."	Rémi Chapotot	Rémi Chapotot	Yani Ouabdesselam	January 14, 2013	June 10, 2014
Stumpy and Quack-Quack get addicted to carrots, which have the same effect on their bodies as smoking tobacco. This causes Kaeloo to get very annoyed.
97	45	"Si on jouait au karaoké"	Rémi Chapotot	Agnès Slimovici	Antoine Ettori	January 15, 2013	June 11, 2014
When Quack-Quack accidentally swallows a spoon, he develops a marvellous singing voice. It turns out that whatever Quack-Quack sings affects the people and things around him, but it doesn't affect Mr. Cat, who decides to take advantage of it.
98	46	"Si on jouait à saute-mouton"	Rémi Chapotot	Antoine Ettori	Jacob Henry; Pierre Quevaine	January 16, 2013	June 16, 2014
Stumpy comes up with the insane idea that all of Smileyland's sheep are aliens... but his idea might not be so crazy after all.
99	47	"Si on jouait à Game Over: Level 1"	Rémi Chapotot	César Henry; Franck Richard	Antoine Rota	January 17, 2013	June 17, 2014
Stumpy lets Kaeloo play with his new VR game, and she finds out that when playing the game, she can't transform.
100	48	"Si on jouait à Game Over: Level 2"	Rémi Chapotot	César Henry; Franck Richard	Yani Ouabdesselam	January 18, 2013	June 23, 2014
Stumpy, Quack-Quack and Mr. Cat try to get Kaeloo, who is starting to lose her sanity, to stop playing Stumpy's VR game (which she has now been playing non-stop for over a year).
101	49	"Si on jouait aux jeux zérolympiques"	Rémi Chapotot	Rémi Chapotot	Yani Ouabdesselam	January 19, 2013	June 24, 2014
The buddies host a sports event known as the Zerolympic Games, where in each and every event, Quack-Quack wins, Mr. Cat comes in second and Stumpy loses.
102	50	"Si on jouait aux boulettes de papier"	Rémi Chapotot	Alexandre Manneville; Jean-François Henry	Joan Gouviac	January 20, 2013	June 30, 2014
When the buddies are at the library, Stumpy and Mr. Cat find out that if they tear pages from books, crumple them into balls and throw them at people, they turn into book characters for a very short time. They decide to torment Kaeloo and Quack-Quack by doing this to them.
103	51	"Si on jouait à Noël Givré"	Rémi Chapotot	Rémi Chapotot; Jean-François Henry	Yani Ouabdesselam	January 21, 2013	July 19, 2014
When Olaf kidnaps Quack-Quack to harness his powers in a snow-making machine, Kaeloo, Stumpy and Mr. Cat set off to rescue him.
104	52	"Si on jouait à Noël Givré - la suite"	Rémi Chapotot	Rémi Chapotot; Jean-François Henry	Yani Ouabdesselam	January 22, 2013	March 9, 2014
After using Stumpy to distract the robot army, Kaeloo and Mr. Cat get to Olaf's igloo, only to be captured. Song Included: Olga Olga Olga (+ Reprise)

=== Season 3 (2016–18) ===
On March 11, 2016, Télétoon+ picked up Kaeloo and renewed the series for a third season, which was released in France on December 18 of the same year on Télétoon+. The episode "Si on jouait à Gaga du Trône" was released on YouTube on July 21, 2017. It has not yet been dubbed in English.

No. overall	No. in season	French Title	Directed by	Story by	Storyboard by	Original release date	Italy air date
105	1	"Et si on jouait à l'episode très special"	Rémi Chapotot	Rémi Chapotot; Jean-François Henry	Franck Monier; Laura Pennetier; Philippe Rolland	December 18, 2016	October 1, 2018
In the Season 3 premiere, the main four must recreate Smileyland after an argument between Kaeloo and Mr. Cat gets so heated it destroys the planet by venturing to its "heart". Song Included: Je suis comme ça (+ Credits)
106	2	"Si on jouait au vide-grenier"	Rémi Chapotot	Agnès Slimovici	Laura Pennetier	September 4, 2017	October 1, 2018
Kaeloo, Stumpy and Quack-Quack have a garage sale with Mr. Cat as their only customer.
107	3	"Si on jouait à se faire coffrer"	Rémi Chapotot	Agnès Slimovici	Philippe Rolland	September 4, 2017	October 1, 2018
Stumpy and Quack-Quack sign a contract with Mr. Cat to put their yogurt, comic books and Stumpy's phone in a super protected safe-deposit box.
108	4	"Si on jouait à l'espèce supérieur"	Rémi Chapotot	Alexandre Manneville	Franck Monier	September 4, 2017	October 1, 2018
Kaeloo tries to convince everyone that all species are equal, and Mr. Cat tries to convince them that cats are superior to all other species.
109	5	"Si on jouait aux jolis mots"	Rémi Chapotot	Jean-François Henry	Quentin Reubrecht	September 4, 2017	October 1, 2018
Bad Kaeloo tries to learn how to talk properly, using "beautiful words".
110	6	"Si on jouait aux vampires"	Rémi Chapotot	Jean-François Henry	Laura Pennetier	September 4, 2017	October 1, 2018
Stumpy wants to become a vampire. Song Included: Le rap des vampires
111	7	"Si on jouait à la TV trop jolie"	Rémi Chapotot	Alexandre Manneville	Boris Zaïon	September 4, 2017	October 1, 2018
The main four make their own TV channel called "Very Pretty TV", where each and every show winds up being ruined by aliens.
112	8	"Si on jouait à la petite entreprise"	Rémi Chapotot	Christophe Joaquin	Quentin Reubrecht	September 4, 2017	October 1, 2018
Kaeloo must stop Mr. Cat, Stumpy and Quack-Quack from running a corrupt business.
113	9	"Si on jouait à procès de Moignon"	Rémi Chapotot	Jean-François Henry	Franck Monier	September 4, 2017	October 1, 2018
Kaeloo takes Stumpy to court, with Quack-Quack as the judge and Mr. Cat as Stumpy's lawyer, for "mistreating" random objects such as the TV, the fridge, a laptop and his own video game console. Song Included: Tous ces objets
114	10	"Si on jouait au mouton vote"	Rémi Chapotot	Gabriel Grandjouan	Quentin Reubrecht	September 5, 2017	October 1, 2018
Smileyland holds an election for president, and even the sheep are allowed to vote. To Kaeloo's chagrin, everyone wants to vote for Mr. Cat.
115	11	"Si on jouait à la barbichette"	Rémi Chapotot	Christophe Joaquin	Boris Zaïon	September 5, 2017	October 1, 2018
The main four are playing Barbichette, but it soon becomes clear that making Quack-Quack laugh isn't very easy.
116	12	"Si on jouait à chercher Ursula... désespérément"	Rémi Chapotot	Christophe Joaquin	Laura Pannetier	September 5, 2017	October 1, 2018
Kaeloo tries to find Ursula's whereabouts on Stumpy's birthday.
117	13	"Si on jouait au réchauffement climatique"	Rémi Chapotot	Peter Berts	Laura Pannetier	September 5, 2017	October 1, 2018
Kaeloo tries to help Olaf and a group of sentient refrigerators deal with global warming.
118	14	"Si on jouait à je te like"	Rémi Chapotot	Alexandre Manneville	Boris Zaïon	September 5, 2017	October 1, 2018
The gang and Pretty get into a prank war instigated by Pretty taking embarrassing pictures of them and putting them on Fakebook.
119	15	"Si on jouait à la porte"	Rémi Chapotot	Jean-François Henry	Quentin Reubrecht	September 5, 2017	October 1, 2018
Stumpy brings up several interdimensional doors around Smileyland.
120	16	"Si on jouait à la reine des corsaires"	Rémi Chapotot	Florian Falcucci	Boris Zaïon	September 5, 2017	October 1, 2018
Kaeloo, Stumpy and Quack-Quack face off against Mr. Cat and Pretty in a pirate battle.
121	17	"Si on jouait à l'entretien d'embauche"	Rémi Chapotot	Christophe Joaquin	Philippe Rolland	September 6, 2017	October 1, 2018
Kaeloo, Stumpy, Quack-Quack and Mr. Cat go for a job interview with Olaf after they are informed that they have been fired from the show.
122	18	"Si on jouait aux contes de fées, la sequelle"	Rémi Chapotot	Alexandre Manneville	Laura Pennetier	September 6, 2017	October 1, 2018
Kaeloo tries to tell bedtime stories to Stumpy and Quack-Quack; fearing that her fairy tales aren't going to prepare the two to face the world when they grow up, Mr. Cat interrupts each story and makes suggestions to make it more realistic.
123	19	"Si on jouait à l'au-delà"	Rémi Chapotot	Jean-François Henry	Laura Pannetier	September 6, 2017	October 1, 2018
Kaeloo takes Stumpy and Quack-Quack on a field trip to the afterlife, while Mr. Cat stays home since he doesn't believe in the afterlife. Songs Included: Au paradis, La pesée des âmes, Chez les hindous
124	20	"Si on jouait aux gladiateurs télépathes"	Rémi Chapotot	Franck Richard	Franck Monier	September 6, 2017	October 1, 2018
Stumpy and Quack-Quack get a new game which allows them to play gladiator-style inside their minds.
125	21	"Si on jouait à Gaga du Trône"	Rémi Chapotot	Jacob Henry; Franck Richard	Philippe Rolland	September 6, 2017	October 1, 2018
Stumpy proclaims himself as the "king of the bathroom", locks himself inside and takes the toilet as his "throne". This proves problematic for Kaeloo, who badly needs to use the bathroom.
126	22	"Si on jouait à il fait quoi ton père?"	Rémi Chapotot	Valentin Papoudof	Quentin Reubrecht	September 6, 2017	October 1, 2018
The main four talk to each other about their fathers. However, instead of telling the truth, they make up convoluted, bizarre stories.
127	23	"Si on jouait à la mythologie"	Rémi Chapotot	Jacob Henry; Franck Richard	Boris Zaïon	September 6, 2017	October 1, 2018
Zeus (played by Kaeloo), with the help of Hermes (played by Quack-Quack) sets out to save the souls of Olympus' flowers after Hades (played by Mr. Cat) takes them away. Meanwhile, Stumpy has trouble figuring out whether to play Apollo or Artemis.
128	24	"Si on jouait à la cour des miracles"	Rémi Chapotot	Jean-François Henry	Quentin Reubrecht	September 6, 2017	October 1, 2018
Stumpy tries to scam people so he can get money to pay for a new Mr. Coolskin video game.
129	25	"Si on jouait à va pas te coucher"	Rémi Chapotot	Agnès Slimovici	Franck Monier	September 6, 2017	October 1, 2018
Kaeloo, Stumpy, Quack-Quack and Mr. Cat try to stay up late at night so they can see a shooting star and wish on it.
130	26	"Si on jouait à garçons-filles"	Rémi Chapotot	Agnès Slimovici	Boris Zaïon	September 7, 2017	October 1, 2018
Kaeloo tries to teach her friends the difference between boys and girls, but it proves to be difficult since none of them embody gender stereotypes.
131	27	"Si on jouait à garder la sourire"	Rémi Chapotot	Jacob Henry; Franck Richard	Franck Monier	September 7, 2017	October 1, 2018
The residents of Smileyland have a smiling contest.
132	28	"Si on jouait à avoir de nouveaux amis"	Rémi Chapotot	Peter Berts	Laura Pannetier	September 7, 2017	October 1, 2018
The sheep ask if they can be friends with the main four. Kaeloo, Stumpy and Quack-Quack agree. Mr. Cat, however, is not on board with the idea of having them for friends, and the others must stop him from turning the sheep into mechoui.
133	29	"Si on jouait à jetset vs. jahjah"	Rémi Chapotot	Agnès Slimovici	Quentin Reubrecht	September 7, 2017	October 1, 2018
Pretty throws a party and invites everybody in Smileyland except Kaeloo. Songs Included: Soyez vous-vous, Feu de camp
134	30	"Si on jouait à se répliquer"	Rémi Chapotot	Alexandre Manneville	Quentin Reubrecht	September 7, 2017	October 1, 2018
When everyone is too busy doing their own things to play with Stumpy, he wishes for friends with the same interests as him and is granted several clones of himself.
135	31	"Si on jouait à faire des économies"	Rémi Chapotot	Peter Berts	Franck Monier	September 7, 2017	October 1, 2018
The main four try to reduce the amount of money spent on the show's budget.
136	32	"Si on jouait à l'école des mythos"	Rémi Chapotot	Agnès Slimovici	Boris Zaïon	September 7, 2017	October 1, 2018
Kaeloo's honesty offends her friends, so Mr. Cat decides to teach her how to tell lies.
137	33	"Si on jouait au chasseur"	Rémi Chapotot	Valentin Papoudof	Laura Pannetier	September 7, 2017	October 1, 2018
When the main four play a game called "Hunter", Mr. Cat shows the others an exhibition on the history of the game.
138	34	"Si on jouait à être psycho-retape"	Rémi Chapotot	Peter Berts	Franck Monier	September 8, 2017	October 1, 2018
Mr. Cat thinks that Stumpy may have dyspraxia. Kaeloo thinks Stumpy is just lazy. In order to find out who's right, Mr. Cat gives Stumpy a few psychological tests.
139	35	"Si on jouait à la vie privée de Ratman"	Rémi Chapotot	Florian Falcucci	Laura Pannetier	September 8, 2017	October 1, 2018
A superhero named Ratman (played by Stumpy), his sidekick Robquack (played by Quack-Quack) and their butler Calfred (played by Mr. Cat), must deal with an annoying and nosy neighbor (played by Kaeloo) while a supervillain named Frosted Penguin (played by Olaf) tries to attack them.
140	36	"Si on jouait aux sorcières trop mignonnes"	Rémi Chapotot	Christophe Joaquin	Boris Zaïon	March 9, 2018	October 1, 2018
Kaeloo, Stumpy, and Quack-Quack are pretending to be sorcerers, but one of their trivial pranks prompts Mr. Cat to seek revenge on them.
141	37	"Si on jouait à Voice Academy"	Rémi Chapotot	Rémi Chapotot	Philippe Rolland	March 9, 2018	October 1, 2018
The main four go on a reality TV singing competition called "Voice Academy", which is judged by Pretty, Eugly, Olaf, and a sheep. Kaeloo gets eliminated because her singing is terrible, but each time she gets kicked out of the studio, she keeps breaking in again and again to make the judges change their minds, hindering the progress of the show. Songs Included: La nature, Moi, j'm'appelle Moignon, La chanson de Mr. Chat
142	38	"Si on jouait aux journalistes d'investigation"	Rémi Chapotot	Julien Guizard; Jacob Henry	Quentin Reubrecht	March 9, 2018	October 1, 2018
Kaeloo asks Stumpy, Quack-Quack and Mr. Cat to get a scoop for a newspaper. They decide to do one about her.
143	39	"Si on jouait à jouer dans le noir"	Rémi Chapotot	Rémi Chapotot	Boris Zaïon	March 9, 2018	October 1, 2018
Stumpy reveals to his friends that he is afraid of the dark, so they try to help him get over it.
144	40	"Si on jouait à vroum vroum"	Rémi Chapotot	Peter Berts	Philippe Rolland	March 9, 2018	October 1, 2018
Stumpy and Quack-Quack racing cars.
145	41	"Si on jouait à la gueguerre"	Rémi Chapotot	Jacob Henry; Julien Guizard	Philippe Rolland	March 10, 2018	October 1, 2018
When her friends want to play war, Kaeloo introduces them to a game which incolves strategically planning a war between kingdoms. Things go rather badly as Quack-Quack has been possessed by a demon and is hurting his friends.
146	42	"Si on jouait à téléphone très smart"	Rémi Chapotot	Christophe Joaquin	Franck Monier	March 10, 2018	October 1, 2018
Stumpy tries to show Kaeloo the many uses of smartphones.
147	43	"Si on jouait à sauver la banquise"	Rémi Chapotot	Rémi Chapotot	Laura Pannetier	March 10, 2018	October 1, 2018
Olaf finds out that the ice caps are about to melt and flood Smileyland, so he gets the main four to sing a song about saving the ice caps so that he can publicize it and people will put in efforts to ensure that the ice caps won't melt. Song Included: Il faut sauver la banquise
148	44	"Si on jouait avec Eugly"	Rémi Chapotot	Agnès Slimovici	Laura Pannetier	March 10, 2018	October 1, 2018
Stumpy and Mr. Cat worry that Quack-Quack's relationship with Eugly is ruining their friendship with him, so they plot to make the couple break up.
149	45	"Si on jouait à être fan"	Rémi Chapotot	Rémi Chapotot	Philippe Rolland	March 10, 2018	October 1, 2018
Stumpy has his knowledge of Mr. Coolskin stolen by a double from another dimension. Pretty and Eugly train with Kaeloo in an effort to get it back. NOTE: This is the first episode where Quack-Quack and Mr. Cat don't make an appearance.
150	46	"Si on jouait à chuis trop mad"	Rémi Chapotot	Franck Richard; Jacob Henry	Franck Monier	March 10, 2018	October 1, 2018
The friends show a movie trailer. While Kaeloo wants to make a deep and sensitive film, everyone wants a fight. NOTE: This episode parodies the Mad Max movies.

=== Season 4 (2019–20) ===
The fourth season of the show premiered on October 7, 2019 in Italy and December 25, 2019 in France. It has not yet been dubbed in English.

No. overall	No. in season	French Title	Directed by	Story by	Storyboard by	Original release date	Italy air date
151	1	"Si on jouait à la lettre"	Rémi Chapotot	Jean-François Henry	Philippe Rolland	December 25, 2019	October 7, 2019
A letter arrives in Smileyland, but the addressee's name is not written on it. Kaeloo, Stumpy, Mr. Cat, and Pretty try to find out who the letter was meant for.
152	2	"Si on jouait à la forêt à fessée"	Rémi Chapotot	Jean-François Henry	Philippe Rolland	December 25, 2019	October 7, 2019
In a fantasy-themed adventure, Kaeloo, Stumpy, Quack-Quack, Mr. Cat, and Pretty must save Eugly from Olaf.
153	3	"Si on jouait aux cartes"	Rémi Chapotot	Jean-François Henry	Pierre le Couviour	December 25, 2019	October 7, 2019
The main four play cards, but Stumpy's inability to choose which card to throw is hindering the game's progress.
154	4	"Si on jouait à Voice Academy 2"	Rémi Chapotot	Rémi Chapotot	Philippe Rolland	December 25, 2019	October 7, 2019
Voice Academy has its finale episode. Songs Included: La chanson de la Guetto Family, Iceberg mortel, Combien de temps
155	5	"Si on jouait aux agents immobiliers"	Rémi Chapotot	Peter Berts	Quentin Reubrecht	December 25, 2019	October 7, 2019
Olaf is looking for a new house for himself and his family.
156	6	"Si on jouait à cupidon.com"	Rémi Chapotot	Jean-François Henry	Pierre le Couviour	December 25, 2019	October 7, 2019
Pretty tries to use a love potion on Mr. Cat, but her plans go awry when the potion makes him fall in love with a soda can instead.
157	7	"Si on jouait aux amis imaginaires"	Rémi Chapotot	Jean-François Henry	Pierre le Couviour	December 25, 2019	October 7, 2019
Kaeloo, Mr. Cat, and Pretty tell Stumpy that imaginary friends aren't real. Once he finds out that they have imaginary friends too, he sets out to catch them on camera and expose them to the world.
158	8	"Si on jouait à silence, on tourne"	Rémi Chapotot	Rémi Chapotot; Jean-François Henry	Boris Zaiontchkovsky	December 25, 2019	October 7, 2019
Smileyland falls into disrepair, so Kaeloo tries to direct a movie to raise funds to renovate the place.
159	9	"Si on jouait au mauvaise élève"	Rémi Chapotot	Agnès Slimovici	Johanna Huck	December 25, 2019	October 7, 2019
Kaeloo and Mr. Cat make a bet on whether Kaeloo is capable of being a bad student or not. Song Included: On va jouer à apprendre
160	10	"Si on jouait à la patinage artistique"	Rémi Chapotot	Jean-François Henry	Johanna Huck	December 25, 2019	October 7, 2019
Olaf forces the main four to change summer time to winter time. While he hosts a figure skating competition, Mr. Cat plots to change it back and never let winter come back again.
161	11	"Si on jouait à l'Escape Room"	Rémi Chapotot	Franck Richard	Pierre le Couviour	December 25, 2019	October 7, 2019
The main four wake up inside an escape room with no explanation. They must find a way out in six minutes or Quack-Quack will go insane from the lack of yogurt and kill them all.
162	12	"Si on jouait à devine mon job"	Rémi Chapotot	Peter Berts	Johanna Huck	December 25, 2019	October 7, 2019
A sheep named Jean-Raoul goes on a game show where Kaeloo, Stumpy, Quack-Quack, and Mr. Cat enact various jobs and he must figure out which occupation they each belong to.
163	13	"Si on jouait à symphonie en rire majeur"	Rémi Chapotot	Rémi Chapotot	Philippe Rolland	December 25, 2019	October 7, 2019
Kaeloo teaches Stumpy and Quack-Quack how people used to laugh in ancient times.
164	14	"Si on jouait pour gagner"	Rémi Chapotot	Rémi Chapotot	Boris Zaiontchkovsky	December 25, 2019	October 7, 2019
Mr. Cat trains Kaeloo to finally be able to win at a game against Quack-Quack.
165	15	"Si on jouait au coffre mystérieux"	Rémi Chapotot	Jean-François Henry	Johanna Huck	December 25, 2019	October 7, 2019
The main four go searching for a wooden chest to play a game with. Song Included: Un jour par an
166	16	"Si on jouait à créer le besoin"	Rémi Chapotot	Franck Richard; Jean-François Henry	Quentin Reubrecht	December 25, 2019	October 7, 2019
Mr. Cat creates an advertising campaign to convince the sheep to eat yogurt instead of grass. Song Included: Super Super (Le yaourt c'est la win)
167	17	"Si on jouait à ni oui ni non ni banane"	Rémi Chapotot	Jean-François Henry	Johanna Huck	December 25, 2019	October 7, 2019
Mr. Cat gets the rest of the main four to play a game where they have to go the whole day without saying the word "banana".
168	18	"Si on jouait à la rédaction"	Rémi Chapotot	Peter Berts	Quentin Reubrecht	December 25, 2019	October 7, 2019
The main four participate in a writing contest for which the prompt is "What is your biggest dream?"
169	19	"Si on jouait aux belles histoires de Mr. Chat"	Rémi Chapotot	Jacob Henry	Pierre le Couviour	December 25, 2019	October 7, 2019
Mr. Cat decides to tell a whole bunch of legends, all about a certain crapus musculus.
170	20	"Si on jouait à la mère Noël"	Rémi Chapotot	Agnès Slimovici	Pierre le Couviour	December 25, 2019	October 7, 2019
Kaeloo tells the story of how Mrs. Claus saved Christmas.
171	21	"Si on jouait à t'es pas net"	Rémi Chapotot	Rémi Chapotot	Johanna Huck	January 6, 2020	October 7, 2019
Kaeloo, Mr. Cat, and Quack-Quack come to spend time in Stumpy's room while the latter is on his computer.
172	22	"Si on jouait à l'enquête délicate"	Rémi Chapotot	Jean-François Henry	Quentin Reubrecht	January 6, 2020	October 7, 2019
Kaeloo discovers with closure the gules gules drawn on a cabinet door. She decides to investigate to find out who is responsible when everyone says they are guilty.
173	23	"Si on jouait aux histoires de fantômes"	Rémi Chapotot	Jean-François Henry	Philippe Rolland	January 6, 2020	October 7, 2019
Kaeloo, Mr. Cat, Stumpy and Quack-Quack tell ghost stories around a campfire.
174	24	"Si on jouait à suikidikiyé"	Rémi Chapotot	Franck Richard; Jean-François Henry	Pierre le Couviour	January 6, 2020	October 7, 2019
To forgive themselves for their mistake, the fairies of Stumpy offer him the suikidikiyé wand, which allows the floodgates to be sent back to the sender.
175	25	"Si on jouait à super vegan"	Rémi Chapotot	Agnès Slimovici	Johanna Huck	January 6, 2020	October 7, 2019
Kaeloo tries to force everyone to go vegan.
176	26	"Si on jouait à mécano quantique"	Rémi Chapotot	Franck Richard; Jean-François Henry	Philippe Rolland	January 6, 2020	October 7, 2019
Stumpy and Kaeloo wonder what quantum mechanics is, and go to question the other inhabitants of Smileyland. Song Included: C'est du quantique
177	27	"Si on jouait à la kousinade"	Rémi Chapotot	Rémi Chapotot; Jean-François Henry	Johanna Huck	January 6, 2020	October 7, 2019
Kaeloo invites her cousin Kevin to Smileyland, but Kevin arrives with Kurt and Karl, and things don't go as planned.
178	28	"Si on jouait à gratte-moi si tu peux"	Rémi Chapotot	Jean-François Henry	Quentin Reubrecht	January 6, 2020	October 7, 2019
Stumpy learns what a louse is and decides he absolutely wants one, despite everyone's warnings.
179	29	"Si on jouait aux moutons avocats"	Rémi Chapotot	Agnès Slimovici	Pierre le Couviour	January 6, 2020	October 7, 2019
Mr. and Ms. Baa, two sheep, take up the defense of the inhabitants of Smileyland who claim to be subject to Kaeloo.
180	30	"Si on jouait à la diplomate de l'amour"	Rémi Chapotot	Jean-François Henry	Johanna Huck	January 6, 2020	October 7, 2019
After Quack-Quack and Eugly break up, Kaeloo and Pretty give them advice on how to get back together.
181	31	"Si on jouait au train du dodo"	Rémi Chapotot	Rémi Chapotot	Johanna Huck	January 6, 2020	October 7, 2019
Kaeloo, Stumpy, Quack-Quack and Mr. Cat take the dodo train which takes them to the land of dreams.
182	32	"Si on jouait à cartoon sinon rien"	Rémi Chapotot	Agnès Slimovici	Pierre le Couviour	January 6, 2020	October 7, 2019
After having a nightmare, Kaeloo decides that the series needs to become more realistic and less cartoonish.
183	33	"Si on jouait à faire des histoires"	Rémi Chapotot	Jean-François Henry	Johanna Huck	January 6, 2020	October 7, 2019
Kaeloo offers Mr. Cat, Quack-Quack and Stumpy to create a story together in the manner of the exquisite corpse, by saying a sentence each in turn.
184	34	"Si on jouait au pays trop parfait"	Rémi Chapotot	Agnès Slimovici	Pierre le Couviour	January 6, 2020	October 7, 2019
Kaeloo takes Stumpy, Quack-Quack, and Mr. Cat to Perfectland, an alternate version of Smileyland, to teach them about perfection.
185	35	"Si on jouait à la commedia dell'arte"	Rémi Chapotot	Jean-François Henry	Quentin Reubrecht	January 6, 2020	October 7, 2019
All the friends except Olaf (who is in the audience) put on a "commedia dell'arte" theater show. Songs Included: Marions les amoureux, La danse du coup coup de pied au cul-cul
186	36	"Si on jouait à en voir de toutes les couleurs"	Rémi Chapotot	Agnès Slimovici	Johanna Huck	January 6, 2020	October 7, 2019
Kaeloo and Olaf face off in a game and use the sheep as soldiers. In order to distinguish the two camps, the two agree to paint the sheep in different colors.
187	37	"Si on jouait au déménagement de Ratman"	Rémi Chapotot	Peter Berts	Quentin Reubrecht	January 6, 2020	October 7, 2019
Superhero Ratman and his roommate Robquack are moving house.
188	38	"Si on jouait aux têtes en boîtes"	Rémi Chapotot	Peter Berts	Quentin Reubrecht	January 6, 2020	October 7, 2019
The friends take part in a game show under the gaze of the director of management, inspired by the game "Who is it?".
189	39	"Si on jouait au génie de l'ordi"	Rémi Chapotot	Franck Richard	Pierre le Couviour	January 6, 2020	October 7, 2019
Kaeloo wants to play Aladdin but there is not enough money to do so. The friends therefore make a modern remake of the tale.
190	40	"Si on jouait à Mr Mout et les neuneus"	Rémi Chapotot	Peter Berts	Pierre le Couviour	January 6, 2020	October 7, 2019
Mr. Cat is making his own series called "Mr. Sheepy and the Dorks", which copies the Kaeloo series. Kaeloo hates the show.
191	41	"Si on jouait au multiversaire"	Rémi Chapotot	Agnès Slimovici	Johanna Huck	January 6, 2020	October 7, 2019
When Kaeloo discovers that Stumpy hasn't celebrated his birthday since he was 5 years old, she decides to organize a "multiversary" for him to celebrate all his birthdays at once.
192	42	"Si on jouait à l'astre au logis"	Rémi Chapotot	Franck Richard	Quentin Reubrecht	January 6, 2020	October 7, 2019
Kaeloo tries to teach Stumpy how the universe and gravity work because all his knowledge on the subject is wrong.
193	43	"Si on jouait à faut que ça ruisselle"	Rémi Chapotot	Rémi Chapotot	Pierre le Couviour	January 6, 2020	October 7, 2019
Stumpy asks Kaeloo for money to buy sneakers. Since she doesn't have one and doesn't know how to get one, the two ask Mr. Cat for help. Songs Included: Faut que ça ruisselle, Faut qu'on s'aime, Faut que ça Coin-Coin
194	44	"Si on jouait à questions réponses"	Rémi Chapotot	Franck Richard; Jean-François Henry	Johanna Huck	January 6, 2020	October 7, 2019
Kaeloo presents a talk show and invites the other characters, who act as if they are actors from the show.
195	45	"Si on jouait aux modos"	Rémi Chapotot	Rémi Chapotot	Philippe Rolland	January 6, 2020	October 7, 2019
Kaeloo discovers that people say bad words on the internet. She and the others then become moderators to ban these users in order to make the internet less violent.
196	46	"Si on jouait à la boucle infernale"	Rémi Chapotot	Rémi Chapotot; Jean-François Henry	Pierre le Couviour	January 6, 2020	October 7, 2019
Stumpy invites Kaeloo and Quack-Quack to his house to play the infernal loop, a game that consists of calling someone and getting on the answering machine, waiting for the other to call back so that they also get on the answering machine and so on, resulting in an endless chain of calls.
197	47	"Si on jouait au grand livre du destin"	Rémi Chapotot	Peter Berts	Quentin Reubrecht	January 6, 2020	October 7, 2019
Kaeloo tells the friends about a book capable of revealing the past and the future, and they decide to go and consult it.
198	48	"Si on jouait à la saga du Greul chapitre 1"	Rémi Chapotot	Rémi Chapotot	Pierre le Couviour	January 6, 2020	October 7, 2019
Junior learns that he is the descendant of the Stumpy line, the protectors of the Greul, a magical artifact that can make anything he draws come true.
199	49	"Si on jouait à la saga du Greul chapitre 2"	Rémi Chapotot	Rémi Chapotot	Philippe Rolland	January 6, 2020	October 7, 2019
Mr. Bounty Hunter and Junior have taken refuge in a hotel, but are quickly found by Dark Quack and his soldiers.
200	50	"Si on jouait à la saga du Greul chapitre 3"	Rémi Chapotot	Rémi Chapotot	Johanna Huck	January 6, 2020	October 7, 2019
Junior goes in search of the artifact capable of countering the Greul's powers in order to take it back from Empress Pretty. Song Included: À moi le Greul
201	51	"Si on jouait à jouer toute seule"	Rémi Chapotot	Rémi Chapotot	Johanna Huck	January 6, 2020	October 7, 2019
Kaeloo finds herself alone in Smileyland because everyone is busy elsewhere.
202	52	"Si on jouait à faire un épisode"	Rémi Chapotot	Rémi Chapotot	Pierre le Couviour	January 6, 2020	October 7, 2019
The friends explain how the creation of an episode of Kaeloo goes.

=== Season 5 (2023) ===
The first two episodes of the season were released on MyCanal on April 1, 2023, followed by the rest of the season on April 9. The fifth season premiered on April 8, 2023, after originally being announced on June 15, 2021 and slated for release in January 2022 and January 2023. It has been dubbed in English; the episodes are currently on their way to syndication in English-speaking countries. The voice actors for the dub are uncredited.

No. overall	No. in season	Title (French title bottom)	Directed by	Story by	Storyboard by	Original release date
203	1	"Let's Play by the Rules"	Rémi Chapotot	Rémi Chapotot	Philippe Rolland	April 8, 2023
203	1	"Let's Play with Game Rule"	Rémi Chapotot	Rémi Chapotot	Philippe Rolland	April 8, 2023
A newcomer bursts in: Game Rule. NOTE: First appearance of Game Rule.
204	2	"Let's Play Find the Cat!" "(Si on jouait à chat perdu)"	Rémi Chapotot	Jacob Henry	Philipp Merten	April 8, 2023
Mr. Cat surprises himself by being nice and goes into an existential crisis; who is he really?
205	3	"Let's Play with Vitamin" "(Si on jouait avec Vitamine)"	Rémi Chapotot	Agnès Slimovici	Mélanie Lopez	April 8, 2023
Stumpy introduces Vitamin (Vitamine), one of his sisters, whose particularity is being hyperactive to the point where she can't interact with the normal world. Stumpy is distressed not to be able to communicate with his sister and asks Quack-Quack for help. NOTE: First appearance of Vitamin (Vitamine).
206	4	"Let's Play with Homework" "(Si on jouait à... bien faire)"	Rémi Chapotot	Peter Berts	Valérie Buchholzer	April 8, 2023
Stumpy needs help with his homework. His friends try to help him using what he loves most in the world: video games.
207	5	"Let's Play Grazing Galore" "(Si on jouait au goût des champs)"	Rémi Chapotot	Peter Berts	Mélanie Lopez	April 8, 2023
Game Rule seeks to regulate the taste of the pastures and Kaeloo convinces her to ask for the opinions of those most affected: the sheep. Seeking an outside opinion, Game Rule also asks for the participation of Stumpy, whose wacky ideas are not necessarily appreciated by the sheep.
208	6	"Let's Play Funny Contest" "(Si on jouait à être drôle)"	Rémi Chapotot	Peter Berts	Valérie Buchholzer	April 8, 2023
Stumpy, Quack-Quack and Mr. Cat tell Kaeloo that she isn't as funny as Game Rule. Kaeloo challenges Game Rule to a comedy contest to prove her friends wrong.
209	7	"Let's Play with Me-Me" "(Si on jouait avec Nombril)"	Rémi Chapotot	Rémi Chapotot; Jean-François Henry	Valérie Buchholzer	April 8, 2023
Stumpy goes "survival trekking" with Kaeloo and Quack-Quack, and his annoying little sister Me-Me (Nombril) tags along. Game Rule wants to make the game more dangerous to fit the survival game, and Me-Me (Nombril) won't stop endangering herself in her attempts to get Stumpy's attention. NOTE: First appearance of Me-Me (Nombril).
210	8	"Let's Play Karma Quiz" "(Si on jouait au karma quizz)"	Rémi Chapotot	Jacob Henry	Philipp Merten	April 8, 2023
Mr. Cat hosts a game show called "Karma Quiz", where the goal is to earn as much good karma as possible (bad karma receives unforeseen consequences).
211	9	"Let's Play Is That Art?" "(Si on jouait aux règles de l'art)"	Rémi Chapotot	Jacob Henry	Sarah Salard	April 9, 2023
TBA.
212	10	"Let's Play Cosmic Lawn Bowling" "(Si on jouait à la pétanque cosmique)"	Rémi Chapotot	Peter Berts	Valérie Buchholzer	April 9, 2023
TBA.
213	11	"Let's Play Run, Rumor! Run!" "(Si on jouait à... cours, rumeur! Cours!)"	Rémi Chapotot	Agnès Slimovici	Philipp Merten	April 9, 2023
TBA.
214	12	"Let's Play with Lavenblah" "(Si on jouait avec... Lavanade)"	Rémi Chapotot	Jacob Henry	Philipp Merten	April 9, 2023
Stumpy introduces his friends to his sister Lavenblah (Lavanade), who has supernatural powers. Stumpy thinks that these powers are "weird", so he asks Quack-Quack to help Lavenblah (Lavanade) control her powers in an effort to make her "normal". NOTE: First appearance of Lavenblah (Lavanade).
215	13	"Let's Play It's Coming" "(Si on jouait avant... que ça arrive)"	Rémi Chapotot	Peter Berts	Mélanie Lopez	April 9, 2023
After seeing a sheep running and screaming "It's coming!" in a panicked tone, the main four wonder what he might have been talking about. Mr. Cat thinks that a catastrophe is coming and starts to spread panic among the residents of Smileyland, which irks Kaeloo, who believes that the thing that's coming will be a pleasant surprise and that Mr. Cat is being a pessimist.
216	14	"Let's Play Blind Man's Bluff" "(Si on jouait à colin-maillard)"	Rémi Chapotot	Jacob Henry	Johanna Huck	April 9, 2023
Mr. Cat tricks Kaeloo into making Game Rule show up to a game of Blind Man's Buff. Game Rule tries to make the game less "discriminatory" by making the main four play the game using different rules until she finds a satisfactory solution.
217	15	"Let's Play Connect the Friends" "(Si on jouait chacun de son côté)"	Rémi Chapotot	Peter Berts	Valérie Buchholzer	April 10, 2023
Game Rule tries to teach a lesson to the main four in a classroom, but Stumpy and Quack-Quack keep disturbing the lesson with their jokes. She tries to separate them to prevent them from causing further trouble, but the task is not as simple as it seems.
218	16	"Let's Play Quality Time" "(Si on jouait avec qualité)"	Rémi Chapotot	Peter Berts	Johanna Huck	April 10, 2023
Kaeloo angers Quack-Quack and Mr. Cat by interfering in their roughhousing and tries to make it up to them.
219	17	"Let's Play Against Moldie" "(Si on jouait contre Cramoisie)"	Rémi Chapotot	Agnès Slimovici	Johanna Huck	April 10, 2023
The main four play a game of "zompires" (a portmanteau of zombies and vampires) with Stumpy's rude little sister, Moldie (Cramoisie). NOTE: First appearance of Moldie (Cramoisie).
220	18	"Let's Play I Have an Idea" "(Si on jouait à avoir des idées, ou pas, ou plus)"	Rémi Chapotot	Agnès Slimovici	Valérie Buchholzer	April 10, 2023
Pretty tells Stumpy to tell his ideas "germinate" instead of acting on them immediately, so that he'll have time to think about them. Stumpy misinterprets this to mean that he should literally plant his ideas in the ground.
221	19	"Let's Play the Mrs. Claus Contest" "(Si on jouait au concours des Mère Noël)"	Rémi Chapotot	Agnès Slimovici	Mélanie Lopez	April 10, 2023
TBA.
222	20	"Let's Play Movie Magic - Act I" "(Si on jouait au cinéma)"	Rémi Chapotot	Peter Berts	Valérie Buchholzer	April 10, 2023
TBA.
223	21	"Let's Play Movie Magic - Act II" "(Si on jouait au cinéma, la suite)"	Rémi Chapotot	Peter Berts	Rémi Chapotot; Jean-François Henry	April 10, 2023
TBA.
224	22	"Let's Play with Checkout" "(Si on jouait avec Ardoise)"	Rémi Chapotot	Agnès Slimovici	Mélanie Lopez	April 10, 2023
Stumpy wants to buy a gift for Ursula, but he doesn't have enough money. His sister Checkout (Ardoise), who is good with finances, steps in to lend a hand. NOTE: First appearance of Checkout (Ardoise).
225	23	"Let's Play My, How You've Changed!" "(Si on jouait à vous avez changé)"	Rémi Chapotot	Agnès Slimovici	Mélanie Lopez; Valérie Buchholzer	April 11, 2023
Through song, the characters describe their many changes and development with glee, except for Mr. Cat and Game Rule, who wish for things to stay the same.
226	24	"Let's Play Don't Get Cancelled" "(Si on jouait à l'exercice de style)"	Rémi Chapotot	Peter Berts	Philipp Merten	April 11, 2023
Kaeloo must show the show's producer a montage of clips from previous episodes to gain his approval for a sixth season and not cease to exist, and is told by Game Rule that her chances of success will improve if she shows the producer G-rated content that's "just like every other kids' show". Kaeloo goes overboard with censoring her montage, such as cutting out gentle slapstick comedy because it supposedly has the potential to severely traumatize kids.
227	25	"Let's Play with Snitchy" "(Si on jouait avec Poucave?)"	Rémi Chapotot	Jacob Henry	Mélanie Lopez	April 11, 2023
TBA. NOTE: First appearance of Snitchy (Poucave).
228	26	"Let's Play Urgent Message" "(Si on jouait aux messagers)"	Rémi Chapotot	Peter Berts	Sarah Salard	April 11, 2023
TBA.
229	27	"Let's Play Whackadoodle Day" "(Si on jouait à la fête des fous-fous)"	Rémi Chapotot	Agnès Slimovici	Valérie Buchholzer	April 11, 2023
TBA.
230	28	"Let's Play Like a Team" "(Si on jouait tous ensemble)"	Rémi Chapotot	Peter Berts	Philipp Merten	April 11, 2023
TBA.
231	29	"Let's Play Sock Hunt" "(Si on jouait à la chasse aux chaussettes)"	Rémi Chapotot	Rémi Chapotot	Mélanie Lopez	April 11, 2023
TBA.
232	30	"Let's Play with Purplish" "(Si on jouait avec Violasse)"	Rémi Chapotot	Agnès Slimovici	Philippe Rolland	April 11, 2023
TBA. NOTE: First appearance of Purplish (Violasse).
233	31	"Let's Play Hunt the Frog" "(Si on jouait à la chasse à la grenouille)"	Rémi Chapotot	Jacob Henry	Philipp Merten	April 12, 2023
TBA.
234	32	"Let's Play the Question of Love" "(Si on jouait à l'interrogation)"	Rémi Chapotot	Agnès Slimovici	Valérie Buchholzer	April 12, 2023
TBA.
235	33	"The Origin of Quack-Quack" "(Les origines de Coin-Coin)"	Rémi Chapotot	Rémi Chapotot	Johanna Huck	April 12, 2023
TBA.
236	34	"Let's Play the Tell-All" "(Si on jouait à tout se dire)"	Rémi Chapotot	Rémi Chapotot	Sarah Salard	April 12, 2023
Kaeloo invites Stumpy and his sisters onto a talk show, where they tell the audience about their lives.
237	35	"Let's Play Personality Test!" "(Si on jouait au coach à coacher)"	Rémi Chapotot	Agnès Slimovici	Mélanie Lopez	April 12, 2023
TBA.
238	36	"Let's Play Game Masters - Part 1" "(Si on jouait aux maîtres des jeux, chapitre 1)"	Rémi Chapotot	Peter Berts	Sarah Salard	April 12, 2023
TBA.
239	37	"Let's Play Game Masters - Part 2" "(Si on jouait aux maîtres des jeux, chapitre 2)"	Rémi Chapotot	Peter Berts	Mélanie Lopez	April 12, 2023
TBA.
240	38	"Let's Play Game Masters - Part 3" "(Si on jouait aux maîtres des jeux, chapitre 3)"	Rémi Chapotot	Peter Berts	Valérie Buchholzer	April 12, 2023
TBA. Note: The episode is dedicated to someone named Romain.
241	39	"Let's Play with the Sisters" "(Si on jouait avec les soeurs)"	Rémi Chapotot	Peter Berts	Valérie Buchholzer	April 13, 2023
Stumpy's mother is working late, which means that Stumpy is in charge of taking care of his sisters for the day.
