= Ivana Popović =

Serbian publisher, entrepreneur, and politician

- Ивана Поповић

Member of the National Assembly of the Republic of Serbia
- In office 26 October 2022 – 28 November 2022
- In office 3 August 2020 – 1 August 2022

Personal details
- Born: 20 February 1989 (age 37) Belgrade, SR Serbia, SFR Yugoslavia
- Party: SNS
- Profession: Entrepreneur

Ivana Popović (Serbian Cyrillic: Ивана Поповић; born 20 February 1989) is a Serbian publisher, entrepreneur, and politician. She has served two terms in the Serbian national assembly and is now a state secretary in the ministry of agriculture, forestry, and water management. Popović is a member of the Serbian Progressive Party (SNS).

== Early life and private career ==
Popović was born in Belgrade, in what was then the Socialist Republic of Serbia in the Socialist Federal Republic of Yugoslavia. She holds a bachelor's degree as an economist and has been the marketing manager of the journals Ona and Černogorija. After the start of her professional career, she moved to her family's farm at Kržava in the Krupanj municipality and founded the Džemara company, which specializes in jams and also produces sauces, spices, and other food products. She was awarded the cup for innovation in agribusiness at the 86th Annual Agricultural Fair in Novi Sad in 2019.

== Politician ==
=== Parliamentarian and state secretary ===
Popović was given the fifth position on the Progressive Party's For Our Children electoral list in the 2020 Serbian parliamentary election. This was tantamount to election, and she was indeed elected when the list won a landslide majority victory with 188 out of 250 mandates. During the campaign, she said that her priorities would be small entrepreneurs, youth issues, and ensuring youth have a reason to remain in Serbia.

In her first parliamentary term, Popović was a member of the economy committee (Note: Formally known as the Committee on the Economy, Regional Development, Trade, Tourism and Energy.) and the culture and information committee, a deputy member of the agriculture committee, (Note: Formally known as the Agriculture, Forestry, and Water Management Committee.) a member of Serbia's delegation to the Inter-Parliamentary Union, the leader of Serbia's parliamentary friendship group with South Korea, and a member of the parliamentary friendship groups with Australia, Austria, China, the Czech Republic, Germany, Hungary, Japan, Qatar, Russia, Saudi Arabia, Turkey, the United Arab Emirates, the United Kingdom, and the United States of America.

Popović received the 129th position on the SNS's Together We Can Do Everything list in the 2022 Serbian parliamentary election. The list won a plurality victory with 120 seats, and she was not immediately re-elected. She briefly returned to the assembly in October 2022 as a replacement delegate before standing down the following month.

Popović was appointed as a state secretary in Serbia's ministry of agriculture, forestry, and water management in late 2022. In the term that followed, she represented the ministry at various events throughout Serbia, including the "Taste of the South" event in Vlasotince and the fifteenth agricultural fair in Kruševac. She was appointed to a second term as state secretary after Serbia's new administration was formed in May 2024.

=== Municipal politics ===
Popović received the fifth position the Progressive Party's list for the Krupanj municipal assembly in the 2020 Serbian local elections (held concurrently with that year's parliamentary election) and was elected when the list won a majority victory with twenty-five out of thirty-five seats. Her term ended on 30 October 2023 when the assembly was dissolved for early elections.
