= Pikaboo =

Children's TV channel

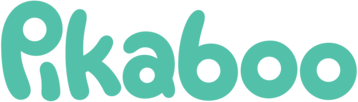
- Type: Television network
- Broadcast area: Bosnia and Herzegovina; Croatia; Kosovo; Montenegro; North Macedonia; Serbia; Slovenia; Europe
- Headquarters: Luxembourg City, Luxembourg

Programming
- Languages: Albanian; Croatian; Macedonian; Serbian; Slovene

Ownership
- Owner: United Group
- Sister channels: Vavoom

History
- Launched: December 4, 2017; 8 years ago

Links
- Website: unitedmedia.net/pikaboo

Pikaboo is a European children's cable channel that started broadcasting on 4 December 2017. The channel is owned by United Media, part of United Group. It is broadcast in Croatia and Bosnia and Herzegovina in Croatian, in Serbia, Montenegro and Republika Srpska in Serbian, in Slovenia in Slovenian, in North Macedonia in Macedonian and Albanian, and in Kosovo in Albanian. It is broadcast 24 hours a day.

== Dubbing ==
Serbian dubbing for this channel was done by the studio Blue House, but the dubbings of the studios Gold Digi Net and Loudworks made earlier for other channels, are also broadcast. The cartoon series Chickens was dubbed by studio IDJ, Lola and Mila by studio Audio Wizard M&D, and Ben 10 by Vamos Production, although these series are broadcast for the first time.
