= Chibiverse =

American animated television series

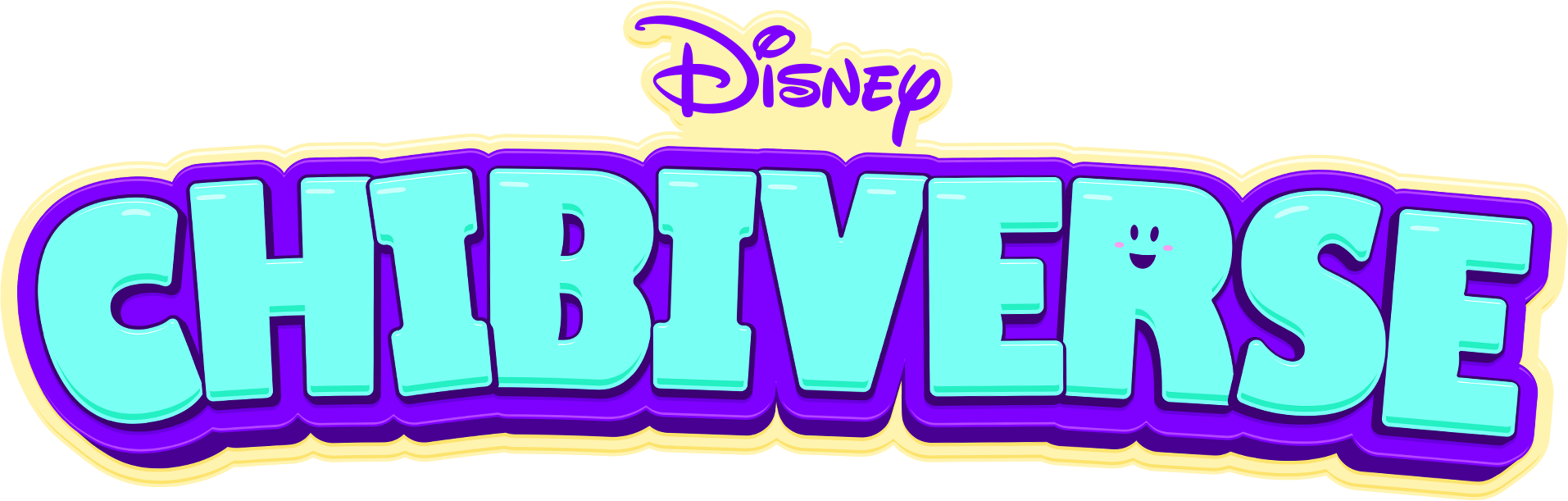
- Genre: Comedy; Variety; Anthology; Crossover
- Based on: Chibi Tiny Tales; Characters by Disney Television Animation
- Developed by: Gino Guzzardo
- Written by: Benjamin Siemon (all of seasons 1–2)
- Directed by: Sabrina Alberghetti (all of seasons 1–2)
- Voices of: Various (see below)
- Opening theme: "Welcome to the Chibiverse"
- Ending theme: "Welcome to the Chibiverse" (instrumental)
- Composer: Keith Horn
- Country of origin: United States
- Original language: English
- No. of seasons: 4
- No. of episodes: 15

Production
- Executive producers: Gino Guzzardo; Dan Siegel
- Producer: Jenna Hicks
- Editor: Matt Brailey
- Running time: 22 minutes
- Production company: Disney Television Animation

Original release
- Network: Disney Channel
- Release: July 30, 2022 – present

Related
- Chibi Tiny Tales

Chibiverse is an American animated television series developed by Gino Guzzardo, produced by Disney Television Animation and premiered on Disney Channel on July 30, 2022. The series is based on the studio's Chibi Tiny Tales short series and features chibi versions of characters from both live-action and animated Disney Channel series.

== Premise ==
In an underground Disney laboratory, a group of Disney scientists took objects from various Disney Channel shows and films and put them in a machine, resulting in the creation of a small glowing bean sized orb that, when viewed underneath a microscope, showed a chibi-fied world inhabited by characters from the various shows. The series follows the quirky and comical adventures of these characters interacting with one another.

== Plot ==
In the first two seasons, the episodes feature several Chibi Tiny Tales shorts, hosted by specific characters who, unlike in the shorts, actually speak. As the hosts introduce themselves and announce the next short, a plot is intertwined throughout these snippets until the episode's conclusion. In the second season, the series transitions to a game show format, although the season finale features a comedy roast. This season introduced characters from Kiff, Hailey's On It!, and Primos.

In the third season, the series again switched format into each episode having 3 different 7-minute original plot story segments lacking any shorts. Since then, the characters have been experiencing small adventures. This season also features more obscure and classic characters from 1990s and 2000s shows and movies, some of which have their former voice actors reprise their roles. In the fourth season, the series added characters from StuGo and The Doomies.

== Voice cast ==
- Pirates of the Caribbean:
  - Grey DeLisle as Redd
- Chip 'n Dale: Rescue Rangers:
  - Jim Cummings as Fat Cat
- Darkwing Duck:
  - Jim Cummings as Darkwing Duck
- Bonkers:
  - Jim Cummings as Bonkers D. Bobcat
- Gargoyles:
  - Keith David as Goliath
- The Proud Family and The Proud Family: Louder and Prouder:
  - Kyla Pratt as Penny Proud
  - Tommy Davidson as Oscar Proud
  - Jo Marie Payton as Suga Mama
  - Karen Malina White as Dijonay Jones
- Kim Possible:
  - Christy Carlson Romano as Kim Possible
  - Will Friedle as Ron Stoppable
  - Nicole Sullivan as Shego
  - Vincent Martella as Rufus's speaking voice
- The Buzz on Maggie:
  - Jessica DiCicco as Maggie Pesky
- Phineas and Ferb:
  - Vincent Martella as Phineas Flynn
  - Ashley Tisdale as Candace Flynn
  - Dan Povenmire as Dr. Heinz Doofenshmirtz
  - Rhys Darby as Perry the Platypus's speaking voice
- Gravity Falls:
  - Kristen Schaal as Mabel Pines
  - Alex Hirsch as Stanley Pines and Soos Ramirez
  - Alfred Molina as Multi-Bear
- Wander Over Yonder:
  - Jack McBrayer as Wander
  - Keith Ferguson as Lord Hater and Killbot 86
- Star vs. the Forces of Evil:
  - Eden Sher as Star Butterfly
  - Adam McArthur as Marco Diaz
  - Fred Tatasciore as Buff Frog
- Descendants:
  - Sarah Jeffery as Princess Audrey
- Billy Dilley's Super-Duper Subterranean Summer:
  - Aaron Springer as Billy Dilley
- DuckTales:
  - David Tennant as Scrooge McDuck
  - Danny Pudi as Huey Duck
  - Ben Schwartz as Dewey Duck
  - Kate Micucci as Webby Vanderquack
  - Beck Bennett as Launchpad McQuack
  - Keith Ferguson as Flintheart Glomgold
  - Jim Rash as Gyro Gearloose
  - Kari Wahlgren as Roxanne Featherly
  - Eric Bauza as the Beagle Boys
- Zombies:
  - Meg Donnelly and Amanda Leighton (Note: Leighton stood in for Donnelly in "Love Boat Liars") as Addison Wells
  - Austin Lee Matthews as Zed Necrodopolis
  - Trevor Tordjman as Bucky Buchanan
  - Matt Cornett as "Zombies 1 + 2 + 3 as Told by Chibi" singer
- Big City Greens:
  - Chris Houghton as Cricket Green
  - Marieve Herington as Tilly Green
  - Bob Joles as Bill Green
  - Artemis Pebdani as Alice Green
  - Zeno Robinson as Remy Remington
  - Anna Akana as Gloria Sato
  - Danny Trejo as Vasquez
  - Nicole Byer as Andromeda
  - Alfred Molina as Snakey's speaking voice
- Amphibia:
  - Brenda Song as Anne Boonchuy
  - Justin Felbinger as Sprig Plantar
  - Bill Farmer as Hop Pop Plantar
  - Amanda Leighton as Polly Plantar
  - Anna Akana as Sasha Waybright
  - Haley Tju as Marcy Wu/"Darcy"
  - Keith David as King Andrias Leviathan
  - Shelby Young as Domino's speaking voice
- The Owl House:
  - Sarah-Nicole Robles as Luz Noceda
  - Wendie Malick as Eda Clawthorne
  - Alex Hirsch as Hooty
  - Mae Whitman as Amity Blight
- The Ghost and Molly McGee:
  - Ashly Burch as Molly McGee
  - Dana Snyder as Scratch
- Hamster & Gretel:
  - Michael Cimino as Kevin Grant-Gomez
  - Beck Bennett as Hamster
  - Dan Povenmire as Alien Pilot
- Kiff:
  - Kimiko Glenn as Kiff Chatterley
  - H. Michael Croner as Barry Buns
  - Lucy Heavens as Helen
- Hailey's On It!:
  - Auliʻi Cravalho as Hailey Banks
  - Manny Jacinto as Scott Denoga
  - Gary Anthony Williams as Beta
  - Amanda Leighton as Kristine Sanchez
- Primos:
  - Myrna Velasco as Tater Ramírez-Humphrey
  - Natasha Kline as Gordita Humphrey and ChaCha Ramírez
  - Cheech Marin as Pop Ramírez
  - Shelby Young as Chuchi's speaking voice
- StuGo:
  - Tania Gunadi as Pliny
  - Zosia Mamet as Merian
- The Doomies:
  - Max Mittelman as Bobby Lafrousse
  - Madison Calderon as Romy Rodriguez
- Original characters from the series:
  - Rob Cantor as Scientist #1 "Gary"
  - Kimiko Glenn as Scientist #2
  - Myrna Velasco as Scientist #4
  - Auliʻi Cravalho as Scientist #5
  - Zeno Robinson as Scientist #6
  - Eden Sher as Scientist #7
  - Shelby Young as Scientist #8 "Kylie"
  - H. Michael Croner (Note: Episode: "Journey to the Center of the Chibiverse") and Zeno Robinson (Note: Episode: "Return of Pebble") as Pebble
  - Jesse McCartney as Dreambot

Other franchises represented, albeit with no voice acting yet, include:

- Adventures of the Gummi Bears
- TaleSpin
- Goof Troop
- The Shnookums & Meat Funny Cartoon Show
- Mighty Ducks: The Animated Series
- Recess
- Pepper Ann
- The Halloweentown franchise
- Johnny Tsunami
- Teacher's Pet
- Lizzie McGuire
- Lloyd in Space
- Fillmore!
- Holes
- The Haunted Mansion
- Dave the Barbarian
- Brandy & Mr. Whiskers
- American Dragon: Jake Long
- The High School Musical franchise
- Hannah Montana
- The Replacements
- Wizards of Waverly Place
- Kick Buttowski: Suburban Daredevil
- Fish Hooks
- Randy Cunningham: 9th Grade Ninja
- Dog with a Blog
- The Teen Beach Movie franchise
- Penn Zero: Part-Time Hero
- Two More Eggs
- Pickle and Peanut
- Bunk'd
- Future-Worm!
- Milo Murphy's Law
- Rapunzel's Tangled Adventure

== Production ==
In July 2022, Disney Television Animation announced that the series, based on the Chibi Tiny Tales shorts, would premiere on July 30. The show consists of shorts centered on "chibi" versions of characters from various Disney Channel programs such as Amphibia and Phineas and Ferb, as well as Disney Channel films such as Zombies and High School Musical, compiled into a half-hour series.

According to series writer Ben Siemon, the series will only consist of Disney Channel-specific characters and that franchise characters that appear in spin-off series of Walt Disney Animation Studios or Pixar movies, such as Rapunzel's Tangled Adventure, Monsters at Work and Big Hero 6: The Series cannot appear on the series due to licensing reasons. Siemon also revealed the characters from Moon Girl and Devil Dinosaur and the Mickey Mouse & Friends franchise cannot appear on the series due to Marvel and Disney being protective over how their characters are represented. However, some characters from DuckTales or Chip 'n Dale: Rescue Rangers have appeared in the series. These characters are treated as part of the Disney Television Animation catalog rather than the core Mickey & Friends franchise, allowing them to be included in crossover segments.

The series has also featured characters from Disney Channel Original Movies (DCOMs) and live-action Disney Channel sitcoms, reflecting their shared production umbrella under Disney Branded Television. In particular, previously live-action characters from franchises such as Lizzie McGuire and Hannah Montana are given new "Chibified" designs and make silent cameos in some episodes, most prominently in the Season 4 episode "Love Boat Liars".

The character Doug Funnie, from the animated series Doug, has not appeared in Chibiverse. Although later seasons of the series were produced by Disney for ABC, resulting in Disney owning the ancillary rights to the characters, the character originally debuted on Nickelodeon. Siemon explained that the character exists in what he described as a “very murky, legal area” due to those origins, stating that the production team is currently unable to use the character in the series but expressed hope that the situation could change in the future.

=== Music ===
Rob Cantor and Dan Siegel wrote the theme song, with Cantor performing alongside Baraka May.

== Episodes ==
All episodes for seasons 1 and 2 were directed by Sabrina Alberghetti and written by Benjamin Siemon, with Dan Siegel co-writing "Pizza vs. Fireworks".

=== Series overview ===
| Season | Episodes | Originally released | |
| Season | Episodes | First released | Last released |
|---|---|---|---|
| 1 | 1 | July 30, 2022 | March 4, 2023 |
| 2 | 3 | September 23, 2023 | August 3, 2024 |
| 3 | 4 | January 18, 2025 | April 26, 2025 |
| 4 | 4 | May 9, 2026 | August 8, 2026 |

=== Season 1 (2022–23) ===
() designates the short was featured more than once.

| No. overall | No. in season | Title | Original release date | Prod. code | U.S. viewers (millions) |
|---|---|---|---|---|---|
| 1 | 1 | "Pizza vs. Fireworks" | July 30, 2022 | 101 | 0.16 |
Molly McGee and Tilly Green start the first "Chibiverse" show, which they plan to end with a big spectacle. However, Cricket Green and Scratch have a heated argument on whether the spectacle should be a fireworks show or a pizza party, respectively. After voting ends in a tie and Scratch and Cricket attempted to sabotage each other, Scratch ends up winning by convincing Tilly to vote for him. Cricket, however, ultimately finds a compromise by using Dr. Doofenshmirtz' fireworks launcher to shoot fireworks made of pizza. First appearance of: Dan Povenmire as Dr. Heinz Doofenshmirtz (Phineas and Ferb); Chris Houghton as Cricket Green (Big City Greens); Marieve Herington as Tilly Green (Big City Greens); Ashly Burch as Molly McGee (The Ghost and Molly McGee); Dana Snyder as Scratch (The Ghost and Molly McGee) Featured shorts: Amphibia: "Frogs in Space" / "Quit Bugging Me"; Big City Greens: "Breakfast Land"; Descendants: "Descendants 3 as Told by Chibi" / "Descendants Date Night"; DuckTales: "Burrito Bash" / "Dime & Dash"; The Ghost and Molly McGee: "Scratch Haunts the Chibiverse" / "The War of Décor"; High School Musical: "High School Musical as Told by Chibi"; The Owl House: "Boiling Isles Bake-Off"; Phineas and Ferb: "Doof Falls for Gramma" / "Run Candace Run" / "Doof's Freezinator"
| 2 | 2 | "Bad Luck Chibis" | September 10, 2022 | 102 | 0.13 |
At the start of the show, Hop Pop breaks theatrical superstitions by wishing Anne and Sprig good luck and saying Macbeth. The Chibi Theater begins to experience bad luck, which only worsens after Hop Pop finds a 13-leaf clover. After asking Molly McGee for advice, Anne, Sprig, Cricket, and Tilly summon the ghost of the Chibi Theater: Scratch. After Scratch denies causing the bad luck, Sprig discovers that Polly was causing the bad luck as she was not asked to host the show. The chibis then end the show with a human pyramid, which topples after Cricket gloats. First appearance of: Brenda Song as Anne Boonchuy (Amphibia); Justin Felbinger as Sprig Plantar (Amphibia); Bill Farmer as Hop Pop Plantar (Amphibia); Amanda Leighton as Polly Plantar (Amphibia) Featured shorts: Amphibia: "Gobble Gobble Goggles" / "Anne in Quicksand" / "Hop Pop Photo Op" / "Bucket Blues" / "Selfie Safari"; Big City Greens: "Turkey Tussle"; Descendants: "Descendants Date Night" (2); DuckTales: "Mayan Mayhem"; The Ghost and Molly McGee: "Springtime for Mama Scratch" / "The War of Décor" (2) / "Mansion Madness"; The Owl House: "Boiling Isles Bake-Off" (2); Phineas and Ferb: "Doof's Hairy Leg-inator" / "Doof Falls for Gramma" (2); Zombies: "Zombies 2 as Told by Chibi"
| 3 | 3 | "The Great Chibi Mix-Up!" | October 8, 2022 | 103 | 0.13 |
Phineas Flynn announces plans for a best friend disco dance off. Dr. Doofenshmirtz brings in his Best Friendinator, which accidentally causes the chibis to forget their best friends. After Phineas is unable to remind the chibis of their best friends, Luz Noceda flies in and attempts to fix the situation with magic; however, Doofenshmirtz interferes with the spell. As a result, the chibis remember their best friends but swap body parts. After watching "Ice Cream Rewind", the chibis build a Rewindinator to rewind time and undo Doofenshmirtz's mistakes. The chibis then celebrate with their dance off. First appearance of: Vincent Martella as Phineas Flynn (Phineas and Ferb); Zeno Robinson as Remy Remington (Big City Greens); Sarah-Nicole Robles as Luz Noceda (The Owl House) Featured shorts: Amphibia: "Quit Bugging Me" (2); Big City Greens: "Christmas Crashers"; Descendants: "Queen of Mean"; The Ghost and Molly McGee: "Scratch Haunts the Chibiverse" (2) / "Scratch's Candy Craze"; Halloweentown: "Halloweentown as Told by Chibi" / "Halloweentown Haircut"; Hamster & Gretel: "Fight at the Museum" / "Ice Cream Rewind"; The Owl House: "Lumity Date Night" / "Hooty the Palisman Sitter"; Phineas and Ferb: "Doof's Freezinator" (2); Zombies: "Zombies 1 + 2 + 3 as Told by Chibi"
| 4 | 4 | "Chibi Villains Unite" | March 4, 2023 | 104 | 0.18 |
Molly McGee and Penny Proud announce plans for a chibi pet parade when the chibi villains arrive to take over the Chibiverse. Unimpressed by the depiction of villains in the chibi shorts, King Andrias orders Princess Audrey to imprison the chibis, though she accidentally imprisons a cardboard cutout of Molly and Penny. After Molly distracts the villains, Puff uses a new trick that he learned to turn his tail into a key and pick open the lock on the pets' cage. The pets then capture the villains and take part in their pet parade. First appearance of: Kyla Pratt as Penny Proud (The Proud Family); Sarah Jeffery as Princess Audrey (Descendants); Keith Ferguson as Flintheart Glomgold (DuckTales); Keith David as King Andrias Leviathan (Amphibia); Beck Bennett as Hamster (Hamster & Gretel) Featured shorts: Amphibia: "Mantis Bowling" / "The Amphibia House" / "Pirates of the Caribbean x Amphibia"; Big City Greens: "Prune Wars" / "Tower of Terror" / "Say It Ain't Snow" / "Big City Greens Christmas Marathon"; DuckTales: "Jungle Cruise x DuckTales"; The Ghost and Molly McGee: "Mansion Madness" (2); Halloweentown: "First Date Fright"; Hamster & Gretel: "Rollercoaster Romance"; High School Musical: "High School Musical as Told by Chibi" (2); The Owl House: "The Amphibia House"; The Proud Family / The Proud Family: Louder and Prouder: "Prune Wars" / "Twin Troubles" / "Game of Phones"

=== Season 2 (2023–24) ===
| No. overall | No. in season | Title | Original release date | Prod. code | U.S. viewers (millions) |
|---|---|---|---|---|---|
| 5 | 1 | "The Chibi Quiz Challenge" | September 23, 2023 | 201 | 0.10 |
Kiff Chatterley hosts the first ever Chibiverse game show "The Chibi Quiz Challenge!", where three contestants (Flintheart Glomgold, later replaced by Launchpad McQuack, Marcy Wu, and Suga Mama) answer questions based on the chibi shorts that are seen throughout the show. Launchpad has difficulty answering questions, Marcy has several unlucky mishaps, and Suga Mama wins a recliner. By accident, Launchpad wins the grand prize, which was stolen by Flintheart Glomgold and then recovered by Vasquez. First appearance of: Kimiko Glenn as Kiff Chatterley (Kiff); Beck Bennett as Launchpad McQuack (DuckTales); Jo Marie Payton as Suga Mama (The Proud Family); Haley Tju as Marcy Wu (Amphibia); Keith Ferguson as Lord Hater (Wander Over Yonder); Michael Cimino as Kevin Grant-Gomez (Hamster & Gretel) Featured shorts: Amphibia: "Frogs in Space" (2) / "Selfie Safari" (2); Big City Greens: "Turkey Tussle" (2) / "Grandma vs Grandson"; Disney Channel: "Chibis Out to the Ballgame" / "Happy Birthday, Disney Channel!"; DuckTales: "Dime & Dash" (2) / "Burrito Bash" (2); The Ghost and Molly McGee: "Scratch, the 300th Wheel" / "Scratch's Sugar Rush" (2); Hamster & Gretel: "Binocular Blues" / "Museum Mayhem" (2) / Laundry Day; Kiff: "Shock and Claw"; Milo Murphy's Law: "Binocular Blues"; Phineas and Ferb "Candace Against the Universe as Told by Chibi" / "Binocular Blues"
| 6 | 2 | "The Chibi Couple Game" | February 14, 2024 | 202 | N/A |
Tilly Green hosts a chibi couple game with Star and Marco, Luz and Amity, and Hailey and Scott, the later of whom entered due to a mistake by Scott and to Hailey's surprise as they are not dating. Despite that, Hailey and Scott pull ahead as Beta was rigging the game in an attempt to get them to kiss. After Scott purposely gets the final question wrong, Star and Marco and Luz and Amity win. First appearance of: Eden Sher as Star Butterfly (Star vs. the Forces of Evil); Adam McArthur as Marco Diaz (Star vs. the Forces of Evil); Mae Whitman as Amity Blight (The Owl House); Auliʻi Cravalho as Hailey Banks (Hailey's On It!); Manny Jacinto as Scott Denoga (Hailey's On It!) Featured shorts: Amphibia: "The Amphibia House" (2); Big City Greens: "Doof Falls for Gramma" (3) / "Get Saxon Back Son"; Camp Rock: "Camp Rock as Told by Chibi"; Descendants: "Descendants 3 as Told by Chibi" (2) / "Descendants Date Night at the Museum" (3); Hailey's On It!: Science Unfair / "Beta's in Love"; Halloweentown: "First Date Fright" (2); Hamster & Gretel: "Rollercoaster Romance" (2); Kiff: "Toilet Flood Pool Party"; The Owl House: "Lumity Date Night" (2) / "The Amphibia House" (2); Phineas and Ferb: "Doof Falls for Gramma" (3); The Proud Family / The Proud Family: Louder and Prouder: "Game of Phones" (2); Zombies: "Zombies 1 + 2 + 3 as Told by Chibi" (2)
| 7 | 3 | "The Roast of Dr. Doofenshmirtz" | August 3, 2024 | 203 | N/A |
Tater Ramírez-Humphrey and Kiff Chatterley host a roast of Dr. Doofenshmirtz. Scratch and Marcy Wu take part in the roast with the latter struggling until she is briefly possessed by Darcy. Perry the Platypus takes part after consuming a Gyro Gearloose Barksian Modulator allowing him to talk for the first time. At the end of the roast, Dr. Doofenshmirtz reveals that it was a scheme to take over the Chibiverse by covering it with glue using his "I'm Rubber And You're Glue Whatever You Say Bounces Off Of Me And Sticks To You-Inator". The Inator then self destructs after the chibis compliment Dr. Doofenshmirtz. First appearance of: Myrna Velasco as Tater Ramírez-Humphrey (Primos); Rhys Darby as Perry the Platypus's speaking voice (Phineas and Ferb) Featured shorts: Amphibia: "The Amphibia House 2"; Hailey's On It!: "Fortune Teller" / "Hailey's On the Matterhorn" / "Chaos Bot Picnic"; Hamster & Gretel: "Super Pet Pals" / "Life with Linda"; Kiff: "Super Slide" / "Bounce House"; Milo Murphy's Law: "Life with Linda"; The Owl House: "The Amphibia House 2"; Phineas and Ferb: "Super Pet Pals" / "Life with Linda" / "Phineas & Ferb Go to Space Mountain" / "The Balloon-inator"; Primos: "Get Baby Bud's Binky Back" / "Odd Primo Out" / "Summer of Silencio"; The Proud Family / The Proud Family: Louder and Prouder: "The Proud Family on Big Thunder Mountain"; Zombies: "Unlucky Bucky" / "The Problem With Pompoms"

=== Season 3 (2025) ===
From this season forward, each listed episode consists of three 7-minute segments that were produced separately.

| No. overall | No. in season | Title | Directed by | Written by | Storyboarded by | Original release date | Prod. code |
|---|---|---|---|---|---|---|---|
| 8 | 1 | "Grown Ups Island" | Christine Liu | Benjamin Siemon | Ryan Agustin | January 18, 2025 | 301 |
| 8 | 1 | "Opposites Attack" | Sabrina Alberghetti | Gloria Shen | Cat Harman-Mitchell | January 18, 2025 | 302 |
| 8 | 1 | "Stan's 11" | Sabrina Alberghetti | Madison Bateman | Cat Harman-Mitchell | January 18, 2025 | 303 |
All the grown-ups are fed up with their children's loud and annoying antics, but when one of the scientists (Note: As depicted from the Chibiverse theme song.) accidentally drops a crumb from his pumpernickel sandwich onto the Chibiverse, all the chibis mistake it for an island. Cricket Green, Tater Ramírez-Humphrey and Kiff Chatterley want the island to be for children only but the grown-ups take the island for themselves, due to all the commotion in their current state. Cricket, Tater and Kiff decide to crash Grown-Ups Island as they think the adults are doing fun stuff, but must get past Vasquez. When they succeed, the three are later not interested in Grown-Ups Island anymore when they learn that the adults are doing grown-up stuff like washing dishes or doing taxes, whilst learning that they don't need an island to have fun. However, when the kids leave, the adults reveal that they were doing fun stuff the whole time, just like the kids thought. First appearance of: Bob Joles as Bill Green (Big City Greens) Featured song: "Grown Ups Island" On a hot day, the chibis cool off at the Chibiverse pool. Anne Boonchuy is excited for her Calamity Trio synchronized swim routine with Sasha Waybright and Marcy Wu. However, Marcy isn't really good at synchronizing so Helen gives her a potion to make her the opposite of who she is. When Marcy accidentally drops the potion into the pool, it affects the other chibis instead. Fortunately, Helen has an antidote potion but Molly McGee steals it. Molly recruits Mabel Pines and Tilly Green on her evil plot to "en-saddify" the Chibiverse. Marcy and Helen come to Launchpad McQuack, Scott Denoga and Barry Buns (who are now smart) for help. The three come up with a plan to retrieve the antidote potion and it succeeds perfectly, turning the Chibiverse back to normal. Anne and Sasha accept Marcy's differences and still allow her to be part of the swim routine. First appearance of: Lucy Heavens as Helen (Kiff) Featured song: "Joy No More" Scrooge McDuck upgrades his security and defense measures in the Money Bin and vows to give 1 million Chibi coins to anyone who attempts and succeeds in breaking into his vault. However, Stanley Pines recruits the T-Sisters (Tere, Tabi and Toñita Ramirez), Helen, Scratch, Perry the Platypus, Soos Ramirez, Cricket and Tilly Green, Sprig Plantar and Eliza Zambi in his new team "Stan's 11," to break into and rob the Money Bin. Soos was hired as a janitor for the Money Bin and opens the door for the rest of the group. The vault takes four keys to open, which each is separated in its own location. Stan's 11 successfully retrieves all four keys needed to open the vault, only to discover that Soos was actually Scrooge McDuck in disguise. However, Stan was actually the disguise of Ford, his twin brother, with the real Stan already inside the vault. It is revealed that the promised 1 million Chibi coins were actually chocolate covered in gold wrappers, much to Stan's dismay. First appearance of: Alex Hirsch as Stan Pines and Soos Ramirez (Gravity Falls) and Hooty (The Owl House); David Tennant as Scrooge McDuck (DuckTales)
| 9 | 2 | "Dr. Doof's Lab" | Christine Liu | Madison Bateman | Ryan Jouas | February 22, 2025 | 304 |
| 9 | 2 | "Journey to the Center of the Chibiverse" | Sabrina Alberghetti | Benjamin Siemon | Mike Austin | February 22, 2025 | 306 |
| 9 | 2 | "The Perfect Gift" | Sabrina Alberghetti | Gloria Shen & Benjamin Siemon | Mike Austin | February 22, 2025 | 305 |
Kim Possible, Marco Diaz, Kiff Chatterley and Cricket Green are invited by Dr. Doofenshmirtz for a tour of his lab with a special prize at the end of the tour. After Kim destroys Dr. Doof's inventions, Kiff plays with Doof's city model, and Marco leads Doof's "Doofaloofas" in a strike, they are escorted out of the lab. When Cricket remains the final person left, he wins the prize: being Doof's assistant. Cricket decides to make tiny clones of himself, similar to Doof's Doofaloofas, to help out but they end up destroying the entire lab. First appearance of: Christy Carlson Romano as Kim Possible (Kim Possible) Featured song: "Lab of Evil Science" It's Pogo Stick Day in the Chibiverse where chibis jump on pogo sticks together. However, when they all jump at the same time, this causes a "Chibiquake" and Remy Remington falls down a crevasse. Phineas Flynn and Ferb Fletcher build a drill machine to dive down the Chibiverse and rescue Remy. Meanwhile, Remy discovers that multiple other chibis, who are known as the "Underchibis", have also fallen down the crevasse. Phineas and Ferb along with Star Butterfly and Vasquez arrive and return Remy and the Underchibis back to the mainland. First appearance of: Danny Trejo as Vasquez (Big City Greens); Jessica DiCicco as Maggie Pesky (The Buzz on Maggie); Aaron Springer as Billy Dilley (Billy Dilley's Super-Duper Subterranean Summer); Jim Cummings as Darkwing Duck (Darkwing Duck), Fat Cat (Chip 'n Dale: Rescue Rangers) and Bonkers D. Bobcat (Bonkers) Original character: H. Michael Croner as Pebble Featured song: "Welcome to the Underverse" At the Chibiverse Magic Mansion, Luz Noceda and Amity Blight celebrate their one-year "Chibiversary," but Luz hasn't gotten Amity anything yet. Helen tells her about the legendary "Perfect Gift" which is guarded by traps on Chibi Rock. She is later forced to have Dewey Duck accompany her, as he knows the way. The two land on Chibi Rock and pass through many challenges. When they make it, Luz discovers that Amity was also trying to get the Perfect Gift. They open the Perfect Gift together to find a mirror that shows them their past memories. First appearance of: Danny Pudi as Huey Duck (DuckTales); Ben Schwartz as Dewey Duck (DuckTales); Alfred Molina as Multi-Bear (Gravity Falls) Note: This episode features an animated version of the live-action character Alex Russo (Wizards of Waverly Place). She does not speak.
| 10 | 3 | "Penny and the Chibi Scouts" | Christine Liu | Madison Bateman | Ashley Simpson | March 22, 2025 | 307 |
| 10 | 3 | "Quackstreet Boys" | Sabrina Alberghetti | Sabrina Brennan | Thomas Collins | March 22, 2025 | 308 |
| 10 | 3 | "Cheer Up Chibis" | Sabrina Alberghetti | Sabrina Brennan | Raj Brueggmann | March 22, 2025 | 309 |
Oscar Proud spies on his daughter Penny Proud while she's hanging out with the "Villain Kids" and decides to sign her up to Camp Chibiwaka (a spoof of Camp Kikiwaka) to become a Chibi scout. Her scoutmates Molly McGee, Huey Duck, Candace Flynn, Libby Stein-Torres, Violet Sabrewing and Isabella Garcia-Shapiro fool Oscar into believing Chibiwaka is a safe and educational camp, until he leaves and they reveal to Penny that it's actually a death-defying stunt camp. Oscar later finds out and tries to save Penny but ends up getting brutally injured himself. In the end, he begs Penny not to return to Camp Chibiwaka and allows her to continue hanging out with the Villain Kids. First appearance of: Tommy Davidson as Oscar Proud (The Proud Family) Featured songs: "Camp Chibiwaka", "Ready for Anything" In an episode of the reality series "On the Other Side of the Tunes", the rise and fall of the music boy band group, The Quackstreet Boys (Barry Buns, Dewey Duck, Scott Denoga and Cricket Green) is explained by Star Butterfly. The Quackstreet Boys began after the four entered a haunted mansion and their scream, after encountering ghosts, were on-rhythm. Then, the four were inspired to start a band, with Dewey naming it "The Quackstreet Boys". They were discovered by the most toughest music producer Polly Plantar, and they created their first song, "Fame and Fortune", which became a hit in the Chibiverse. The Quackstreet Boys went on a planet-wide tour to perform their song. The band was popular until one night at the Chibi Music Awards when Dewey decided to go solo after an argument with the other group members. This only lasted a week before the group reunited with each other. Though, they were too late as they were now overtaken by the Spice Squirrels (Tater Ramírez-Humphrey, Kristine Sanchez, Kiff Chatterley and Penny Proud). First appearance of: H. Michael Croner as Barry Buns (Kiff) Featured songs: "Fame and Fortune", "If You Wanna Be My Friend" When a scientist plays some classical Beethoven music, the theme of it makes the chibis of Chibiverse feel sad and depressed. Bucky Buchanan and his cheer team consisting of Kim Possible, Dijonay Jones, the T-Sisters, Sasha Waybright and Kristine Sanchez plan to cheer up the chibis with a pep rally. However, Addison Wells also recruits Kiff Chatterley, Tater Ramírez-Humphrey, Scratch, Hop Pop Plantar, Hooty and Pickle but aren't as good as the other team. Addison decides to train her group but learns it's impossible. Due to this, Addison allows the team to be themselves and end up putting the chibis in a frenzy of a good time. First appearance of: Meg Donnelly as Addison Wells (Zombies); Trevor Tordjman as Bucky Buchanan (Zombies); Karen Malina White as Dijonay Jones (The Proud Family) Featured song: "We Can Only Get Better"
| 11 | 4 | "Mabel's Dream Date" | Christine Liu | Madison Bateman | Monty Ray | April 26, 2025 | 310 |
| 11 | 4 | "Grandparent Napped" | Christine Liu | Madison Bateman | Ashley Simpson | April 26, 2025 | 312 |
| 11 | 4 | "Space Race" | Christine Liu | Gloria Shen | Ryan Agustin | April 26, 2025 | 311 |
During dance season in the Chibiverse, Mabel Pines searches for a date to dance with for the Chibi Hawkings dance. She tries setting up with many boy chibis but isn't interested in any of them. Because of this, she resorts to Gyro Gearloose to create the ideal date. Once finished, Gyro warns Mabel that her "Dreambot" will turn evil if it's not deactivated after 9pm. At the dance, Mabel and her Dreambot are about to kiss until 9pm hits and the evil Dreambot destroys the entire dance. When Mabel remembers that Gyro previously warned her to keep the Dreambot away from liquid, she calls Waddles and dumps fruit punch on the Dreambot, destroying it. In the end, Mabel learns that there's no such thing as a dream date and accepts everyone for who they are. First appearance of: Kristen Schaal as Mabel Pines (Gravity Falls); Jim Rash as Gyro Gearloose (DuckTales) Original characters: Jesse McCartney as Dreambot Featured song: "My Perfect Dream Date" Amidst grandparents getting kidnapped across the Chibiverse, Tater Ramírez-Humphrey discovers her grandparents Pop and Buela Ramírez getting kidnapped right in the act and enlists the help of the Chibi Hall of Heroes to find them. Over there, Tater is assigned with Perry the Platypus and gets the idea to disguise Tater as a grandma to find out who's the mystery kidnapper. After getting kidnapped, Tater is reunited with Pop and Buela, only to discover that "Darcy" (Marcy being controlled by the Core) is kidnapping grandparents to steal their wisdom in an attempt to conquer the Chibiverse. Darcy is about to attack Tater until Perry arrives and fights her. However, he is unable to defeat her as she's too wise with the wisdom, until she starts receiving negative wisdom from the elders. Perry and Tater manages to remove the Core, turning Darcy back to Marcy. Pop thanks Tater for rescuing him and the others, before falling back to sleep. First appearance of: Cheech Marin as Pop Ramirez (Primos); Artemis Pebdani as Alice Green (Big City Greens); Jack McBrayer as Wander (Wander Over Yonder) Featured song: "The Chibi Hall of Heroes" When a kid named Braden drops pepperoni on the Chibiverse, the chibis mistake it for a new moon, which Hailey Banks wants to explore. In the Starship Chibiprise, Hailey the captain, Launchpad McQuack the pilot, Phineas Flynn and Ferb Fletcher on navigation, Beta on communication, Gordita Humphrey the scientist, Bill Green the engineer, ChaCha Ramírez the weaponist and Addison Wells the resident alien set off for the moon. However, Lord Hater and his team of space villains plan to reach the moon first and claim it. Hailey tries to distract Lord Hater while the Chibiprise charges to light speed, but when Lord Hater finds out, the villains attack the ship. However, the Chibiprise is able to evade and defeat the villains. When the Chibiprise finally lands on the moon, the chibis discover that it was pepperoni the whole time. The Chibiprise returns to the Chibiverse with the pepperoni, which will sustain the chibis for centuries to come. First appearance of: Gary Anthony Williams as Beta (Hailey's On It!); Natasha Kline as Gordita Humphrey and ChaCha Ramírez (Primos)

=== Season 4 (2026) ===
Each listed episode consists of three 7-minute segments that were produced separately.

| No. overall | No. in season | Title | Directed by | Written by | Storyboarded by | Original release date | Prod. code |
|---|---|---|---|---|---|---|---|
| 12 | 1 | "Chibivengers" | Matt Whitlock | Benjamin Siemon | Dave Thomas | May 9, 2026 | 401 |
| 12 | 1 | "Star Butterfly Effect" | Sabrina Alberghetti | Benjamin Siemon | Mike Austin | May 9, 2026 | 402 |
| 12 | 1 | "Kiff Possible" | Matt Whitlock | Madison Bateman | Dave Thomas | May 9, 2026 | 403 |
When Dr. Doofenshmirtz invents the Snapinator, a metal glove that grants his every wish anytime he snaps, he wishes to take over the Chibiverse, which actually works and turns every monument in the town into a replica of him. When multiple superheroes try to stop him however, Doof uses the glove to trap them. Back at the town, a group of chibis protest to become superheroes and stop Doof once and for all. Soon enough, an alien spaceship hovers above them and grants them superpowers to become the Chibivengers. They later raid Doof's headquarters and battle his army of Doof robots. Kiff Chatterley gets Perry the Platypus to blindfold Doof so she can replace his Snapinator with a baseball glove. Once he realizes he's outnumbered, Kiff destroys the Snapinator, returning the Chibiverse to its former glory. First appearance of: Dan Povenmire as Alien Pilot (Hamster & Gretel); Amanda Leighton as Kristine Sanchez (Hailey's On It!) Featured song: "One Hour Power" The Chibiverse is hosting a Chibi Potluck, and Merian is in charge of planning out the party, in the hopes she'll be accepted into the Chibi Party Planning Committee. She also plans for Star Butterfly to surprise the chibis and burst out of the potluck's cake to cast a spell to rain candies from the sky. However, when the surprise is revealed, it sets off a chain of reactions that destroy the entire potluck, much to the committee's disapproval. Merian then asks Phineas Flynn if she can use his time machine to travel back before the disaster and prevent it. She travels back numerous times trying to convince Star not to surprise the chibis, but every attempt ends up in a disaster. Merian soon realizes that she was so focused on impressing the Party Planning Committee, that she forgot to have fun at the party in the process. She then decides to go back in time one last time and turns the destroyed potluck into a food fight, which ends up getting her accepted to the committee. First appearance of: Anna Akana as Gloria Sato (Big City Greens) and Sasha Waybright (Amphibia); Zosia Mamet as Merian (StuGo) Featured song: "This Time" During Meet Your Heroes Day, Kiff Chatterley meets up with Kim Possible and appears to be a big fan of her work. Kiff's best friend Barry Buns also meets up with Kim's sidekick Ron Stoppable. The duo give the animals a tour of the Chibi Hero Lab, where they offer to let the animals star in their own rendition of the Kim Possible theme song. When they finish, the gang decide to treat themselves to lunch. However, out of nowhere, a beam controlled by Lord Hater abducts Kim Possible. This leads Kiff, Barry, and Ron to go rescue her. They first suit up, and then hitch a ride to Lord Hater's lair. They then fight his army of Watchdogs, and manage to rescue Kim. This is until they realize that Kim was only pretending to be captured to test the duo to become real superheroes. First appearance of: Will Friedle as Ron Stoppable (Kim Possible) Featured song: "Call Me, Beep Me!" (with modified lyrics)
| 13 | 2 | "Candace's Old Year Resolutions" | Sabrina Alberghetti & Matt Whitlock | Madison Bateman | Ryan Jouas | June 6, 2026 | 404 |
| 13 | 2 | "Snowball Battle Royale" | Sabrina Alberghetti | Sabrina Brennan | Mike Austin | June 6, 2026 | 405 |
| 13 | 2 | "Love Boat Liars" | Sabrina Alberghetti | Madison Bateman | Monica Davila | June 6, 2026 | 406 |
The Chibiverse is celebrating New Year's Eve, but Candace Flynn is disappointed that she still hasn't completed any of her New Year's resolutions yet, from a few years ago. Tilly Green notes that everytime she tries to complete a resolution, she always gets distracted by trying to bust her brothers and their inventions. Beta then appears and offers to help Candace finally complete her resolutions. At first, it's going great and Candace is quickly finishing her resolutions, but as soon as she spots her brothers throwing a New Year's party, she attempts to send her parents a message, until Beta reminds her of her first resolution, which was to stop busting her brothers. Candace then decides to delete the message, but her hand slips and presses "send" by accident, releasing the message from her phone as it locates her parents. She and a bunch of other chibis team up to stop the message from reaching Candace's parents. They secretly infiltrate Grown Ups Island to retrieve the message before getting to her mom's phone. She then returns to the house, and ends up enjoying the boys' party, until she gets stuck on top of the fan, and her parents return and think she's responsible for the mess. First appearance of: Ashley Tisdale as Candace Flynn (Phineas and Ferb) Featured song: "Check It Off" Scientist Gary discovers that a scientist has accidentally left the Chibiverse in the freezer. Because of the temperature, the chibis enjoy a perfect snow day. Meanwhile, Kiff Chatterley and Barry Buns visit a convenience store to get some hot cocoa. However, as Kiff puts her hand on it first, so does multiple other chibis. Kiff and Tilly Green soon declare a snowball battle royale, and the last chibi standing wins the hot cocoa. However, almost immediately, Tilly gets hit with a snowball by Alice Green, who also wants the hot cocoa. The battle then begins, and multiple chibis already get hit with snowballs. After a song montage, Kiff and Barry realize that the only person left other than them is the Gargoyle. However, he is quickly defeated by Big Time Beagle, who wishes to grant the hot cocoa to his mother. Kiff and Barry refuse to surrender as there is only one of him, until it's revealed all the Beagle Boys are in the competition as well. Kiff then uses Gizmo Duck's suit to defeat the Beagle Boys and win the cocoa. However, it is revealed that Kiff was already hit with snowballs during the fight, leaving Barry to win the cocoa. First appearance of: Eric Bauza as the Beagle Boys (DuckTales) Featured songs: "Hot Cocoa", "Barry's Lament" The SS Relationship cruise has arrived and only boards chibi couples. However, Scratch is more excited about the all-you-can-eat buffet. He then sees Helen who is mad that Zed Necrodopolis and Addison Wells won't let her board the ship without a couple. She wishes to impress the crew directors to make her the headliner. Scratch and Helen soon get the idea to pretend to be a couple in order to be allowed on the cruise. Once they get onboard, they go their separate ways, before being immediately brought back together for a painting event. Later on, the two fight during a "romantic" lunch, which lead Zed and Addison to believe they're fighting and encourages them to sing a song to work out their feelings. When they finish, Addison welcomes the new headliner, Hannah Montana, which enrages Helen, who believe she rightfully deserves the position. She then reveals she and Scratch are not a couple, which gets them kicked out of the cruise. They then decide to be friends instead, which gets them invited to the SS Friendship cruise which has both of the things they love most. First appearance of: Austin Lee Matthews as Zed Necrodopolis; Amanda Leighton as Addison Wells (Zombies) Featured song: "This Thing Could Be Love" Note: This episode features animated versions of the live-action characters Hannah Montana (Hannah Montana), Lizzie McGuire and Gordo (Lizzie McGuire). They do not speak.
| 14 | 3 | "Return of Pebble" | Sabrina Alberghetti | Story by : Mike Austin & Patricia T. Deogracias; Written by : Benjamin Siemon | Mike Austin & Patricia T. Deogracias | July 5, 2026 | 409 |
| 14 | 3 | "Lost Pets" | Sabrina Alberghetti | Rachel McNevin | Katherine Crossan | July 5, 2026 | 407 |
| 14 | 3 | "Mystery Busters" | Matt Whitlock | Madison Bateman | Ryan Jouas | July 5, 2026 | 408 |
Star Butterfly, Remy Remington and Cricket Green dig underground to find Pebble, a large rock that had seemingly sacrificed itself during the prior rescue of Remy and the "Underchibis". (Note: As depicted in the episode "Journey to the Center of the Chibiverse".) They arrive to find that Pebble has crystalised into a giant diamond under pressure. The trio invite Pebble to live with them on the surface, but Flintheart Glomgold spots the diamond and plots to steal it for himself so as to beat Scrooge McDuck as the richest duck in the Chibiverse. He enlists the help of other villains, including Shego, who successfully captures Pebble by setting a trap as the group frolic in leaf clumps, prompting Star, Remy and Cricket to infiltrate Villain Villa to mount a rescue. The trio then finds sanctuary for Pebble in Scrooge's Money Bin, away from the prying eyes of the villains. First appearance of: Nicole Sullivan as Shego (Kim Possible) Original characters: Zeno Robinson as Pebble Featured song: "That's How You Be a Chibi" Gyro Gearloose invites Ron Stoppable, Phineas and Ferb, Remy Remington, Anne Boonchuy and Tater Ramírez-Humphrey to an unveiling of a new batch of Barksian Modulators, which can grant non-verbal animals the ability to speak. Their pets - Rufus, Perry the Platypus, Snakey, Domino and Chuchi respectively - will serve as test subjects. When a scientist switches on her new desk fan next to the Chibiverse, the resulting wind is strong enough to blow away Gyro's entire setup, along with the pets strapped to it. They land in a junkyard, where Perry the Platypus quickly takes charge of leading the pets home. Perry struggles to shoulder the mission on his own, leading Rufus and the remaining pets to offer their help as they work together to fend off a hostile Multi-Bear. In the end, the pets reunite with their owners, though Gyro is devastated by the loss of his Barksian Modulators. First appearance of: Vincent Martella as Rufus's speaking voice (Kim Possible); Alfred Molina as Snakey's speaking voice (Big City Greens); Shelby Young as Domino's speaking voice (Amphibia) and Chuchi's speaking voice (Primos) Featured song: "Platy-Push!" The "Mystery Busters" - Webby Vanderquack, Mabel Pines, Andromeda and Pliny - investigate a string of weird mashup events across the Chibiverse. Recalling past peculiarities, from freak weather events (Note: As depicted in "Opposites Attack" and "Snowball Battle Royale".) to the sudden appearances of Grown-Ups Island (Note: As depicted in "Grown Ups Island".) and the pepperoni moon, (Note: As depicted in "Space Race".) they hypothesise that their world exists within an even bigger world. Their theory is seemingly proven correct when they find the employee ID of Scientist Gary, who had brought his cat Helix to work that day. Unbeknownst to Gary, the random Chibi mashups were caused by Helix, which had been allowed to roam all over the mashup control board. In the Chibiverse, various solutions are discussed to establish contact with the lab, including a giant voice amplifier built by Phineas and Ferb. Suddenly, gale-force winds throw the Chibis off their feet - a result of Helix playing with the Chibiverse like a ball. Webby, Andromeda, Pliny and a mashed-up King Andrias struggle to the voice amplifier and shout for help. Only then does Gary, who had taken cover under the desk after being spotted by the Chibis, realise the extent of the chaos. Thankfully, the Chibiverse has a reset button, which the scientists use to rewind to the previous day and undo the damage. With memories of the chaos erased, life returns to normal in the Chibiverse, until Webby again discovers Gary's eye observing them from the sky. First appearance of: Kate Micucci as Webby Vanderquack (DuckTales); Nicole Byer as Andromeda (Big City Greens); Tania Gunadi as Pliny (StuGo) Featured song: "Figure It Out"
| 15 | 4 | "Underground Monster Wrestling Club" | Matt Whitlock | Rachel McNevin | Amy Mai | August 8, 2026 | 412 |
| 15 | 4 | "Pirates of the Chibibbean" | Matt Whitlock | Madison Bateman | Dylan Holden | August 8, 2026 | 411 |
| 15 | 4 | "Gone Barry Gone" | Sabrina Alberghetti | Rachel McNevin | Monica Davila | August 8, 2026 | 410 |
Cricket Green shows off his fast digging skills, but is annoyed when a news crew ignores him in favour of Hop Pop Plantar and his large avocado. After accidentally falling down one of his holes due to a mishap, Cricket finds a top secret underground monster wrestling club, where the victors win glory and praise. Craving attention, he attempts to participate, but since he is not a monster, he is barred from entry by Buff Frog, who informs that any non-monsters who trespass would be fed to the "Green Worm". Terrified, Cricket hides in a locker room, where he meets Bobby Lafrousse and Romy Rodriguez, who are attempting to record the action for their web series, The Doomies. Cricket helps the duo sneak in by disguising themselves as monsters. As the tournament commences, Bobby and Romy's follower count gets a boost from footage of the action, while Cricket volunteers for the final cage battle against Goliath. Cricket is no match for Goliath, which prompts Bobby and Romy to suggest forfeiting his participation, much to his dismay. Their cover is blown in the ensuing tussle, leading Cricket to tunnel the group out of the club with the monsters in pursuit. The group successfully escape the club, and Bobby and Romy compliment Cricket's digging, though their followers dry up when their livestream fails to buffer underground. First appearance of: Kari Wahlgren as Roxanne Featherly (DuckTales); Wendie Malick as Eda Clawthorne (The Owl House); Fred Tatasciore as Buff Frog (Star vs. the Forces of Evil); Max Mittelman as Bobby Lafrousse (The Doomies); Madison Calderon as Romy Rodriguez (The Doomies); Keith David as Goliath (Gargoyles) Captain Redd assembles a crew of pirates and villains for a treasure hunting mission. Molly McGee attempts to join, but is rejected for being too nice. Determined, Molly assembles her own crew of "nice pirates" - Barry Buns, Webby Vanderquack, Ferb Fletcher and Shrimpy - and challenges Redd to a race for the treasure. At first, both ships are neck and neck, but Redd takes the lead by firing a canon at Molly's noticeably under-defended ship, damaging its sail. Dejected, the nice crew tuck in for a snack, but Barry notices a hungry dolphin and shares his sandwich with it. In return, the dolphin pushes their ship along, and the nice crew claim the treasure first, only to have it stolen by Redd at the last moment. First appearance of: Grey DeLisle as Redd (Pirates of the Caribbean) Featured song: "Nice Pirates" Note: Redd (Pirates of the Caribbean) is a character who has not been featured in any Disney Branded Television programme. Her spoken appearance in this episode marks the first of its kind for this series. Barry Buns feels hurt when he sees his best friend Kiff Chatterley spend more time with Perry the Platypus than with him, so he goes on a solo bike ride through the forest to calm himself. A shadowy figure seemingly kidnaps him after he falls off his bike in a denser part of the forest, prompting Kiff and Perry to launch a search. It is later revealed that the shadowy figure is that of Tilly Green, who had brought Barry back to the Green family home to nurse his injury. Kiff and Perry locate Barry and sneak into the Greens' residence - Kiff stubs her toe and is found and "warded" by Tilly, while Perry is discovered by Alice Green and deemed an intruder. Tilly finds Alice holding Perry by the kitchen stove as Alice declares her intention to cook the platypus for lunch, prompting the three animals to run from the Green household in fright. Featured song: "Search Party"

=== Holiday Special (2026) ===
Produced as part of Season 4, but airing as a standalone special.

| No. | Title | Directed by | Written by | Storyboarded by | Original release date | Prod. code |
|---|---|---|---|---|---|---|
| 16 | "The Doof That Ruined Christmas" | TBA | TBA | TBA | December 19, 2026 | 405 |

== Release ==
Chibiverse premiered on Disney Channel on July 30, 2022. Episodes from the first season were uploaded to Disney Channel's YouTube channel prior to their television debuts on the same days. The first season was added to Disney+ on March 8, 2023. Seasons 2 and 3 were released on Disney+ on August 13, 2025.
