= Fictional resistance movements and groups =

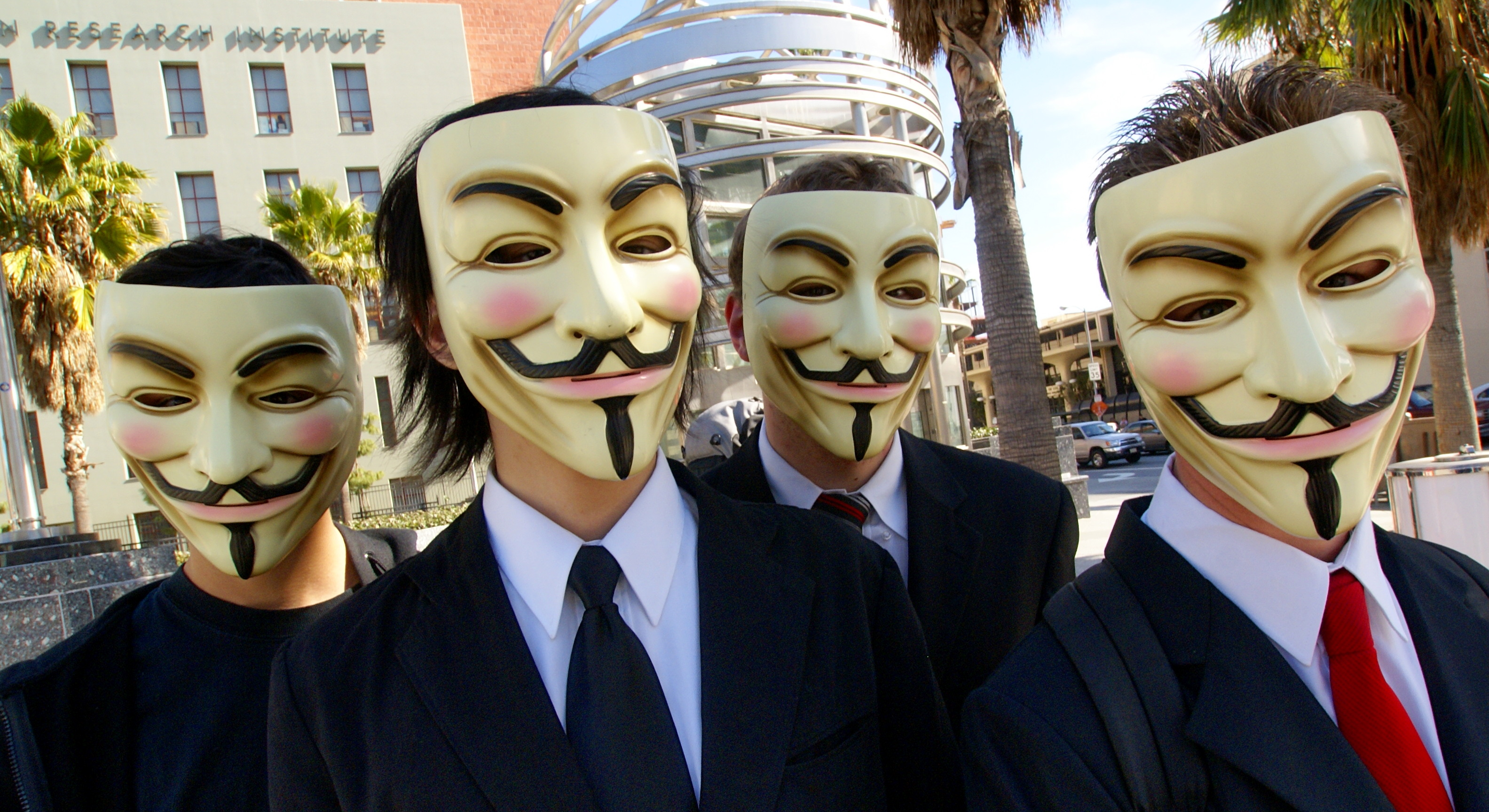
V for Vendetta used the image of Guy Fawkes for the leader of resistance to a fictional police state. This image is now used in the real world by groups such as Anonymous.

Fictional resistance movements and groups commonly appear in dystopian fiction, opposing tyranny.

== Literature ==
In Chuck Palahniuk's Fight Club, the tyranny is the soul-destroying life of modern western society. The protagonist rebels against this by organising atavistic bare-knuckle fights and then by leading Project Mayhem to destroy civilization. This story developed themes of alienation and anti-consumerism seen in earlier works such as Rebel without a Cause and The Prisoner.

== List of fictional resistance movements ==
- Alice — An ex-employee of the Umbrella Corporation turned anti-Umbrella fighter willing to take down and destroy the evil megacorporation responsible for the Global T-Virus outbreak in Resident Evil.
- Alliance to Restore the Republic — In the Star Wars original trilogy, the Alliance to Restore the Republic, more commonly known as Rebel Alliance; is a military force that wishes to depose Emperor Palpatine and restore the Republic.
- Blake's 7 — rebels against the Terran Federation in Blake's 7.
- The Brotherhood — the opposition to The Party in George Orwell's Nineteen-Eighty Four.
- Chaos Insurgency — a splinter group of the SCP Foundation, created by a rogue task force that went A.W.O.L. with several SCP objects in 1924 and has been fighting the Foundation since.
- Maquis — resistance to the Cardassians in Star Trek.
- The Mephi — rebels getting ready to revolt against OneState in We by Evgeny Zamyatin.
- Merry Men — mythical English band of outlaws led by Robin Hood opposed to the Sheriff of Nottingham in English folklore.
- The Order of the Phoenix, Dumbledore's Army – underground resistance to Voldemort and his Death Eaters in Harry Potter and the Deathly Hallows by J. K. Rowling.
- Pulang Araw, Vendetta, Task Force Agila-a trio of resistance movements under the leadership of Cardo Dalisay, President Oscar Hidalgo, and Romulo Dumagit in opposition to drug and business syndicate leaders, corrupt and greedy politicians and tycoons, power-hungry and avaricious elites, murderous terrorists and warlords, even unscrupulous and wicked policemen responsible for putting the Philippines under their despotic and totalitarian rule in FPJ's Ang Probinsyano.
- La Résistance — movement of the children of South Park, Colorado opposing the United States' war against Canada as instigated by Mothers Against Canada in South Park: Bigger, Longer & Uncut.
- The Resistance — network of humans and vortigaunts fighting the Combine in Half-Life 2.
- The Resistance — the private military force that wishes to depose the Supreme Leader and restore the New Republic in the Star Wars sequel trilogy.
- Song Jiang — leader of outlaws during the Song dynasty and fictionalized in the Water Margin.
- Wartwood Resistance — A movement of the residents of Wartwood Swamp, led by Sasha Waybright, Captain Grime and later Anne Boonchuy, to depose the tyrannical King Andrias in the third season of Amphibia.
- The X-Men franchise: Magneto sets up two resistance movements to counter Humanity's intentions to enslave &/or destroy Mutants. One of these is "The Brotherhood of Mutants", the other is "Acolytes". Magneto has led both groups in battle many times. In one firefight, Magneto attacked Alctraz Island because the US Military held a mutant that had the power to neutralize any and all mutants' powers, and used him to "cure" mutant kind.
- The Resistance (The V Franchise) – a human group who fights the Reptilian aliens that invaded Earth under false pretenses.
- The 5th Column (The V Franchise) – a group of Reptilian aliens who sided against the Reptilian invasion forces and who fight on Humanity's side.

== See also ==
- Fictional secret societies
- Terrorism in fiction
