= The Doomies =

- Genre: Horror comedy Supernatural horror Animated sitcom
- Created by: Andrés Fernandez; Henry Gifford; Rémi "Pozla" Zaarour
- Directed by: Andrés Fernandez
- Voices of: Max Mittelman; Madison Calderon; Noel Gibson; Jon Bailey
- Theme music composer: Vincent Artaud
- Composers: Vincent Artaud (score); Stefan Bossard (songs)
- Countries of origin: France; United States
- Original language: English
- No. of seasons: 1
- No. of episodes: 22

Production
- Executive producer: Calvin Dyson
- Producer: Marc du Pontavice
- Running time: 22 minutes
- Production companies: Xilam Animation; Disney Television Animation (Note: Uncredited)

Original release
- Network: Disney+ Disney Channel
- Release: June 26, 2026 – present

The Doomies is a animated horror sitcom created by director Andrés Fernandez, head writer Henry Gifford and art director Rémi Zaarour, and produced by French animation studio Xilam in association with Disney Television Animation. The show follows best friends Bobby and Romy, whose serene coastal town is transformed into a hotbed of monstrous activity after they accidentally open a portal to the underworld. Media outlets have characterized the series as a spiritual successor to Gravity Falls (2012–2016).

The Doomies debuted on Disney+ on June 26, 2026 and aired on Disney Channel internationally on October 12, 2026.

== Voice cast ==
- Max Mittelman as Bobby Lafrousse
- Madison Calderon as Romy Rodriguez, Romy's sisters
- Noel Gibson as Kim, Margot Mallory
- Jon Bailey as Doug, Maël Lezemarc
- Zehra Fazal as Jenny Lafrousse, Romy's Mother, Grannies
- Debra Wilson as Mordam
- Artt Butler as Romy's Dad
- Jake Green as Killjoy, Redwid
- Jessica Pennington as Susan Lafrousse, Mayor Mallory
- Bruce Sherfield as Additional voices
- Barbara Weber-Scaff as Additional voices

== Episodes ==
All episodes are directed by Andres Fernandez.

No.	Title	Written by	Storyboarded by	Original release date
1	"Crepe Day"	Henry Gifford	Andrés Fernandez	June 26, 2026
Best friends Bobby and Romy record themselves as The Doomies, a duo that hunt the paranormal in the town of Ouimper, located in Brittany, France. Despite lacking followers, they enjoy what they do. They later encounter a large rock that seems to curse Bobby before they flee to Bobby's aunt Jenny's cafe. Shortly afterwards, Bobby's arm begins to glow as a strange fog monster suddenly appears. The monster is after Bobby who seeks Romy's help, but she is concerned about the lighthouse keeper Doug, who seems connected somehow. The two friends try to defeat the fog monster with horns, but a mysterious woman suddenly appears and kills the monster for them. Bobby and Romy think they are safe, but the former realizes he is still cursed.
2	"The Twerpminator"	Sandrine Joly	Yoann Hervo & Olivier Pouchelon	June 26, 2026
The stone in the woods creates a swamp monster to hunt Bobby. While he and Romy go exploring, they encounter the woman from the other day who seems hellbent on wanting to catch Bobby, but manage to outrun her. At Jenny's, they meet with Doug who talks about Bobby's curse and reveals that the woman, named Kim, is a creation of his meant to be the "Chosen One" to defeat monsters and has mistaken Bobby for one. Bobby and Romy go looking for the new monster, which has taken up residence at their school. Kim follows them and they manage to defeat it, while also destroying the building. Kim agrees to leave Bobby alone, but she keeps a close eye on him by living a trailer next door to him.
3	"Bad Connection"	Gene Laufenberg	Amaury Allaire & Louis Musso	June 26, 2026
Doug tasks the Doomies with locating the Ragata Rock which can help with removing Bobby's curse. Kim insists on working alone, so Bobby and Romy look for it on their own. They must also take their teacher Mr. Fondue's online course simultaneously due to the school having been destroyed. Bobby, Romy, and Kim ultimately meet underneath the town and find the Ragata Rock, surrounded by eggs that each small parasitic creatures. Despite the rock breaking, the three manage to collect it and escape the caves before killing the creatures. Mr. Fondue ends up cancelling his classes due to an embarrassing incident. Kim finally shows appreciation for Bobby and Romy.
4	"Nosfera...Who?"	Alice Boucherit	Sébastien D'Abrigeon & Johanna Huck	June 26, 2026
Bobby and Romy take Kim around town to look for more strange things, ultimately coming to a cemetery. Before they can examine it, Bobby is called to the cafe. Jenny has a date with a man named Maël Lezemarc, whom Bobby immediately deduces is a vampire. Bobby tells Romy, who doesn't believe him, but they join Jenny and Maël's date. After going to his house, Bobby sees that Maël's last name is actually Cramezel, confirming his suspicion, but Jenny has had enough and rebuffs him. Bobby and Romy join Kim at the cemetery and accidentally release more vampires, causing Maël to go and get Jenny. It turns out that Maël wants nothing to do with his family and wants to live a normal life. Working together, they kill Maël's family with sunlight. Bobby allows Maël to continue seeing Jenny. Later, Maël is able to translate the Ragata Rock for Doug.
5	"This Party Is Dead"	Baljeet Rai	Fabrice Guével & Lucas Pinatel	June 26, 2026
During Noz an Anaon, Bobby and Romy have trouble finding Kim. When Doug joins them, the group discover that Kim may have had an identity crisis after happening upon a video of Doug admitting that Kim was a being created specifically to hunt monsters. Knowing that she would be somewhere near monsters, the group locate a goblin who tells them of a party at the edge of town. After being helped by a Yan-gant-y-tan (who later turns on them after finding out they aren't real monsters), the group find the party being held by Groac'h who plans to sacrifice Kim. They manage to convince her to fight back as the Groac'h plans to sacrifice Bobby instead for Mordam, whom the monsters all fear and decide to leave the party for. Kim manages to defeat Groac'h, but refuses to forgive Doug for what he said.
6	"Night of the Fishing Dead"	Andrés Fernandez & Henry Gifford	Andrés Fernandez & Laury Rovelli	June 26, 2026
The stone in the woods is revealed to contain Mordam, who unleashes a new monster: the Fisher King. To situate her as a proper "teen", Bobby and Romy invite Kim to an arcade, where she has trouble fitting in. The group also encounter Margot Mallory, daughter of the mayor, and her clique who all look down on the Doomies. Romy becomes self-conscious and tries to get them to like her and her friends. Everyone sans the group leaves, just as the Fisher King's zombie fish appear. The group is forced to barricade themselves though eventually, the fish break in and begin turning Margot and her clique into fish zombies. The rest escape, but the Fisher King captures Bobby as Kim is slowly turned. Working together, Bobby and Romy manage to defeat the Fisher King, restoring everyone to normal, though Margot and her friends don't remember anything. Romy continues to appreciate Bobby and Kim. Note: This episode had its premiere at the 2026 Annecy Film Festival.
7	"The Missing Link"	Olivier Pouchelon & Cedric Stephan	Fabrice Guével & Lucas Pinatel	June 26, 2026
The Doomies meet at the docks to go to a nearby island, which contains something they need to remove Mordam's curse from Bobby. Romy, wanting to prove she can lead, uses a answer toy to make their decisions. On the island, Romy incompetently leads Bobby and Kim through the island, while also avoiding another of Mordam's monsters. Bobby eventually learns that Romy has been using a toy and berates her. Romy comes to her senses when Kim gives a "pep talk" to her. They defeat the monster and find an ancient cup that belonged to Mordam, but Bobby touches it. Doug informs them that Bobby's soul is now tied to Mordam.
8	"Momster"	Violaine Briat	Amaury Allaire & Louis Musso	June 26, 2026
With Bobby's soul in danger, the Doomies decide to let him stay at home for the time being. Not wanting to be alone, Bobby uses one of Doug's artifacts to summon a monster that takes the form of his mother Susan, dubbed Momster. Momster is baffled by Bobby's resignation, but soon becomes endeared to him and starts to spend time with him around town. Romy becomes suspicious and learns the truth, but Momster is convinced that Romy hasn't been supportive of Bobby and a chase ensues. Bobby apologizes for putting everyone in this situation and Romy and Momster encourage him to call Susan for real. Bobby learns that she will be coming home in a few days. Momster leaves, but not before giving them a spell that will lift the curse.
9	"Shadow of a Doubt"	Julien Dinse	Sébastien D'Abrigeon & Johanna Huck	June 26, 2026
Doug is able to translate the spell, but while he prepares, Bobby, Romy, and Kim must go and collect the ingredients, the last of which is coal in a cave. Mordam sends shadow monsters after them and race against time as the sun sets. Doug performs the spell on Bobby, while Romy and Kim fend off the shadow creatures with all the lights they have. Despite Bobby becoming possessed and taunting Doug, he manages to complete the spell, thus removing Bobby's curse. As the group celebrates, the rock in the woods containing Mordam suddenly breaks as she is freed.
10	"Knight Terrors"	James Huntrods	Amaury Allaire & Louis Mussi	June 26, 2026
Mordam unleashes ghost knights to go after Kim. While Doug and Kim go celebrate, Bobby and Romy both head home. Bobby later sees the ghost knights and texts Romy while heading to the cafe to get Doug and Kim. The three are attacked by the ghosts as they run back to the lighthouse. Romy is with her family and informs them about the ghosts, but they don't believe her until they arrive at her place. The Rodriguezes attempt to flee to Belgium, but Romy convinces them to return to town, after they crash. Doug deduces that the knights' remains are the school, which is still under construction. Everyone gathers as Doug uses his spell to send all the ghosts back. Romy's parents allow her to continue helping the Doomies as Mordam unleashes her power.
11	"Happy Doomsday Everyone"	Baljeet Rai	Fabrice Guével & Lucas Pinatel	June 26, 2026
Bobby learns that Susan is coming soon just as the Doomies prepare to face Mordam. Kim decides to face her directly, Doug believes he is being visited by his deceased master via his crepes, while Bobby and Romy decide to stick to the original plan of using the lighthouse's light to project a spell onto Mordam. However, clouds, force the two to remove the light and take it into the woods. Doug's master gives him advice on how to defeat Mordam, but he uncertain if he can do it. The Doomies gather to face Mordam with Doug using his powers for the first time to face her. Mordam is depowered, but she has opened a portal to Subterra, forcing Doug to close the portal from the other side and supposedly defeating Mordam. Bobby is reunited with Susan, Romy returns to her family (while also adopting living skeletons), Kim moves into the lighthouse, and Doug is revealed to still be alive in Subterra.
12	"Hair Raising"	James Huntrods	Sébastien D'Abrigeon & Johanna Huck	June 26, 2026
Bobby and Romy are having difficulty finding new threats to face, until Kim appears and reveals that not only has she fought a werewolf, but that she has been bitten by the same one. The two suspect that she misses Doug, but she refuses to admit to, or even mention it. They eventually find the one who bit her, another teenager named Pierre who seems to get Kim to open up. Before Bobby and Romy can perform the spell to cure her, Kim and Pierre transform. After a chase to the beach, they perform the spell and revert the two to normal. Kim finally admits that she has mixed feelings on Doug, but that she does miss him. It is later revealed that Mordam's spirit is still tied to Bobby, but he is unafraid of her as she is still powerless.
13	"Terror Cruise"	Alice Boucherit & Cedric Stephan	Fabrice Guével & Arthur Peltzer	June 26, 2026
Kim decides to respect Doug's wishes by trying to act like a normal teenager. Romy tries to convince Bobby that they should resume monster hunting and come across Doug's car which now appears sentient. Believing that Doug has possessed it, they take it for a joyride and encounter mysterious cracks opening across Ouimper. The car seemingly attacks Romy, whose personality becomes more careless and hellbent on traveling in the car. When Bobby is kicked out, he suspects something is wrong and realizes that the car has been possessed by an evil spirit. As Romy plans to leave town for good, Bobby and Romy's skeletons trick the car into going to a junkyard where Bobby attempts to appeal to Romy's emotions. Kim arrives to help and they manage to rescue Romy and destroy the car. Meanwhile, Mayor Mallory has been forcing her workers to dig for a strange material.
14	"Lighthouse of Horrors"	Violaine Briat	Amaury Allaire & Lucas Pinatel	June 26, 2026
To help Kim become accustomed to adolescence, Bobby and Romy suggest throwing a part at the lighthouse. Kim leaves them to the task while she tries to take care of some sinister mermaids that have appeared. This ends up being more so that Kim does not have to face other people, which has made her nervous. Bobby and Romy keep finding ways to expand the party as more teenagers arrive. Eventually, the mermaids arrive to wreck the party, only for a mysterious individual to arrive and destroy them all. Despite Kim not being there, the teens thank her for the night. The mysterious person turns out to be the new light keeper, Killjoy.
15	"Season of the Witch"	Joshua Pruett	Sébastien D'Abrigeon & Johanna Huck	June 26, 2026
Killjoy puts Kim to training and has Bobby and Romy serve in a custodial capacity. While the tweens initially support it, they quickly tire of Killjoy's methods. When the local grannies are transformed into witches, Killjoy insists on their destruction, while Bobby and Romy ask that they be saved. The witches kidnap Romy's younger sisters so that they can drain their youth as everyone races to rescue them. When Killjoy insists on taking out the witches by any means necessary (even if it harms the kids), Kim turns on him. Bobby, Romy, and Kim manage to rescue the sisters and revert the grannies to normal. Killjoy returns to the lighthouse and creates a new Kim.
16	"Residence Evil"	Joshua Pruett	Fabrice Guével & Arthur Peltzer	June 26, 2026
While Kim tries dating (thinking she was meeting people for "matches"), Romy convinces Bobby for them to visit the house of her idol Edward Grimkin, who designed all the tourist brochures for Ouimper. The house is haunted by spirits, but the two quickly find themselves aided by Killjoy's Kim, nicknamed Kim 2. The eventually encounter the spirit of Grimkin, who is revealed to have found the spell that allows one to control all evil in Ouimper. Romy's idolization is shattered and the group works together to undo the spell that awakened the evil in Grimkin's house, sending him away for good, though not before he warns them of the dangers to come. Bobby and Romy quickly run off to help Kim, whose dates were not going well, while Kim 2 heads home.
17	"Sub-Terror"	James Huntrods	Fabrice Guével & Arthur Peltzer	June 26, 2026
Kim begins hearing Doug in her dreams and is convinced that he is reaching out to her. Bobby and Romy become suspicious of some of the construction people's behavior and decide to tail them. Doug uses his energy to open a portal for Kim, sending her to the "In-Between" before she finds an entrance to Subterra. She finds Doug, who has since married a monster named Myrrh, and rescues the two of them, returning them to Earth. Bobby and Romy end up at an abandoned fish canning factory that is secretly a lab being run by Mayor Mallory. She has been excavating a material (dubbed "Eviltanium") and plans to use it to control the masses via their phones. Bobby and Romy manage to escape with the former reluctantly allowing Mordam to briefly take control to help them.
18	"Mind Games"	Baljeet Rai	Amaury Allaire & Fabrice Guével	June 26, 2026
Bobby and Romy are shocked to see Doug back, along with his new bride Myrrh, after Kim rescued them, and inform him about Killjoy. Bobby visits Susan. She tells him that she is leaving again for her book tour, but wants to bring him along, conflicting him. Doug confronts Killjoy and challenges him to a board game to determine who will take over the lighthouse. Bobby accidentally joins the game and Romy also joins. When Killjoy learns about Myrrh, he sends Kim 2 after her, with Kim trying to stop her. Eventually, Kim and Myrrh get through to Kim 2 and head back. Killjoy appears to dominate the game, but one of the curses of the game reveals that Killjoy was cheating this whole time, sucking him into the game. He returns as a spider monster and attacks the group with Kim 2 being destroyed. Bobby, disgusted with how things have been going, kills Killjoy, ending the game. Bobby tells Susan he is not going with her as a possessed constable appears.
19	"Nevermore"	Baljeet Rai	Amaury Allaire & Fabrice Guével	June 26, 2026
The Doomies run from the possessed citizens and try to hide with the group convincing Doug to call upon the Council of Light Keepers to aid them, much to his chagrin. Meanwhile, Margot's phone breaks after she is shocked to see the Doomies doing well on social media. She searches the town for a new phone, only to be stymied and oblivious to what is happening. The Doomies meet the Council (who have taken the form of ravens) put the group on trial for their own misgivings. They reveal that Bobby still has the spirit of Mordam within him, angering Romy who feels betrayed by his dishonesty. The Council judge that they have their memories erased and the group flee with Romy being taken, Bobby has Mordam take over to rescue Romy, but her mind has been wiped, save for her family. As the Doomies flee, Mordam destroys the Council as she takes Bobby's body completely. Margot finds her mother in control of the Eviltanium.
20	"The Kids Are All Fight"	Alice Boucherit & Cedric Stephan	Sébastien D'Abrigeon & Johanna Huck	June 26, 2026
Doug, Kim, and Myrrh resolve to find Bobby and rescue him from Mordam. In the meantime, Mordam attempts to completely break Bobby by damaging his relationship with Susan (which fails) and Jenny (which succeeds). Romy is happily spending time with her family when Margot arrives asking her for help. Not knowing what is wrong with her, Margot takes Romy to go search for Bobby, eventually finding him, and unaware of his possession. Mordam takes the two into the sewers with the intent to sacrifice their souls to unleash a demon. Eventually, Mordam unveils her plan and restores Romy's memory to humiliate her. Margot manages to stave Mordam, long enough for Romy to forgive Bobby and hug him, allowing Bobby to regain control of his body and expel Mordam for good. Doug, Kim, and Myrrh reunite with the group as they vow to Margot that they will stop her mother.
21	"Scream Time"	James Huntrods	Sébastien D'Abrigeon & Johanna Huck	June 26, 2026
Due to the Eviltanium being in people's phones, the Doomies resolve to jam her signal using Doug's outdated computer. Bobby starts to become jealous of Romy and Margot quickly bonding as he himself doesn't trust Margot for being the Mayor's daughter. The group collaborate to arrive at the abandoned fish factory, encountering Mayor Mallory's unturned assistant Redwid who allows them to enter. Working together, the group fight their way through Mallory's forces, but she turns Kim and Myrrh and attempts to use Doug's mind to increase her power. Bobby has Margot pretend to side with her mother so that she can activate Doug's computer jamming the signal and stopping her. Mallory awakens to have no memory of being mayor, but a new spell is activated as Redwid is revealed to be a sorcerer who suddenly plots to rule the universe.
22	"Grand Designs"	Joshua Pruett	Fabrice Guével & Arthur Peltzer	June 26, 2026
The Doomies confront Redwid who reveals that everything starting from Bobby's curse was planned by him to bring him into power. He is one of many Redwids and claims to know how everything will turn out. He captures Kim, as Doug and Myrrh go to look for someway to stop Redwid, while Bobby and Romy get everyone out of town. Jenny, finally realizing that Bobby's adventures were real, agrees to leave town with the rest of the residents. The Doomies rescue Kim from her trap, but this was part of Redwid's plan who absorbs his alternate selves to break this dimension apart. The Doomies escape to the In-Between, but after seeing their followers support them, they head back with a plan. Bobby, Romy, Kim, and Doug battle Redwid, ultimately sending him into an infinitely dark universe, and reverting the world to normal. As the four rest, they see that Ouimper looks different and come to realize that they are in a different dimension in a town called "Doompier".

=== Shorts ===
The shorts, which most likely take place during the first half of the season, feature Bobby and Romy filming their supernatural hunting exploits around Ouimper. The shorts were dropped under the Extras feature on Disney+, but were later posted via Disney Channel Animation's official YouTube page.

No.	Title	Original release date
1	"Creepy Crepe"	June 26, 2026
Bobby and Romy summon a demon that possesses a crepe.
2	"Doug Unfiltered"	June 26, 2026
Bobby and Romy leave their phone filming Doug's off time at the lighthouse.
3	"Ghosted by a Ghost"	June 26, 2026
Bobby and Romy attempt to interview a ghost, but she instead finds them annoying.
4	"What Is That Thing?"	June 26, 2026
Bobby and Romy witness Kim battling a large monster.

==== How NOT to Draw (2026) ====
A series of shorts where a certain character from a Disney property, mainly a Disney Channel show, would usually do certain shenanigans as they request from the animator or the artist.

No.	Title	Original release date
1	"Bobby & Romy Help the Animator Fight an Evil Force"	August 17, 2026

==== Chibi Tiny Tales (2026) ====
No.	Title	Original release date
1	"The Crepe Escape"	September 19, 2026
2	"Mime Time"	September 26, 2026
3	"Fright House"	October 3, 2026

== Development ==
The show was first announced alongside Dragon Striker by Disney at Annecy International Animation Film Festival in 2022. An exclusive first look was released before the show hosted an Annecy Work in Progress session on June 12 at 11:30am. The series was originally titled Bobby and Daria and the Creatures of Doom. Like Dragon Striker, The Doomies is a French co-production with The Walt Disney Company EMEA. Creator Andrés Fernandez stated that the main inspirations for the series was Ghostbusters and The Goonies, and described the series as "[The] Evil Dead for kids".

On June 11, 2025, Xilam CEO Marc du Pontavice stated that Disney had "a lot of faith" in the series and that a second season was potentially in pre-production.
