= List of Amphibia characters =

Fictional characters

A screenshot of the intro of the third season of Amphibia, featuring multiple characters from the series. L/R: Archie, Ms. Croaker, Wally, Loggle, Grime, Sasha, Anne, Andrias, Marcy, Polly, Sprig, Mrs. Boonchuy, Hop Pop, Mr. Boonchuy, and Domino the cat

The animated series Amphibia features various characters created by Matt Braly. The series centers on Anne Boonchuy, who, along with her friends Sasha and Marcy, is transported to the world of Amphibia after opening a mysterious music box. Anne is adopted by the Plantar family, consisting of the adventurous Sprig, feisty Polly, and the wise Hop Pop, as they go on adventures and face numerous dangers. Much of the show revolves around Anne interacting with the residents of Wartwood, who are initially hostile towards her, but over time welcome her as one of them.

This is a list of the characters that appear in this show.

== Overview ==
Character	Voiced by	Appearances				
Character	Voiced by	First	Season 1	Season 2	Season 3	Shorts
Main characters
Anne Boonchuy	Brenda Song	"Anne or Beast?"	Main	Main	Main	Main
Hopediah "Hop Pop" Plantar	Bill Farmer	"Anne or Beast?"	Main	Main	Main	Main
Sprig Plantar	Justin Felbinger	"Anne or Beast?"	Main	Main	Main	Main
Polly Plantar	Amanda Leighton	"Anne or Beast?"	Main	Main	Main	Main
Sasha Waybright	Anna Akana	"Best Fronds"	Recurring	Main	Main	Guest
Marcy Wu	Haley Tju	"Best Fronds"	Guest	Main	Main	Guest
Captain Grime	Troy Baker	"Best Fronds"	Recurring	Main	Main	
King Andrias Leviathan	Keith David	"Marcy at the Gates"		Recurring	Main	
The Core / King Aldrich	William Houston (King Aldrich's voice); Haley Tju (as Darcy)	"The First Temple"		Guest	Main	
Wartwood Swamp Inhabitants
Mayor Frodrick Toadstool	Stephen Root	"Anne or Beast?"	Recurring	Recurring	Recurring	Recurring
Toadie	Jack McBrayer	"Anne or Beast?"	Recurring	Recurring	Recurring	Recurring
Sadie Croaker	Laila Berzins	"Anne or Beast?"	Recurring	Recurring	Recurring	Recurring
Walliam "Wally" Ribbiton	James Patrick Stuart	"Anne or Beast?"	Recurring	Recurring	Recurring	Recurring
Maddie Flour	Jill Bartlett	"Hop Luck"	Recurring	Recurring	Recurring	Recurring
Ivy Sundew	Katie Crown	"Dating Season"	Recurring	Recurring	Recurring	
Felicia Sundew	Kaitlyn Robrock	"Anne or Beast?"	Recurring	Recurring	Recurring	Recurring
Sylvia Sundew	Mona Marshall	"Hop Pop and Lock"	Guest	Guest	Guest	
Leopold Loggle	Brian Maillard	"Anne or Beast?"	Recurring	Recurring	Recurring	
Mr. Flour	Kevin Michael Richardson	"Anne or Beast?"	Recurring	Recurring	Guest	
Stumpy	John DiMaggio	"Lily Pad Thai"	Recurring	Recurring	Recurring	
Soggy Joe	Fred Tatasciore	"Anne Vs. Wild"	Guest	Recurring	Guest	
Albus Duckweed	Kevin McDonald	"Dating Game"	Recurring	Recurring	Recurring	
Rosemary, Ginger, & Lavender Flour	Eden Riegel; Marlow Barkley; Mia Allan; Ella Allan	"Civil Wart"	Guest	Recurring	Guest	
Tuti	April Winchell	"Girl Time"	Guest	Guest	Guest	
Chuck	Matt Braly	"Toad Tax"	Recurring	Recurring	Recurring	
Gunther	Chris Sullivan	"Croak & Punishment"	Guest	Guest		
Sheriff Buck Leatherleaf	James Adomian	"Girl Time"	Guest	Guest	Guest	
Toad Tower Inhabitants
Bog	Darin De Paul	"Toad Tax"	Guest	Guest	Guest	
Fens	April Winchell	"Toad Tax"	Guest	Guest	Guest	
Percy	Matt Jones	"Prison Break"	Recurring	Recurring		Guest
Braddock	Kristen Johnston; April Winchell	"Prison Break"	Recurring	Recurring		
Captain Bufo	Daisuke Tsuji	"Barrel's Warhammer"		Guest	Guest	
Captain Beatrix	Aisling Bea	"Barrel's Warhammer"		Guest	Recurring	
Captain Aldo	Ron Cephas Jones	"Barrel's Warhammer"		Guest		
Newtopia Inhabitants
General Yunan	Zehra Fazal	"Toadcatcher"		Recurring	Recurring	
Lady Olivia	Michelle Dockery	"Marcy at the Gates"		Recurring	Recurring	
Barley, Branson and Blair	Sam Riegel	"Marcy at the Gates"		Guest	Guest	
Gertie	Nicole Byer	"Scavenger Hunt"		Guest	Guest	
Bella the Bellhop	Kristen Schaal	"The Plantars Check In"		Guest	Guest	
Sal	Maurice LaMarche	"Little Frogtown"		Guest		
Priscilla "The Killa" Paddock	Misty Lee	"Hopping Mall"		Guest	Guest	
Pearl Paddock	Romi Dames	"Hopping Mall"		Guest		
Los Angeles Inhabitants
Mrs. Boonchuy	On Braly	"Family Fishing Trip"	Guest	Guest	Main	
Mr. Boonchuy	Brian Sounalath	"The New Normal"			Main	
Dr. Jan	Anika Noni Rose	"Fight at the Museum"			Recurring	
Ally and Jess	Melissa Villaseñor; Dana Davis	"Fixing Frobo"			Recurring	
Terri	Kate Micucci	"If You Give a Frog a Cookie"			Recurring	
Mr. X	RuPaul	"Mr. X"			Recurring	
Robert Otto	Brad Garrett	"Spider-Sprig"			Guest	
Dr. Frakes	Cree Summer	"If You Give a Frog a Cookie"			Guest	
Maggie	Eden Riegel	"Reunion"	Guest		Guest	
Gabby	Jessica McKenna	"Hop Til You Drop"			Guest	
Ned	Wayne Knight	"Thai Feud"			Guest	
Molly Jo	Cassie Glow	"Spider-Sprig"			Recurring	
Humphrey Westwood	Wallace Shawn	"Hollywood Hop Pop"			Recurring	
Others
Valeriana	Susanne Blakeshee	"Bizarre Bazaar"	Guest	Guest	Guest	
Tritonio Espada	Matt Chapman	"Combat Camp"	Guest		Recurring	
Barry	Keith Silverstein	"Cursed!"	Guest		Guest	
Apothecary Gary	Tony Hale	"Children of the Spore"	Guest		Recurring	
Crumpet the Frog	Matt Vogel (as Kermit the Frog)	"Swamp and Sensibility"		Guest		
Curator Ponds	Alex Hirsch	"Wax Museum"		Guest		
Leif Lily Plantar	Cassandra Lee Morris	"The Sleepover to End All Sleepovers"		Guest	Recurring	
Barrel Barrel the Brave	Jason Ritter	"The Sleepover to End All Sleepovers"		Guest	Guest	
Lysil and Angwin	Laila Berzins; Chris Wylde	"Quarreler's Pass"		Guest	Guest	
Parisia	Rachel House	"Olm Town Road"			Guest	
Mother Olm	Whoopi Goldberg	"Mother of Olms"			Recurring	
The Guardian	Lo Mutac (Note: Credited as Charlyne Yi)	"The Hardest Thing"			Guest	

== Main ==
=== Anne Boonchuy ===
Anne Savisa Boonchuy (Thai: แอนน์ สาวิสา บุญช่วย; voiced by Brenda Song) is a self-assured, adventurous, and fearless Thai-American human girl originally from Los Angeles, California, who, on her 13th birthday, gets magically transported to Amphibia alongside Sasha and Marcy after opening a mysterious chest known as the Calamity Box. Separated from Sasha and Marcy, Anne would be taken in by the Plantars, making her home at their hometown, Wartwood. Anne eventually reunited with Sasha, but under acrimonious circumstances as the two end up fighting at Toad Tower. She then reunited with Marcy, but ultimately had to choose between staying in Wartwood with the Plantars, or in Newtopia with Marcy. Her encounters with both girls eventually took a dark turn when Sasha attempted to betray her, and Andrias revealed Marcy was the reason the girls were transported to Amphibia. Anne was sent home with the Plantars, but would return to Amphibia to fight Andrias, and eventually the Core.

=== Sprig Plantar ===
Sprig Plantar
- First appearance: "Anne or Beast?" (2019)
- Last appearance: "The Hardest Thing" (2022)
- Created by: Matt Braly
- Voiced by: Justin Felbinger (TV series); Thurop Van Orman (pilot)
- Age: 10 (debut); 11 (as of "Sprig's Birthday")

In-universe information
- Species: Poison dart frog
- Family: Hop Pop Plantar (grandfather); Polly Plantar (younger sister); Unnamed mother (deceased); Unnamed father (deceased); Anne Boonchuy (adoptive sister)

Sprig Plantar is a pink poison dart frog and Anne's best friend. He is adventurous and energetic, qualities which can get him into adventure and trouble. Despite acting carelessly at times, he is loyal to his friends and family and seeks to do what is right. He was the first person to befriend Anne and showed the most sympathy towards her plight; having to convince Hop Pop to take her in. Despite being very close with Anne, he still prefers his own personal space and has admitted that he has no romantic interest in her. While he can be at odds with Hop Pop, Sprig does care about him and likes spending time with him. Sprig also has a sibling rivalry with Polly, but is also protective of her. Early in the first season, Sprig gets roped into an arranged marriage with Maddie Flour which they ultimately break off, with Sprig realizing that Maddie is cool despite her personality. He develops a closer relationship with Ivy Sundew, whom he has known since childhood. He initially saw her as a friend, but slowly fell in love with her and has since tried impressing her. They become a couple by the end of the season. When Sasha returns and pushes her influence on Anne, Sprig steps up for her, telling her that Anne deserved better and that she had been a terrible friend to her.

In season two, Sprig and his family travel with Anne to Newtopia to look for clues regarding the Calamity Box. While on the road, Sprig displays natural hunting skills, which he teaches to Anne, as well as perfect vocal mimicry. Upon arriving in Newtopia, the group meets Marcy and Sprig becomes highly suspicious of her and protective of Anne due to their past meeting with Sasha. However, he ultimately accepts her as a friend. Sprig is also revealed to be smart to a certain degree, as he was immediately accepted into Newtopia University despite his age, but later drops out due to the pressure. In "Hopping Mall", he tells Anne that he does not remember his mom as he was young, news which brings him and Anne closer together. Upon returning to Wartwood, he begins to openly date Ivy Sundew. In "True Colors", he, his family, and Anne fight Andrias, and accompany Anne back to her home in Los Angeles.

In season three, Sprig and his family join Anne when she is transported back to Los Angeles. He becomes particularly obsessed with being considered a Boonchuy as Anne is considered a Plantar. He is revealed to be a natural in Sepak takraw. He turns 11 in "Sprig's Birthday" and further reveals that his parents gave him his signature hat. In "Spider-Sprig", he tries to become a superhero named Frog-Man, but gives up after realizing that he was simply seeking attention. Sprig eventually returns to Amphibia with Anne and his family. He resumes his relationship with Ivy, much to everyone's annoyance, but when the two of them nearly ruin a mission, they decide to pull it back a bit. He also overcomes his prejudice with Grime and begins to take fighting advice from him. Sprig becomes instrumental in defeating Andrias after reading him a letter he found that came from Leif, which is enough to invoke a feeling of regret within the disgraced king - enough to drive him to tears.

After Anne saves Amphibia from the Core, Sprig finally accepts that she will have to leave Amphibia for good and says farewell to her. In the epilogue, he has devoted himself to becoming an adventurer and prepares to travel to a new continent alongside Ivy.

=== Hopediah "Hop Pop" Plantar ===
Hopediah "Hop Pop" Plantar
- First appearance: "Anne or Beast?" (2019)
- Last appearance: "The Hardest Thing" (2022)
- Created by: Matt Braly
- Voiced by: Bill Farmer; Jack Ferraiolo (as "Wrecker")
- Age: 68

In-universe information
- Species: Poison dart frog
- Family: Sprig Plantar (grandson); Polly Plantar (granddaughter); Unnamed son/son-in-law (deceased); Unnamed daughter/daughter-in-law (deceased); Anne Boonchuy (adoptive granddaughter)

Hopediah "Hop Pop" Plantar is an orange poison dart frog who is Sprig and Polly's grandfather and Anne's adoptive grandfather. He is very protective of his grandkids, and was initially unsure of taking Anne in due to her strange anatomy. However, he learns to welcome her after she owns up to accidentally breaking his cane. Hop Pop is prone to be stuck in his old ways, but eventually bonds with Anne after realizing that they share a lot in common in terms of personality. He was also bossy to the kids, but learns to be open-minded when Sprig brings him humility, and is also opportunistic. He is well informed about the Calamity Box, which brought Anne and her friends to Amphibia, but feigns understanding it due to its dangerous origins. After operating as a beetle racer called "Wrecker", he buried it in his front lawn and has been hiding it from Anne since. He was initially oblivious to the Plantar family's long history of being adventurers and explorers, but did not seem all that bothered upon learning this. He had a long reciprocated love with Ivy Sundew's grandmother and Felicia Sundew's mother, Sylvia Sundew, who, upon returning to Wartwood Swamp, resumes her relationship with him. Throughout the first season, Hop Pop struggles to keep his fruit stand up and running and ends up losing it when he cannot pay his debt; effectively putting him out of a job. He fights against the system by running for Mayor against Mayor Toadstool, but loses after failing to reach out to the inhabitants outside of Wartwood Swamp. However, the Wartwood Swamp citizens build him a new stand to show their support. It is later revealed that the Toads of Toad Tower view his efforts as a threat, as they unsuccessfully try to get rid of him.

In season two, Hop Pop leads Anne and the Plantars to Newtopia in a "fwagon" (short for family wagon) and leaves their house under Chuck's care. He opts to leave the Calamity Box behind, claiming that he had a friend who was examining it. While on the road, Hop Pop displays a heroic attitude and further revels on his failed background as an actor, getting the chance to fulfill this dream, albeit with criminals. While in Newtopia, he briefly has a crisis after realizing that he is not ready for Sprig to leave him and learns from his friend Sal that he must embrace change and the future. Eventually, Anne figures out that Hop Pop had been lying to her about the Calamity Box. He soon reveals to her that he had feared losing Sprig and Polly, as years ago, herons killed their parents while he was away, and he has blamed himself for being unable to protect them. Anne forgives him for trying to hide the box and he agrees to help her continue her search for a way home. In "True Colors", Hop Pop accompanies Anne back to Los Angeles along with his grandkids.

In season three, Hop Pop and his family join Anne when she is transported back to Los Angeles. He begins to view their time in Anne's world as important and does not want to be seen as unimportant or taking advantage of the Boonchuys. He is revealed to be a natural at Khon, and befriends Humphrey Westwood, an aspiring elderly actor who resembles him. Hop Pop eventually returns to Amphibia with Anne and his family, but along with his family end up returning to Earth when Andrias starts his invasion, during which the herons that killed his family confront him. With Anne's help, he overcomes this and tames them with help from Sprig and Polly.

Following Anne saving Amphibia and her returning home alongside Sasha and Marcy, Hop Pop continues to garden and has brought some avocadoes from California to Amphibia. He is also shown to have settled down with Sylvia Sundew.

Bill Farmer, who voices Hop Pop, named the character as one of his favorite roles. He also felt he had a greater creative control on his performance as Hop Pop than other roles such as Goofy due to not being a pre-existing character.

=== Polly Plantar ===
Polly Plantar
- First appearance: "Anne or Beast?" (2019)
- Last appearance: "The Hardest Thing" (2022)
- Created by: Matt Braly
- Voiced by: Amanda Leighton
- Age: 5

In-universe information
- Species: Polliwog
- Family: Sprig Plantar (older brother); Hop Pop Plantar (grandfather); Unnamed mother (deceased); Unnamed father (deceased); Anne Boonchuy (adoptive sister); Frobo (adopted younger brother)

Polly Petunia Plantar is Sprig's outgoing and fearless polliwog sister, who loves adventure, monsters, and having fun. Despite being young, she has the heart of an explorer. Upon meeting Anne, Polly was disappointed that she was not a ferocious monster. Polly spends much of the first season as a comic foil while being viewed as a helpless child, despite displaying abilities to the contrary. She is an expert spitter and does not like situating herself in typical "girly" roles. She also has the ability to expel a powerful shriek, which she refers to as "singing". She thinks that romance is gross and loves to be in charge by displaying her cuteness. However, Polly is shown to be frightened by scary things and does not like being alone, and often needs to be saved from danger. She once claimed that she has been eaten eight times throughout her life and "looks forward to it". Nevertheless, she has gotten Anne and her family out of serious conflicts through determination and prowess.

In season two, Polly, her family, and Anne head off to Newtopia to seek answers regarding the Calamity Box. While on the road, she fears that she is considered a nuisance due to her young age, but realizes that her family loves her unconditionally. She is also shown to have the ability to conduct electricity, and have perfect vocal mimicry. Upon reaching Newtopia, Polly learns from Marcy that she will eventually grow legs in two months. She also attempts to be closer to Anne by hanging out with her, though they end up causing trouble for everyone. Sprig reveals that Polly never met their mother, as she was too little to know her. Upon returning to Wartwood, Polly gets her first taste of responsibility after taking up Frobo, a robot frog that had been following the Plantars. In "True Colors", Polly finally grows legs, though they are minuscule, and accompanies Anne back to her home in Los Angeles.

In season three, Polly and her family join Anne when she is transported back to Los Angeles. She is revealed to have picked up Thai language fluently after watching Thai rom-coms. She attempts to rebuild Frobo, but ultimately only succeeds in bringing his head back to life. However, with help from the IT Girls, she also picks up knowledge on robotics and electronics. Polly eventually returns to Amphibia with Anne and her family. She later uses her newfound electronic skills to rebuild and upgrade Frobo.

Following Anne saving Amphibia and returning home alongside Sasha and Marcy, Polly immediately grows a strand of hair. Some time later, she eventually becomes a full frog and young mechanic, though she still lacks a frog snout.

=== Sasha Waybright ===
Sasha Elizabeth Waybright
- First appearance: "Best Fronds" (2019, non-speaking cameo) "Prison Break" (2019, official debut)
- Last appearance: "The Hardest Thing" (2022)
- Created by: Matt Braly; Jack Ferraiolo
- Voiced by: Anna Akana
- Inspiration: Matt Braly's friend
- Age: 13–14 (throughout the series); 23 (epilogue of "The Hardest Thing")

In-universe information
- Species: Human
- Nationality: American; (German/Slavic heritage)

Sasha Elizabeth Waybright is a 13-year-old human girl who is Anne and Marcy's childhood friend, whom Grime captured; she eventually became his new lieutenant after proving her prowess in battle. Despite her manipulative and bossy nature, she genuinely cares for her friends. After her capture, Sasha used her persuasive abilities to have the Toads be friendly and serve her. After two giant herons attack their tower, Sasha convinces Grime to take her advice so they can defeat them in battle. Pleased with the outcome, Grime makes Sasha lieutenant, a position she hopes to use to find her friends. She eventually reunites with Anne at the end of "Anne of the Year" and reveals her connection with the Toads, inviting all of Wartwood to Toad Tower for a celebratory banquet. While Sasha is happy to be with Anne again, she reveals the motivation behind inviting Wartwood to the tower, which is to sacrifice Hop Pop due to his status as an unintentional revolutionary symbol. Sasha duels with Anne to determine Hop Pop's fate, and initially has the upper hand. However, she loses the duel when Anne stands up to her, resulting in a scar on her right cheek. After One-Eyed Wally's exploding boom-shrooms destroy the tower, Sasha begins to fall off some crumbling masonry, but Anne and the Plantars rescue her. However, she realizes she has been a terrible friend and willingly lets herself fall, but Grime saves her and takes her away.

Sometime later, Sasha tries to uphold Grime's reputation, as she is angered at his now lazy and unmotivated self. While battling General Yunan, Sasha admits that she does not want to lose Grime because he is her only friend, causing Grime to deduce that she misses Anne and believes she has permanently ruined her friendship with her. After defeating Yunan, the two decide to take over Newtopia by force. She proves her worth to the other Toad captains by helping Grime retrieve Barrel's Warhammer, during which she admits she wants to prove that she can make it on her own without Anne and Marcy after learning that they have teamed up. However, in the process, she loses Grime's remaining subordinates Percy and Braddock, who believe that she has become too harsh. Sasha and Grime later reunite with Anne, Marcy and the Plantars, claiming that they have changed and want to help. She helps out with the third temple and recharges the pink gem, causing her to lose its power. Despite having supposedly been redeemed in Anne and Marcy's eyes, she and Grime go forward with their plan, which she now seems to regret due to how it would affect Anne and Marcy if it goes through. Despite this, she denies having any sentimentality when speaking to Grime, but loses her temper after Anne and Marcy bring up her past misdeeds. She accepts that while she may not have changed yet, her friends have and must learn to cope with that. She also learns to be less in control and more supportive when she, Anne and Marcy reform their garage band, Sasha and the Sharps. She and Grime attempt to put her plan into motion, but discover Andrias' plans and attempt to stop him. She allows Anne to escape back to Los Angeles while she stays behind in Amphibia to help Grime thwart Andrias.

Sasha ends up fleeing to Wartwood with Grime, where she begins to realize her actions resulted in Marcy getting severely injured. She finds Anne's journal and, touched by how much her friendship meant to her, decides to instead lead the Wartwood citizens to fight Andrias. Between Anne teleporting to Los Angeles and returning to Wartwood, Sasha became a resistance leader in the fight against Andrias. Afraid that she will somehow ruin her friendship with Anne again, Sasha tries to pass command duties to her, but she turns out to be bad at it. Anne eventually reveals that she has renewed confidence in her to do the right thing, and Sasha takes command again. Sasha also decides that she and Anne will co-lead the resistance, and they both vow to rescue Marcy from King Andrias. Her relationship with the citizens of Wartwood has vastly improved, though she admits that she has to make difficult decisions with them. Sasha admits that she is upset with Marcy for putting them in the situation that they are in, but Anne tells her that she needs to learn to forgive, like she did with her. Thanks to this, Sasha overcomes her past and frees Marcy from the Core's control.

Sasha is eventually imbued with the power of the pink gem to help defeat the Core, but ultimately gives it to Anne so she can defeat it on her own. After the final battle, she and Grime say farewells before leaving. Ten years later, Sasha has earned a psychology degree and become a peer counselor for children, though still maintains her tough and determined spirit.

While only implied and not outright stated within the show, Matt Braly has confirmed that Sasha is bisexual.

=== Captain Grime ===
Captain Grime
- First appearance: "Best Fronds" (2019, cameo) "Prison Break" (2019, official debut)
- Last appearance: "The Hardest Thing" (2022)
- Created by: Matt Braly; Jack Ferraiolo
- Voiced by: Troy Baker

In-universe information
- Species: Cane toad
- Family: Beatrix (sister); Magnus (uncle)

Captain Grimothy "Grime" is a one-eyed cane toad and former ruler of Toad Tower. Early on in the series, he captures Sasha and believes her to be a spy after showing her Anne's missing shoe. While intimidating, his army is composed of cowards who would rather do anything other than be guards for his conquered land. When two giant herons attack Toad Tower, he finds an unlikely ally in Sasha, who convinces him to be more accepting to his lackeys and be more positive and uplifting. After the Toads defeat the herons, Grime realizes the value that Sasha holds and makes her his lieutenant. Some time later, Grime leads his army to capture the frogs in Wartwood following Hop Pop's failed effort to replace Mayor Toadstool and plans to have him killed. At his suggestion, Anne and Sasha battle each other, resulting in the destruction of Toad Tower. Grime rescues Sasha, showing that he genuinely cares about her well-being, and flees with the Toads.

Since then, Grime has lost most of his army, leaving only Percy, Braddock, and Sasha, and has become a lazy, unmotivated moocher who spends his time on Sasha's phone. Newtopia has also branded him a traitor, causing him to become a wanted criminal, with General Yunnan pursuing him. However, Sasha inspires him to regain his former glory by creating a new army to take over Newtopia. He makes a plea to the other Toad captains, including his younger sister Beatrix, to lead an army uprising against King Andrias and proves his worth after he and Sasha successfully retrieve Barrel's Warhammer. They join Anne, Marcy and the Plantars in completing the third temple; while Sasha appears to finally feel accepted by her friends, Grime insists they continue with their plan. He and Sasha stay with the Sundews while in Wartwood, where he displays a playful, jovial side. Additionally, he is shown to be well learned with the harp and capable of playing beautiful melodies. Despite this, he tries to usurp King Andrias for rule over Amphibia, but discovers that he already has his own plans. Grime ultimately helps Anne escape back to Los Angeles and stays behind with Sasha.

Grime and Sasha end up fleeing to Wartwood to escape Andrias. He plans to continue running and meet up with the rest of the toads that evaded capture, but Sasha convinces him to stay and defend Wartwood, ultimately taking her lead instead. He is soon forced to train Sprig and, while initially annoyed, begins to acknowledge his skills and begins to respect him after they fight off a swarm of hybeenas, which are hyena/bee hybrids. During the final fight with Andrias, Darcy slices off Grime's left arm while he is protecting Sasha, but he survives.

Following Anne saving Amphibia, Grime and Sasha say their farewells before she returns to Earth alongside Anne and Marcy. In the epilogue, Grime works with the other races of Amphibia as an explorer and delegate of peace.

=== Marcy Wu ===
Marcy Regina Wu
- First appearance: "Best Fronds" (2019; flashback only, non-speaking cameo) "Marcy at the Gates" (2020, official debut)
- Last appearance: "The Hardest Thing" (2022)
- Created by: Matt Braly; Jack Ferraiolo
- Voiced by: Haley Tju
- Age: 13–14 (throughout the series); 23 (epilogue of "The Hardest Thing")

In-universe information
- Species: Human
- Nationality: Taiwanese-American

Marcy Regina Wu is a 13-year-old human girl who is Anne and Sasha's childhood friend. She initially found the Calamity Box in a shop on Anne's birthday and, with Anne and Sasha, was teleported to Amphibia. She serves as the brains of the trio, and is an expert but somewhat clumsy gamer. After she, Anne, and Sasha were transported to Amphibia, she found herself in Newtopia, where she immediately fell down a flight of stairs and had to be treated at the hospital. She was accepted by the inhabitants and became King Andrias' chief advisor and ranger. After spending months with them, she was reunited with Anne and was introduced to the Plantars for the first time. It becomes apparent that while she is still clumsy, she had become more adventurous and is capable of taking care of herself while also expanding her knowledge of Amphibian culture and anatomy. However, she admits that she is jealous of Anne's ability to be social with those she meets. Marcy spends most of her time trying to do research on the Calamity Box so that she, Anne and Sasha can return home. Marcy and Anne come to accept that Sasha looked down on them despite caring about them, but still miss her and want to reunite with her to set things right. Marcy ultimately stays in Newtopia while Anne and the Plantars return to Wartwood to retrieve the Calamity Box. However, Andrias approaches her with a proposition. She arrives in Wartwood to aid Anne and the Plantars with recharging the first gem on the Calamity Box. During this time, she comes to realize that she struggles to disacknowledge problems around her and willingly forfeits one of the challenges. This ends up being the test, and they successfully recharge the gem, causing Marcy to lose its power. Afterwards, she begins to live in the fwagon outside of the Plantars' house and experiences the same outcast treatment that Anne did when she first came to Wartwood, becoming more disappointed when Polly treats her poorly because she follows others. She grows close to Maddie Flour due to their interests in magic. Marcy later helps with completing the third temple where she happily reunites with Sasha. "True Colors" reveals that Marcy knew about the Calamity Box's power all along. After learning that her parents were planning to move, she feared being alone and manipulated Sasha and Anne to steal the box from the thrift store in hopes that being transported to another world would keep them together. She helps her friends fight King Andrias after he reveals his sinister motivations and attempts to make amends by getting the box to create a portal home, but Andrias stabs her through the torso.

Marcy's body is placed in a suspended animation tank and put a special outfit by the Frobots to help her recuperate so King Andrias can make further use of her. She is later rescued by Lady Olivia and General Yunan in an effort to overthrow King Andrias. However, she is captured again and used as a vessel for the Core when it uploads itself into a multi-eyed helmet that is placed on her, although Andrias tried to convince it to reconsider its choice for a host. In this new form, she is referred to as Darcy (Dark Marcy). Marcy's personality is kept in a prison designed to feed into her desires, which is to live in a fantasy world and stay forever with Sasha and Anne. However, she comes to realize this is fake and shatters the illusion. Sasha manages to free her and Marcy makes peace with the idea of moving now knowing her bond with her friends is stronger than that.

Marcy is eventually imbued with the power of the green gem to help defeat the Core, but ultimately gives it to Anne so that she can defeat it on her own. Afterward, she says farewell to Olivia, Yunan and a repentant Andrias before returning to Earth. Ten years later, she has become a webcomic author, though is still clumsy and uncoordinated.

=== King Andrias Leviathan ===
King Andrias Leviathan
- First appearance: "Marcy at the Gates" (2020, cameo) "The Plantars Check In" (2020, official debut)
- Last appearance: "The Hardest Thing" (2022)
- Created by: Matt Braly; Adam Colás
- Voiced by: Keith David; Zeno Robinson (young)
- Inspiration: King Vendrick from Dark Souls II

In-universe information
- Species: Cyborg Chinese giant salamander
- Family: Unnamed ancestors (deceased); King Aldrich (father; deceased)

King Andrias Leviathan is a towering Chinese giant salamander named after a genus of amphibians who is the king of Amphibia. While appearing to be a jovial and kindly ruler, he seems to be plotting something involving Anne, Sasha, and Marcy. He loves riddles, as he has a habit of having Marcy go through a series of puzzles just to give her a simple message. Upon first meeting, he is boisterous and happy-go-lucky, something that upsets his advisor Lady Olivia. He takes to many human customs and culture, such as a fist bump, and was glad to see Anne for the first time after Marcy told him about her, proceeding to give the Plantars his royal credit card. He continues to study the Calamity Box with Marcy for most of Anne and the Plantars' stay. After they leave Newtopia to retrieve the Calamity Box, he enigmatically approaches Marcy with a proposition. It is later revealed that Anne, Marcy and the Plantars' mission involves undoing a prophecy so that Andrias and his mysterious master, a giant multi-eyed monster, can enact revenge. He briefs his master of their progress after cutting off Yunan informing him about the civil unrests, the meeting of the toad lords, and Grime still being at large. "True Colors" reveals that he is evil and power-hungry. Many years ago, Newtopia was a thriving city, but lost its glory following the Calamity Box's disappearance. He wanted the box back not for knowledge, but for conquering other worlds. He battles Anne and her friends before witnessing her using the powers of the blue gem to fight back. As Anne and the Plantars escape through a portal back to Los Angeles, Andrias stabs Marcy through the torso, saying "Now look what you made me do!"

In season three, King Andrias keeps Marcy alive in a suspension tank and now plots to kill Anne, as she is the only one capable of derailing his plans. He starts by sending one of his Frobots called Cloak-Bot to kill her and obtain the latest copy of a novel series that Marcy got him hooked on. After being displeased that it has not killed Anne yet and that it only got Book 3 of the novel series when Book 2 was sold out, he activates the Cloak-Bot's timer, giving it the rest of the day to kill Anne before its self-destruct sequence is initiated. Back in Newtopia, Andrias reveals his multi-eyed master known as the Core, whom he communicates with via his crown. After Olivia and Yunan free Marcy, Andrias intercepts them and reveals he and the Core were watching them. He had used the DNA of the Moss Men due to their healing properties and the studies on the Shadowfish enabled the ancients to cheat death and be preserved in the Core. Under its command, Andrias uses Marcy as a vessel for the Core, despite genuinely caring for her and showing remorse for his actions, as he had asked the Core to reconsider its choice for a host. In "Froggy Little Christmas", he expands his army and sends a remote-controlled drone to make up for the Cloak-Bot's failure. After its destruction, Darcy calls him "pathetic" and assures that his army will invade Earth to destroy his enemies once and for all. "The Core & The King", reveals that he had two friends named Barrel, a toad, and Leif, a frog whom he is implied to have been in love with. When Leif warned him about a possible apocalyptic future involving the Calamity Box, Andrias' father, Aldrich, convinced him she is a traitor and she escapes, convincing him that he was betrayed and damaging his friendship with Barrel. Andrias and Darcy soon launch their invasion of Earth. Seeing the frobots defeated, Andrias fights Anne in a Dyplosaurus suit, during which Sprig shows him a letter written by Leif. The truth of her feelings for him weakens his resolve to fight and convinces him to allow Anne to defeat him by destroying the suit, revealing that he had partially turned himself into a cyborg to prolong his life. His body is then brought back to Amphibia.

Andrias ultimately overcomes his father's influence by crushing his crown in front of Captain Grime and helps Anne, Sasha and Marcy defeat the Core by sending his Frogbots to aid them. He says farewell to Marcy before she returns to Earth, having become repentant for his actions. In the epilogue, his eyesight and body have begun to deteriorate as he had chosen not to continue maintaining his cyborg body. Andrias has taken up gardening with help from a gardening Frobot.

=== The Core ===
The Core
- First appearance: "The First Temple" (2021)
- Last appearance: "The Hardest Thing" (2022)
- Created by: Adam Colás; Todd McClintock
- Voiced by: Haley Tju (as Darcy); William Houston (King Aldrich's voice)

In-universe information
- Alias: Darcy
- Species: Artificial intelligence

The Core is an evil mechanical multi-eyed entity that King Andrias serves and is the primary antagonist of the series. It is an artificial intelligence composed of the collective preserved memories of Amphibia's greatest minds such as past scholars and rulers of Amphibia, including King Andrias's father King Aldrich. After Marcy is revived, Andrias chooses her as the Core's host after failing to get it to reconsider its choice for a host.

In this new form, they are referred to as Darcy (short for Dark Marcy). It appears again in "Froggy Little Christmas", mocking Andrias' efforts to destroy Anne and calling him "pathetic", but assuring that his army will invade Earth and destroy his enemies once and for all. The Core begins to mimic some of Marcy's personality quirks and interests. Additionally, it is revealed to be a complex computer containing the memories of Andrias' ancestors, including Aldrich, as it can speak in his voice. It is later revealed that, despite its extensive knowledge, such as anticipating the strategy from the film "War of the Warlocks", Darcy still does not know much about the Calamity Box; a fact that Anne uses to spare her life. By the end of "The Beginning of the End", Darcy launches its invasion of Earth. Darcy goes face to face with Sasha and Grime, slicing Grime's left arm off and making a large cut in Sasha's back. Despite her taunts, Sasha defeats Darcy by slicing their neural link, freeing Marcy. However, the helmet sprouts legs and flees. Once returning to Amphibia, it attaches itself to the moon (the newts having experimented on it in the past) and attempts to crash into the planet rather than accept defeat. The Core is eventually destroyed by Anne after she absorbs the power of all three gems, ending its reign forever.

== Supporting ==
=== Wartwood Swamp inhabitants ===
The following characters are the inhabitants of Wartwood Swamp:

- Bessie (vocal effects provided by Dee Bradley Baker) – A giant purple snail who serves as the Plantar family's mode of transportation. During "Anne Theft Auto", it is revealed that Hop Pop won Bessie in a bid to determine who gets to keep her, and Anne learns to drive her. She is very loving and has an affinity for mushrooms. By season 2, Bessie pulls the Fwagon that the Plantars ride in during their trip to Newtopia. Upon her return, she begins to act as a mother figure to MicroAngelo. She aids the team in "The Root Of Evil". Despite being a separate species, she is shown to have mated with Joe Sparrow and produced snail-shelled offspring by the show's epilogue.
  - MicroAngelo (vocal effects provided by Dee Bradley Baker) – A small pink snail that Polly adopts in Newtopia, who becomes close to Bessie. In the epilogue, MicroAngelo can help the Planters with gardening.
- Mayor Frodrick Toadstool (voiced by Stephen Root) – A toad who is the corrupt, greedy, and arrogant mayor of Wartwood Swamp. He tends to raise taxes and use Anne as an opportunity to further his image. Despite his flaws, he is capable of doing nice things and even do the unexpected for the greater good, though he has admitted that he is only willing to help his citizens so he can swindle them. However, following these events, he grows softer on the people of Wartwood and becomes a more responsible mayor, though he still displays some corrupt tendencies. In the epilogue, nine months after the Core is defeated, he has retired from his mayoral duties and now assists the new mayor Toadie.
  - Toadie (voiced by Jack McBrayer) – A small frog who is Mayor Toadstool's loyal personal assistant. He has started learning to be more independent from him, even learning fighting skills. In the epilogue, nine months after the Core is defeated, Toadie has become the Mayor of Wartwood where he was supported by Toadstool.
- Buck Leatherleaf (voiced by James Adomian) – The sheriff of Wartwood.
- Walliam "One-Eyed Wally" Ribbiton (voiced by James Patrick Stuart) – A local town vagrant with one working eye and half a shoe on one foot who plays a caterpillar-shaped accordion. Anne initially viewed him with disdain, but has since accepted his eccentricities. He comes from a rich family that resides in Ribbitvale, but wants to live the life of a vagrant, which his father had to accept. Only Anne and the Plantars are aware of his double life. He is also shown to be a natural at Muay Thai.
- Sadie Croaker (voiced by Laila Berzins) – An old lady with a cataract in her left eye. She runs Croaker Dairy where she sells dairy products. Sadie has a certain amount of respect for Hop Pop, yet does not like Sprig despite trying to. She was also a former secret agent. In the epilogue, nine months after the Core's is defeated, Sadie purchases one of Maddie's potions.
  - Archie (vocal effects provided by Dee Bradley Baker) – Sadie's pet spider who acts like a dog.
- Felicia Sundew (voiced by Kaitlyn Robrock) – Ivy's mother, Sylvia's daughter, the proprietor of "Felicia's Tea Shoppe", and a member of the Sundew family. She was entranced with her daughter loving Sprig yet got annoyed at the Plantars, but soon came to respect them. She has a deep love for her restaurant and her daughter, and it is revealed that she was once an adventurer and hopes to one day take Ivy with her on one. Because of this, she is well versed in Muay Thai.
- Sylvia Sundew (voiced by Mona Marshall) – Felicia Sundew's mother, Ivy's grandmother, Hopediah's love interest, and a member of the Sundew Family. She has always harbored feelings for Hop Pop because she "has a thing for the weird ones". She is considered an honorary Plantar. In the epilogue, nine months after the Core's is defeated, it is implied that Sylvia settled down with Hop Pop as she is seen relaxing alongside him.
- Ivy Sundew (voiced by Katie Crown) – Felicia Sundew's daughter, Sylvia's granddaughter, Sprig's childhood friend, and a member of the Sundew Family. She was forced into a courtship with him, but decided to remain friends. She eventually reciprocates his feelings and they become a couple. Upon Sprig's return to Wartwood Swamp, she begins openly dating him. She has bushy hair under her beanie. Ivy learns that her mother has been secretly training her to defend herself for when she can take her on an adventure. When Sprig and his family return to Wartwood, they resume their relationship, much to the annoyance of everyone. However, they decide to dial it back after nearly ruining a mission. In the epilogue, nine months after Andrias is defeated, Ivy has taken up adventuring and leaves with Sprig to explore a newly discovered continent.
- Leopold Loggle (voiced by Brian Maillard) – An axolotl who is the town's wood-smith and is proprietor of his woodcraft store. He used to be a metalsmith until an incident where he accidentally impaled his voice box, causing him to have speaking issues. He says introducing adverbs and pauses before saying a negative ending word, a trait that some find annoying. Following Anne and the Plantars' return to Wartwood, Loggle is revealed to have become enormously buff. In the epilogue, nine months after the Core's is defeated, Loggle's body has turned back to normal as he comments that he shouldn't have taken that cheat day.
- Albus Duckweed (voiced by Kevin McDonald) – A newt who is the local food critic. He also acts as a master of ceremonies at different events.
- Stumpy (voiced by John DiMaggio) – The cook and proprietor of "Stumpy's Diner", who has interchangeable prosthetic hands. He was ready to resign his dilapidated restaurant, but regains his gumption after Anne turns it into a Thai-Frog fusion restaurant.
- Mr. Flour (voiced by Kevin Michael Richardson) – The baker, proprietor of "Flour & Daughters Bakery", and the father of Maddie, Rosemary, Ginger, and Lavender Flour. He seemed keen on having Sprig become betrothed to his daughter Maddie.
- Maddie Flour (voiced by Jill Bartlett) – Mr. Flour's daughter and Rosemary, Ginger, and Lavender Flour's older sister. She is an expert of magic and Sprig's ex-fiancée, who works at "Flour & Daughters Bakery." She was initially betrothed to Sprig so Anne could get flour dough, which she seemed happy about. After Sprig broke up with her, she was disappointed, but remained friends with him. Despite seeming creepy, she is kind and understanding. She used to play with her younger siblings on a regular basis, but became absorbed by her hobby in magic. She ultimately learns to make time for them. In the epilogue, nine months after the Core is defeated, Maddie has opened up her own apothecary and sells one of her potions to Sadie.
- Rosemary, Ginger, and Lavender Flour (voiced by Eden Riegel in "Civil Wart", Marlow Barkley, Ella Allan, and Mia Allan in Season 2) – Maddie's younger tadpole siblings and Mr. Flour's younger daughters. They love their older sister and want nothing more than to spend time with her. In the epilogue, nine months following the defeat of the Core, they have grown their legs but are still tadpoles and help Maddie run her apothecary.
- Soggy Joe (voiced by Fred Tatasciore) – A frog survivalist who has a nose for succulent smells. He also works as a truck driver and seems understanding of Polly. Soggy Joe is later seen with the resistance when Anne reunites with Domino II, which he identifies as a Coastal Kill-a-Moth. Soggy Joe is also the star of the "Wild Amphibia" shorts.
- Fern (voiced by Natalie Palamides) – A resident in Wartwood who works as a barber and hairdresser at Hair Are Frogs. Despite her job, Fern is relaxed to the point of being inattentive and aloof. She is the only person in Wartwood who did not know that Sprig and Ivy were in a relationship, as seen when they and Stumpy are paired up with her in one of Sasha's missions.
- Tuti (voiced by April Winchell) – The town masseuse and a part-time bounty hunter.
- Tad (voiced by Sam Riegel) – A glass artisan. When the acting troupe that was supposed to perform in Wartwood Swamp had to cancel due to them getting eaten, Anne enlists Tad to make a large glass screen which she combined with her phone to show the citizens of Wartwood Swamp a movie.
- Chuck (voiced by Matt Braly) – A tulip farmer who wears a hat that covers his eyes. He mostly says "I grow tulips". Chuck is also fast at building things and watches over the Plantar family's house while they are away in Newtopia.
- Monroe (voiced by Paul Eiding) – Hopediah's rival for Sylvia Sundew's affection.
- Quentin (voiced by Scott Menville) – A cashier at Grub & Go.
- Gunther (voiced by Chris Sullivan) – A southern tusked frog who is calm and kind, but becomes large and monstrous when angered. He lives outside of Wartwood Swamp.
- Barry (voiced by Keith Silverstein) – A jovial candy berry maker who holds grudges against anyone who spills his candy berries and also makes spells and curses, which earned him the wrath of Maddie who briefly turned him into a bird. Barry later takes part in the anarchy by leading a group of Marauders. With Toadie's help, the Marauders are defeated with Maddie turning Barry into a chicken as some of the Marauders chase after him.
- Frobo (voiced by Matt Braly) – An enigmatic Frobot (short for frog-robot) that rested in the Ruins of Despair. After Anne and the Plantars left, it suddenly came to and began following them. He later arrives in Wartwood Swamp, where he is adopted by Polly before the rest of the Plantars after a misunderstanding from the locals. He is capable of many things, including gardening and making toast. During the battle against Andrias and his army of robots, Frobo is destroyed, leaving only his head. Anne and the Plantars manage to bring Frobo's head with them when they escape to Los Angeles. He is partially rebuilt, but gets reduced to a talking head. He returns to Amphibia with Anne and the Plantars, and has his head placed on top of an RC car. Frobo eventually receives a new body by Polly and now resembles a fighting robot. During the epilogue, Frobo continues to help the Plantars with gardening.
- Zechariah Nettles – A scary-looking frog who wears a stovepipe hat and possesses a creepy smile, a hook hand and a lantern. Despite his frightening appearance and harsh actions, he is actually a spirit that helps guide travelers on the right path home. His spirit may live in Wartwood Swamp, as is last seen in the group photo at the end of "Battle of the Bands".

=== Toad Tower inhabitants ===
The following characters are inhabitants of Toad Tower:

- Bog (voiced by Darin De Paul) – A ruthless toad soldier and tax collector who wields a giant hammer. He and the rest of the toad army abandoned Grime following Toad Tower's destruction. Bog and the remnants of Grime's army began operating as bandits. He later becomes the new head of Toad Tower after Toadstool saves Wartwood from him and the army. Bog is later seen during the battle against Andrias' forces. In the epilogue, Bog is mentioned to have started a junk-collecting business.
- Fens (voiced by April Winchell) – An aggressive female toad soldier who wields a kanabō. She left Grime's army following Toad Tower's destruction. She later joined the remnants of Grime's army when they were operating as bandits until Bog is named the new head of Toad Tower. Fens is later seen during the battle against Andrias' forces. In the epilogue, Fens is mentioned to be part of Bog's junk-collecting business.
- Mire – A toad soldier in full body armor who does not speak and mostly growls. He left Grime's army following Toad Tower's destruction. He later joined the remnants of Grime's army when they were operating as bandits until Bog is named the new head of Toad Tower. Mire is later seen during the battle against Andrias' forces. In the epilogue, Mire is mentioned to be part of Bog's junk-collecting business.
- Percy (voiced by Matt Jones) – A friendly toad soldier who dreams of being a jester. In season 2, he and Braddock are the only toad soldiers left in Grime's army, as they did not abandon him. He, along with Braddock, do leave when Sasha's actions negatively affect them. Sasha later instructs Grime to find Percy and Braddock so he can tell them her apology and goodbye.
- Braddock (voiced by Kristen Johnston in Season 1, April Winchell in Season 2) – A friendly female toad soldier who likes to garden and socialize. She and Percy are the only toad soldiers left in Grime's army after the rest deserted him following Toad Tower's destruction. She, along with Percy, eventually leave when Sasha's actions negatively affect them. Sasha later instructs Grime to find Percy and Braddock so that he can tell them her apology and goodbye.
- Captain Beatrix "Bea" (voiced by Aisling Bea) – A cane toad who is the Captain of the West Toad Tower and Grime's older sister After King Andrias' true motives are revealed, Beatrix sends a letter to Grime to inform him that she and the toads with her evaded capture. She later offers her services to help the resistance if Sprig can beat her. If he wins, her army will join their army, and if she wins, they all join her army as cannon fodder. Sprig manages to defeat Beatrix in a cage match, allowing her to uphold her agreement in joining the resistance. She later leads the toads in the final rebellion against Andrias.
- Captain Bufo (voiced by Daisuke Tsuji) – Captain of the East Toad Tower.
- Captain Aldo (voiced by Ron Cephas Jones) – Captain of the North Toad Tower, who looks old and decrepit. He is covered in plants, has eyes deeply sunken into his head, and rarely speaks.

=== Newtopia inhabitants ===
The following characters are inhabitants of Newtopia:

- Joe Sparrow – A giant sparrow that serves as Marcy's steed and mode of transportation. He likes to flirt with Bessie. In the episode "Turning Point" Joe helps Sasha and Grime escape and head to Wartwood to teach the frogs to fight. As of "All In". Sasha and her team ride on him to the castle. During the epilogue, Joe and Bessie have produced hybrid children together. His name is a reference to concept artist Joe Sparrow.
- Lady Olivia (voiced by Michelle Dockery) – An aquamarine newt and Andrias' royal adviser. She is shown to be very uptight and proper, getting easily annoyed at the reckless behaviors of the Plantars. Olivia later learns of the king's true intentions to conquer other dimensions. "Olivia & Yunan" reveals that she inherited her position from her mother, whom she deeply respects while also having helped to heal Marcy upon her arrival. After Amphibia begins to mined for resources, Olivia seeks to free Newtopia from King Andrias. Her fear was exploited during the mission that had Olivia being bereted by her mother for her failure. She and Yunan team up to rescue Marcy, but fail after Andrias intercepts them. Lady Olivia and General Yunan are outfitted with mind-control collars by the time Anne, Sasha, Grime, Frobo and the Plantars storm King Andrias' castle, but Anne and Sasha free them as they unsuccessfully try to warn them about the Core. However, they are later captured by the Core and taken prisoner. After escaping, Olivia aids Sasha and Grime in freeing Marcy, and she is given the laser blaster. She and Yunan fight some Cloak-Bots. In the epilogue, nine months after the defeat of the Core, Olivia discusses settling down in Wartwood with Yunan, whom she is now in a relationship with.
- General Yunan Longclaw (voiced by Zehra Fazal) – A Yunnan lake newt with retractable claws in her gauntlets who describes herself as Newtopia's "Scourge of the Sand Wars, Defeater of Ragnar the Wretched, and the youngest newt to ever achieve the rank of general in the great Newtopian Army". She is ruthless and bloodthirsty, as she disposed of her own army because she felt they held her back. She has a habit of introducing herself in a flashy manner, but gets annoyed when people do not recognize her. Yunan tried hunting down Captain Grime, only for her to get outwitted by him and Sasha. She is loyal to King Andrias, but appears unaware of his true motives until he begins his plans to conquer other dimensions. Yunan later teams up with Olivia to rescue Marcy, but ends up failing after Andrias intercepts them. The episode also reveals that she has a fear of grubhogs due to an incident in her childhood, as a grubhog nearly ate her arm. She and Lady Olivia are outfitted with mind-control collars by the time Anne, Sasha, Grime, Frobo and the Plantars storm King Andrias' castle, but Anne and Sasha free them as they unsuccessfully try to warn them about the Core. However, they are later captured by the Core and taken prisoner. After escaping, Yunan aids Sasha and Grime in freeing Marcy, and she and Olivia fight some Cloak-Bots. In the epilogue, nine months after the defeat of the Core, Yunan has retired and is now in a relationship with Olivia. Fazal drew inspiration from characters such as Pokémon's Team Rocket and Darkwing Duck for her performance.
- Barley, Blair, and Branson (voiced by Sam Riegel) – King Andrias' trio of technicians, whom he playfully refers to as "Triple B". The three are socially inept and sometimes used as guinea pigs by King Andrias.
- Efty (voiced by Brielle Milla) – A young axolotl girl with a pet kill-a-pillar named Goblin that Anne helps.
- Doris (voiced by Tress MacNeille) – An elderly newt who knits and loves puzzles and befriends Anne.
- Gertie (voiced by Nicole Byer) – An axolotl who runs a "Gnatchos" stand who offers good advice to Anne.
- Bella (voiced by Kristen Schaal) – An overworked bellhop newt who runs afoul of Sprig, but ends up befriending him. She later appears as part of the Resistance's battle against Andrias' forces.
- Jerry (voiced by Jack Ferraiolo in "Lost in Newtopia", Fred Tatasciore in "Newts in Tights") – An axolotl who works as a spicy food vendor.
- Professor Herringbone (voiced by Flula Borg) – The headmaster at Newtopia University, who sees potential in Sprig.
- Professor Scalini (voiced by Kari Wahlgren) – A teacher at Newtopia University.
- Sal (voiced by Maurice LaMarche) – An old friend of Hopediah's and former Wartwood Swamp citizen who created a special sauce and became a huge success in Newtopia after leaving Wartwood.
- Priscilla "The Killa" Paddock (voiced by Misty Lee) – A large toughened newt who rivals Anne for a special teapot. It is revealed to have sentimental value to her, as it was made by her mother Penny before she passed, and is allowed it after Anne wins it.
  - Pearl Paddock (voiced by Romi Dames) – Priscilla's daughter, who is happy and supportive of her mother.
- Jacinda (voiced by Salli Saffioti) – An emissary of Newtopia who offers the position of Toad Tower to Mayor Toadstool. She instead decides to offer the position to Bog due to his ruthlessness, while Toadstool is deemed "soft" and becomes Bog's new assistant.
- Bernardo (voiced by Thomas Middleditch) – A fashion designer from Newtopia who is an expert in body armor.
- Frobots – Frog-like robots that work for King Andrias and the Core. Each one of them comes in their own class. Frobo was an ancient Frobot who sided with Anne and the Plantars.
  - Cloak-Bot (voiced by Troy Baker) – A sinister stealthy Frobot who works under King Andrias and is determined to kill Anne while obtaining the latest issue of a novel series that Marcy got King Andrias hooked on. It pursued Anne and her family to a grocery store where Anne used her powered-up abilities to damage it. It is able to repair itself until finally being destroyed after self-destructing. Its right arm was later salvaged by Robert Otto. More Cloak-Bots later appear defending the forcefield generator and fighting against Yunan and Olivia who defeated them.
  - Giant Frobot (voiced by Troy Baker) – A gigantic golden Frobot that was dispatched to Wartwood. It is simultaneously destroyed by Sasha. Silver versions of it are seen fighting the Resistance.
    - Dwarf Frobots – Tadpole-themed Frobots produced by the Giant Frobot, but are defeated by the Wartwood citizens.
  - Fire Frobots – A type of Frobot with flamethrowers, who tracks Anne, the Plantars, and Loggle to Gardenton but are defeated by Apothecary Gary and the Gardenton inhabitants.
  - Judge Frobot (voiced by Fred Tatasciore) – A judge-themed Frobot used to dispense justice on Tritonio's group. It wields a gavel in battle. It is ultimately destroyed through the efforts of Anne, Sprig, Tritonio, and his group.
    - Hooded Frobots (voiced by Fred Tatasciore) – The servants of Judge Frobot.
  - Royal Guard Frobots (voiced by Matt Braly) – Purple Frobots that wield lances and extendable shields who fight the resistance but are defeated by them
  - Butler Frobots (voiced by Matt Chapman) – Butler-themed Frobots that serve drinks to King Andrias.
- Dragonfly Drones – A group of dragonfly-type drones first used by Cloak-Bot. A Dragonfly Drone was used to track Anne, the Plantars, and Loggle to Gardenton and alert the Fire Frobots.
- King Aldrich (voiced by William Houston) – Andrias' father and the previous king of Amphibia. He is ruthless and determined to continue the invasion of Earth. His consciousness is later revealed to be held within the Core.
- Barrel (voiced by Jason Ritter) – A tough, yet friendly toad who wields a powerful hammer. He was once friends with Andrias, but following a bitter falling out, was relegated to guarding the frog villages on the outskirts of Amphibia. He is killed by the Narwhal Worm. His hammer was later sought out by Grime, then Andrias used as a cane in the epilogue.
- Leif (voiced by Cassandra Lee Morris) – A young and nimble frog who was once close friends with Andrias and an ancestor of the Plantars. She had a vision of Amphibia's destruction, but was labeled a traitor, forcing her to steal the music box and flee Newtopia, ruining her relationship with Andrias. It is revealed via a letter she wrote that she fled to Wartwood and changed her name to Lily Plantar, marrying a native farmer and starting the Plantar family. However, she never forgot Andrias and hoped that he would not stay angry at her. Her letter eventually reaches him, thanks to Sprig.

=== Road to Newtopia ===
The following characters appear during the Plantar's journey to Newtopia:

- Bitties (voiced by Eden Riegel and Sam Riegel) – A race of small frogs that live in Bittyburg.
  - Bailey (voiced by Julian Edwards) – A young Bitty that lives in Bittyburg with his father and sister.
  - Bailey's Father (voiced by Keith Ferguson) – The unnamed father of Bailey.
- Hasselback Family – A group of outlaws who terrorized the Bitties of Bittyburg.
  - Mama Hasselback (voiced by Jenifer Lewis) – The giant elderly toad who is the matriarch of the Hasselback Family.
  - Judro Hasselback (voiced by Keith Ferguson) – Mama's son and second-in-command, who wears an eyepatch.
  - Heathro Hasselback (voiced by Keith Ferguson) – Mama's other son and Judro's brother.
  - Ruth Hasselback (voiced by Eden Riegel) – Mama's newt daughter and Judro and Heathro's half-sister.
  - Talbert Hasselback (voiced by Keith Ferguson) – Mama's frog brother with a big mustache who is Judro, Heathro, and Ruth's uncle.
- Renee Frodgers (voiced by Susan Egan) – A famous stage Actor, playwright and director and Hop Pop's idol. She has since used her acting and traveling theater as a cover to rob towns blind. Renee was thwarted in her latest heist by Hop Pop and arrested by the local sheriff.
  - Francis / François (voiced by Max Mittelman) – A child method actor who is part of Renee's troupe.
- Wigbert Ribbiton (voiced by Hugh Bonneville) – Wally's wealthy father, who resides in Ribbitvale and wears a monocle. He despised his son's nomad lifestyle, but learned to accept him for while revealing that he plays the jug. He is later seen giving the Wartwood Resistance supplies in their fight against King Andrias, as some of the Wartwood citizens notice that he is similar to Wally.
- Crumpet the Frog (voiced by Matt Vogel) – The announcer for Beast Polo. He is physically based on Kermit the Frog, whom his voice actor also performs.
- The Curator / Mr. Ponds (voiced by Alex Hirsch) – The sinister eyepatch-wearing owner of the Curiosity Hut wax museum, who attempted to turn Anne into one of his exhibits. After his prisoners are freed from their wax prison, they drag him into another room and kill him, despite claiming that the red liquid that went under the door was red wax. He is a frog version of Grunkle Stan from Gravity Falls, which Braly worked on as a storyboard artist and director.
  - Frog Soos (voiced by Alex Hirsch) – The Curator's assistant. He is a frog version of Soos from Gravity Falls.
  - Frog Shmebulock (voiced by Alex Hirsch) – One of the Curator's prisoners. He is a frog version of Shmebulock from Gravity Falls.

=== Proteus inhabitants ===
The following characters are the olm residents of the underground city of Proteus:

- Lysil and Angwin (voiced by Laila Berzins and Chris Wylde) – Twin-sided olms who constantly bicker with one another on how to devour their prey. Sprig and Polly outwit and escape them when they try to eat them. Months later, Anne, Sasha, and the Plantars return to get information from them where they admit that they are banished from their home city of Proteus. Despite this, they put their life on the line to rescue it and are allowed back in as a result.
- Parisia (voiced by Rachel House) – The leader of the olms in the city of Proteus who is stubbornly in denial about King Andrias' forces closing in on them and refuses to help or be offered help from others. After Sasha insults her, she finds her determination amusing and allows her to see the Mother of Olms.
- Mother Olm (voiced by Whoopi Goldberg) – The wisest of all the olms who is so large that the inside of her head is like a building, complete with a door where her eardrum is. There was flapping in her head because of a swarm of batsquitos (a race of bat/mosquito hybrids) where her brain is until they were expelled. She knows about the prophecy and aids Anne, Sasha, and the Plantars with their quest in deciphering the prophecy, which she wrote down on the ceiling when the special brain cream that was applied to her had expired 70 years ago. She states that whatever powers Anne, Sasha, and Marcy got from the music box must be reclaimed from the clutches of King Andrias. She later appears at the resistance headquarters to warn them of King Andrias's impending invasion of Earth. She later informs the group about the prophecy as the Core takes control of the Moon. She also gives Anne information about a spell of last resort involving the stones that would cost its user their life. Mother Olm later mourns Anne's death until the Guardian of the Stones resurrects her, and she is last seen happy to see Anne alive.

=== Los Angeles inhabitants ===
The following are inhabitants of Los Angeles on Earth:

- Mrs. Boonchuy (voiced by On Braly) – Anne's mother and co-proprietor of Thai Go, who appears to be strict, but is very caring towards her daughter. She is bilingual and loves singing old Thai songs despite being "tone deaf". She had trouble accepting the Plantars, especially Sprig, whom she called "Pink Frog", but warmed up to them. It is revealed that during Anne's disappearance, Mrs. Boonchuy was consoled by her neighbors, and would also build several shrines and effigies of her daughter, showing that she is also an artist. She learns the real reason for Anne's return and, while angry at first, agrees to help her and her friends after realizing she was watching out for her, her husband, and the Plantars. She and her husband accept that Anne has matured significantly and watch her return to Amphibia to save her friends, before confronting Mr. X with the truth. She and her husband later become trained agents in the fight against Andrias. She is voiced by On Braly, Braly's mother.
- Mr. Boonchuy (voiced by Brian Sounalath) – Anne's father and co-proprietor of Thai Go, who shares the same protective qualities as Hop Pop. He respects the Plantars for taking good care of Anne during the five months she was missing. Additionally, he is an online gamer. He eventually learns the real reason for Anne's return, but agrees to help her and her friends as he understands that she was looking out for him, his wife and the Plantars. He and his wife accept that Anne has matured significantly and watch her return to Amphibia to save her friends, before confronting Mr. X with the truth. He and his wife later become trained agents in the fight against Andrias.
- Domino – The Boonchuys' playful and shawarma-loving Cat, who is named after her black and white pattern.
- Maggie (voiced by Eden Riegel) – A girl at Saint James Middle School who would pick on Anne until she was repelled by Sasha. She would later witness Anne's fight with King Andrias and no longer plans to give her trouble.
- Vince (voiced by Sam Riegel) – A student at Saint James Middle School. He plays the guitar, which Sasha complemented on his riffing.
- Cheyenne – A student at Saint James Middle School. She would later witness Anne's fight with King Andrias.
- Gabby (voiced by Jessica McKenna) – Anne's hyper and talkative friend who is always droning on about gossip. She would later witness Anne's fight with King Andrias.
- Ned (voiced by Wayne Knight) – The Boonchuys' biggest customer at Thai Go, who dreamed of expanding their business through a food truck. After realizing that it would have been a "gross appropriation" and an incident where Sprig caused his food truck to go out of control, he gives up on this and instead becomes their delivery boy.
- Dr. Jan (voiced by Anika Noni Rose) – The curator of the Natural History Museum, who is quirky and obsessed with extraterrestrials and cryptids. She immediately takes to the Plantars' appearance and aids Anne in discovering a potential way home for them. Dr. Jan later warns Anne about meeting strange scientists who would offer to help her out. Dr. Jan assists the Boonchuy family, the Plantars, and the IT Gals in making a Christmas float, and later aids the group in getting Anne and the Plantars back to Amphibia. Dr. Jan later helped in the fight against King Andrias' forces.
- The IT Gals (voiced by Melissa Villaseñor and Dana Davis) – Ally and Jess are a technology-loving couple who build and create things online. They aid Polly with rebuilding Frobo and are impressed with her and the robot's statistics. They later assist the Boonchuy family, the Plantars, and Dr. Jan in making a Christmas float, and later help Anne and the Plantars escape back to Amphibia. Ally and Jess later witness the fight between Anne and King Andrias.
- Mr. X (voiced by RuPaul Charles) – An effeminate and enigmatic FBI agent who believes that the Plantars are aliens and plots to capture and study them, seeing it as a challenge. Mr. and Mrs. Boonchuy were able to help Anne and the Plantars outwit him in the movie theater, though he vows to catch the Plantars someday. Mr. X later pursues Hop Pop when he tries to become an actor, but is thwarted by Anne and the Plantars. He finally manages to capture the Plantars, but is thwarted by Anne and her allies. After Anne and the Plantars escape to Amphibia, the Boonchuys angrily confront Mr. X as Mrs. Boonchuy plans to have him hear them out. In "All In", he learns the truth and aids the Boonchuys and Plantars in defeating Andrias and Darcy.
  - Jenny – Mr. X's silent, but loyal assistant who drives a van.
- Robert Otto (voiced by Brad Garrett) – The owner of the junkyard "Otto's Auto Junk" and self-proclaimed "neighorbood safety supervisor", who fancied himself as a protector of his neighborhood. When Sprig became a superhero named Frog-Man, Robert grew jealous and used Cloak-Bot's right arm to fight him. He is later shamed by his granddaughter for being reckless and gives up villainy while helping Sprig to clean up the mess they made during their fight. After Sprig leaves, a police officer prepares to arrest Robert for his part in the property damage as he just quotes "Fair enough". While donning Cloak-Bot's right arm and a pair of goggles, he is a reference to Doctor Octopus.
- Molly Jo (voiced by Cassie Glow) – Robert's granddaughter who likes Sprig's superhero persona as Frog-Man. After Robert and Sprig end up destroying the city, she angrily scolds them for being reckless, but forgives them after they clean up the mess they made. She is a reference to Mary Jane Watson. Molly Jo later helps Anne and the Plantars return to Amphibia, and witnesses the fight between Anne and King Andrias.
- Humphrey Westwood (voiced by Wallace Shawn) – An elderly janitor and aspiring actor in Hollywood who resembles Hop Pop. He is very kind and willing to give up his chances to help others, but Hop Pop ultimately decides to give up his dreams so that Humphrey can achieve his. Humphrey later helps Anne and the Plantars return to Amphibia. Humphrey later witness Anne's fight with King Andrias.
- Dr. Frakes (voiced by Cree Summer) – A deranged scientist who managed to create a machine that opens portals to other dimensions, but only for five seconds. Upon learning that the Plantars are frogs and being unable to find Amphibia in her machine, she tries to dissect them to achieve fame, but is defeated by Anne and Terri.
- Terri (voiced by Kate Micucci) – Dr. Frakes' former assistant, who unlike her is down to earth and respectful. They help Anne rescue the Plantars from their boss at the cost of their job. Terri uses their own resources to build a new portal for the Plantars, and afterwards teams up with Anne and their allies to rescue the Plantars from Mr. X and send them home. Terri later helps in the fight against King Andrias' forces. Terri comes out as non-binary in the book Marcy's Journal: A Guide to Amphibia, as they are revealed to have switched to "they/them" pronouns.
- Street Performer (voiced by Rebecca Sugar) – A musician who performs an original Christmas song in Los Angeles. She is revealed in the book Marcy's Journal: A Guide to Amphibia to be named Becka Salt, a parody of Rebecca Sugar's name.
- Principal Murphy (voiced by Kimberly Brooks) – The principal of Saint James Middle School. In a flashback, she had Anne write a "Who Am I" essay after calling her, Sasha, and Marcy down to her office for throwing a K-pop party. She is in her house during King Andrias' invasion and later witnesses Anne's fight with King Andrias.

=== Other characters ===
- Domino II – A Kill-a-pillar, later Coastal Kill-a-moth, that Anne adopts and names after her cat. Anne grows attached to her despite her violent tendencies and is forced to let her go after she transforms into an adult moth. She later has six "kittens" and is rescued by Anne and Sprig from the Power Plant farm. Domino II is revealed to be the Alpha Moth and officially leads the rebellion's flying artillery. Anne and Sasha later ride Domino II during the battle against King Andrias' forces. Domino 2 also assists the team in "All In", helping Anne defeat the Frobots by using her wings to blow up them. Nine months after the Core is defeated, Domino 2 flies with some of her offspring.
- Mudmen (voiced by Bill Farmer and Fred Tatasciore) – A group of cannibalistic frogs that cover themselves in mud from the mud swamps that they live on so that they can ambush, kill, and eat trespassers while passing themselves off as cryptids. One Mudman was later seen at the Bizarre Bazaar.
- Moss Man – A mysterious moss based humanoid creature that stalks the lands of Amphibia. Only Anne and One-Eyed Wally seem to have seen him, but his elusiveness have made it difficult for others to believe he exists. It is later revealed that King Andrias captured him and used his DNA to improve Newtopia's medical technology and revive Marcy. There are other Moss Men which were created by Leif the frog. A Moss Man later appears to help fight the Frobots.
- Jonah (voiced by Jeff Bergman) – An African bullfrog who is Mrs. Croaker's former arch-enemy.
- Teddy (voiced by Chris Sullivan) – A cannibalistic horned bullfrog who runs a bed and breakfast where they leave traps for the snails owned by the passersby, offer them one of the inn's rooms, and then abduct them using drugged cookies to eat them.
  - Martha (voiced by Kari Wahlgren) – Teddy's wife.
  - Juliet (voiced by Kari Wahlgren) – A cannibalistic horned bullfrog associated with Teddy and Martha.
  - Juniper (voiced by Kari Wahlgren) – A cannibalistic horned bullfrog associated with Teddy and Martha.
- Valeriana (voiced by Susanne Blakeslee) – A mysterious one-armed newt who runs an antique stand at the Bizarre Bazaar. She seems to know about the Calamity Box and Anne's destiny. She is later revealed to be the guardian of the second temple and tests Anne based on her strength of heart courage, though not before insulting her as part of the tests. Valeriana later gives Anne, Sasha, and Marcy the power to fight the Core as it plans to crash the Moon into Amphibia, and later uses the fragments of the stones to get them back to Earth.
- Marnie (voiced by Bill Kopp) – A proprietor at the Bizarre Bazaar who runs an underground game of beetle racing and tries to pawn off Anne's things.
- "Amphibia's Got Talent" Judges (voiced by Tara Lipinski and Johnny Weir) – Two famous newt judges who have a keen eye for talent. They run a show similar to the one on Anne's world.
- Tritonio Espada (voiced by Matt Chapman) – A Eastern Newt and an expert weapon combat trainer who teaches Anne, Sprig and Polly how to fight. He is actually a criminal who uses them to rob a train bound for Toad Tower. He later returns, now leading a gang of thieves that rob from King Andrias. Despite his initial reluctance due to his upbringing on the streets, Anne convinces him to stick with his team and join the rebellion after helping to rescue his gang from Judge Frobot. He leads the newts in the final rebellion against Andrias.
  - Jojo Potato (voiced by Archie Yates) – A small newt who is part of Tritonio's band of thieves and looks up to him.
  - Little Louise (voiced by Laila Berzins) – A large and strong newt who claims that her name is supposed to be ironic. Her name is a reference to Little John.
- Frog Jordan (voiced by Diedrich Bader) – A famous bugball player on Mayor Toadstool's team.
- Lydia (voiced by Eden Riegel) – A bugball player on Mayor Toadstool's team.
- Olaf – A bugball player on Mayor Toadstool's team, who is mentioned to be a transfer from out of state.
- Apothecary Gary (voiced by Tony Hale) – A large glowing fungus that took over the mind of a frog named Lloyd (also voiced by Tony Hale). He managed to escape onto Jeremy the Beetle before finding the village of Gardenton, where the residents willingly submitted to him so their crops could prosper. Apothecary Gary attempts to attack the Plantars, but Hop Pop convinces him they are similar and that he should aid them in defeating Andrias following an attack by Andrias' robots. He is later seen during the battle against King Andrias where he has some of his fellow mushrooms planted on the Frobots.
- Shadowfish – A race of floating-Ghost fish from another dimension kept in the castle's dungeons, which is off limits to everyone else. King Andrias later reveals to Olivia and Yunan during their attempt at rescuing Marcy that the ancient inhabitants of Amphibia studied the Shadowfish to cheat death, enabling Amphibia's greatest minds to come together in the Core.
- Screen Fiend – A small catlike creature who lives in an internet video and emerges to reveal itself as a giant ferocious beast.
- Mr. Littlepot (voiced by George Takei) – The personification of Death, who is responsible for Hop Pop's hair loss.
- Seamstress (voiced by Matt Braly) – A glass frog who, self-conscious of her own appearance, steals other frogs' skins to hide herself. She is a parody of Leatherface from the Texas Chainsaw Massacre.
- Horace (voiced by Fred Tatasciore) – A frog who is a resident of Gardenton.
- The Guardian (voiced by Lo Mutuc) (Note: Credited as Charlyne Yi) – The supreme guardian of the Calamity Gems, who has been watching over the universe for eons. Its true form is an indescribable ball of light, so it takes on the form of Domino, Anne's pet cat. It plans to one day pass its job over to Anne after 78 years.
