= Anne or Beast? =

- Amphibia episode
- Title card
- Episode no.: Season 1 Episode 1a
- Directed by: Bert Youn
- Written by: Matt Braly; Jack Ferraiolo
- Production code: 103A
- Original air date: June 17, 2019 (Note: This episode was released on DisneyNOW and Disney Channel's official YouTube channel on June 14, 2019.)
- Running time: 11 minutes

Episode chronology
← Previous —	Next → "Best Fronds"
- Amphibia season 1

"Anne or Beast?" is the first segment of the first episode of the first season of the American animated television series Amphibia. The episode was written by series creator Matt Braly and Jack Ferraiolo and directed by Bert Youn. In the episode, a frog named Sprig Plantar tries to capture a mysterious beast to prove that he is responsible, only to be caught by a human teenage girl named Anne Boonchuy.

The episode premiered on Disney Channel on June 17, 2019 to strong positive reviews. The episode garnered 0.39 million viewers when it premiered.

== Plot ==
External videos
- Anne or Beast? / Best Fronds S1 E1 Full Episode Amphibia Disney Channel — Official upload of the episode onto YouTube

Late at night, outside the town of Wartwood, a loony native called One-Eyed Wally leaves the pub and is "attacked" by a strange creature.

The next day, the Plantars, which consists of grandfather Hop Pop and his two grandchildren: 10-year-old Sprig and his younger sister Polly, come to town to go shopping. Hop Pop puts Polly in charge of watching the wagon over the older Sprig due to his tendency to be irresponsible. Meanwhile, an unharmed Wally runs into town raving and ranting about a creature with unusual features that supposedly was trying to eat him. As Mayor Toadstool promises that something will be done about it, Sprig decides that he will be the one to capture the creature so that he can earn Hop Pop's trust. He bribes Polly with candy, who accepts and Sprig hops away into the woods.

Sprig begins his search only to be immediately caught by the beast, revealed to be a human girl named Anne Boonchuy. She rescues Sprig from a giant praying mantis and the two begin to learn about one another. Anne explains that she found herself in Amphibia through unknown means. Sprig sympathizes with her and wants to help her. Meanwhile, back in town, just as Mayor Toadstool is turning the townsfolk into a mob to hunt for the beast, Hop Pop learns that Sprig is missing and takes Polly into the woods to "rescue" him. Everyone catches up and ties Anne down only for the praying mantis, as well as a bigger one, to arrive and begin attacking the frogs. Sprig and Anne team up and defeat the mantis. Sprig then tells everyone that Anne is just trying to get home and that they should help her. While there is apprehension, Hop Pop agrees to take her in.

Anne wants to leave immediately, but Hop Pop informs her that she will be unable to due to the surrounding area being covered in mountains that are frozen over for the season and that she will have to wait a couple of months. Later on, after Sprig says goodnight to Anne, she takes out a music box and opens it, only for nothing to happen. She tries again a few more times before solemnly sighing to herself "Looks like I'm gonna be here for a while".

== Production and broadcasting ==
The episode was directed by Bert Youn; written by series creator Matt Braly and story editor Jack Ferraiolo; and storyboarded by Youn, Kyler Spears, and Yonatan Tal.

On April 26, 2019, before the episode's Disney FanFest released a music video for a vocal version of the opening theme titled ″Welcome to Amphibia″ performed by Celica Gray Westbrook and a two-minute clip during a livestream. It was originally planned to be used as the show's theme song.

On May 14, 2019, Disney Channel released the trailer, with Disney Channel releasing the final version of the intro 3 days later.

== Critical reception ==
Collider's Dave Trumbore gave both "Anne or Beast?" and "Best Fronds" a 4 stars rating, feeling that they "[served] as a great introduction to the series".
