= All In & The Hardest Thing =

"All In" and "The Hardest Thing"
- Amphibia episodes
- Promotional posters
- Episode nos.: Season 3 Episodes 17 and 18
- Directed by: Roxann Cole; Joe Johnston; Jenn Strickland ("All In" only)
- Written by: Gloria Shen, Jenava Mie & Michele Cavin ("All In"); Todd McClintock & Adam Colás ("The Hardest Thing")
- Original air dates: May 7, 2022 ("All In"); May 14, 2022 ("The Hardest Thing")
- Running time: 48 minutes ("All In"); 29 minutes ("The Hardest Thing")

Guest appearances
- Haley Tju as Marcy Wu; Anna Akana as Sasha Waybright; Troy Baker as Captain Grime; Keith David as King Andrias; Michelle Dockery as Lady Olivia; Zehra Fazal as General Yunan; RuPaul as Mr. X; Whoopi Goldberg as Mother Olm; Susanne Blakeslee as Valeriana; Lo Mutuc (Note: Credited as Charlyne Yi) as The Guardian

Episode chronology
← Previous "The Beginning of the End"	Next → —
- Amphibia season 3

The two-part series finale of Amphibia consisted of the show's third season's 17th and 18th episodes, the 57th and 58th episodes overall, and the 105th and 106th segments overall: "All In" and "The Hardest Thing". Both episodes were directed by Roxann Cole and Joe Johnston. "All In" originally aired on Disney Channel on May 7, 2022, with "The Hardest Thing" airing the following week.

"All In" revolves around Anne, Sasha, and their allies trying to stop King Andrias and Darcy (who is Marcy being controlled by the Core) from conquering Earth, while "The Hardest Thing" revolves around Anne, Sasha, and Marcy gaining superpowers from the calamity gems as they attempt to save Amphibia from being destroyed by the Core, which has taken control of the moon and is trying to crash it onto Amphibia's surface.

Both "All In" and "The Hardest Thing" received critical acclaim from both audiences, critics, and fans of the show alike, with strong praise going towards its fluid animation, voice acting, emotional weight and tone, writing, action sequences, cultural references, positive influential message, musical score, character development, LGBTQ representation, scale and cinematography, with many calling both episodes an epic, perfect, and bittersweet conclusion to the mature coming-of-age themes and character arcs of the show. Both episodes garnered a total of 0.35 million viewers when they premiered, with "All In" garnering a 0.10 rating, and "The Hardest Thing" a 0.08 rating in the 18-49 demographics.

== Plot ==
External videos
- The Last Episode of Amphibia | S3 E18 | Full Episode | Disney Channel Animation — Official upload of The Hardest Thing onto YouTube

=== "All In" ===
The episode begins with a flashback of Anne, Sasha, and Marcy pulling a prank on their school with a K-pop dance party, but they are all caught and sent to the principal's office. While Sasha and Marcy are let off the hook, Principal Murphy has a talk with Anne about letting her friends rope her into doing the prank. She asks Anne to write an essay about who she wants to be and what she wants to do with her life, then wishes her an early happy birthday.

In the present, Anne, Sasha, Sprig, Polly, Hop Pop, Grime, Olivia, Yunan, Frobo, Joe Sparrow, and Domino 2 are in restraints in a big circle inside Andrias' castle while he is about to invade Earth. He then announces his invasion plans to the people of Los Angeles and unleashes his robot army, along with two giant mind-controlled herons. Anne and her friends all manage to escape with the help of Frobo and land safely in a swimming pool. Hop Pop recognizes the herons as the ones who killed Sprig and Polly's parents. Anne and her friends fight off the robots, but more arrive and surround them; they are rescued by Mr. X and Anne's parents, who are now FBI agents. They all regroup at the school, where Anne's parents supply some homemade Thai food and Polly upgrades Frobo with technology from the school's metal shop. Meanwhile, in the Core's hive mind, Marcy meets Andrias' father King Aldrich, who creates a fantasy world for her to enjoy so she can be assimilated into the Core.

Back at the school, Anne and Sasha come up with a plan: Anne, her parents, the Plantars, Domino 2, and Frobo will fight off the herons and the robot army while Sasha, Grime, Yunan, Olivia, and Joe Sparrow sneak into the castle to shut down its force field. Meanwhile at the castle, while Darcy is having fun destroying the city, Andrias remembers the day he first met Marcy and the moment he proposed his plan to stop her and her friends from fulfilling the prophecy to the Core. Back in the present, Anne and her team defeat more robots, but face trouble when the Plantars' trauma surfaces due to the herons. However, they manage to overcome their trauma, defeat the herons using the Plantar family hunting dance, and free them from Andrias' control, ordering them to destroy more robots. Meanwhile, Sasha and her team manage to infiltrate the castle and reach the force field generator. However, three Cloak-Bots who are defending the generator attack the four, but Yunan and Olivia, whom the latter is given a laser blaster, fight them, separating Sasha’s group from them. Upon reaching the generator, Sasha and Grime are confronted by Darcy, and they begin to fight.

Back outside, Andrias arrives at the U.S. Bank Tower in a mech suit and gives an ultimatum to Anne; if she can beat him in combat, then he will call off the invasion, but if she cannot, he will destroy the city. Realizing who she wants to be, Anne accepts the challenge and flies on Domino 2 to the Bank Tower, where she talks to Andrias before unleashing her powers to begin the fight. She is initially overpowered, while Sasha and Grime try to fight off Darcy; Sasha ends up being hit by a dagger during the fight, and Grime tries to save her, which results in Darcy cutting off his arm. During Anne's fight with Andrias, she tells him that she feels sorry for him due to burying his feelings and closing himself off from others for almost a thousand years. As the fight rages on, Anne starts to become exhausted and is on the brink of defeat, but Mr. X and Anne's parents manage to empower Anne to continue the fight by playing her favorite song throughout the city. Both she and Sasha momentarily gain the upper hand, though the latter is injured by Darcy sneaking up on her and slashing her from behind. Meanwhile, in the Core's hive mind, Marcy begins to realize that none of what she sees is real, including her friends. She realizes that she forced Anne and Sasha to go to another world against their will, exclaims to Aldrich that she is done running away from reality and that she rejects both the Core and Aldrich who angrily leaves her to sit in pitch-black silence.

Anne continues to fight off Andrias but is continuously overpowered as her powers run out. Sprig then shows up on a heron with the piece of paper he found in his family's hidden tunnels, and with help from Mr. X's glasses, reveals that it is a message from Andrias' old friend Leif. Leif reveals through the message that after hiding the Calamity Box on Earth, she knew she couldn't go back to Newtopia, so she started a new life in Wartwood and founded the Plantar family. But, despite all the changes, she never forgot or stopped loving Andrias or all the good times she spent with him and Barrel. She also hopes that Andrias will not close himself off from others and that someday he will forgive her. After hearing this, Andrias breaks down in tears and now truly regrets all the horrible things he has done. Darcy tries to force Andrias to continue fighting, but Sasha defeats her by severing the neural link connecting to the Core's helmet, thus causing the Core to deactivate and freeing Marcy in the process. Andrias lets himself be defeated by Anne by blasting through his exo-armor, ending the battle and revealing that Andrias is a cyborg, which is how he was able to live for a thousand years.

With the force field down, everyone rushes toward Marcy, now unconscious, but she wakes up. She apologizes for her actions. Anne and Sasha forgive her, stating that wherever they are, they will always be friends, and everyone shares a group hug. However, the helmet of the Core reactivates and sneaks away. As Mr. X and Anne's parents clean up the damage with the help of the herons, Anne and her friends return to Amphibia, where the Resistance is still defeating Andrias' robot army. When the castle arrives, Olivia declares that Andrias and the Core have been defeated. However, just as everyone thinks it's over, Sprig notices the moon getting closer.

=== "The Hardest Thing" ===
Continuing where the last episode left off, everyone cheers for the victory of defeating Andrias, when the helmet of the Core blasts off into space, takes control of the moon, and drives it closer to Amphibia. When everyone notices it, Andrias reveals that the moon was where the Core's first pet projects were made and that the moon itself has been turned into a doomsday device meant to destroy Amphibia in case it is ever freed from the Core's control. Marcy realizes that the reason the Core is doing this is that it is afraid of being forgotten, so it is going to destroy Amphibia in a final desperate attempt to claim the stones of the Calamity Box for itself, even if it means destroying itself in the process, all out of spite. Mother Olm then arrives, informing Anne, Sasha, and Marcy that the prophecy is near and that they must stop the Core. As everyone gets ready, Mother Olm tells Anne that while the stones themselves aren't strong enough to stop the Core, there is a hidden power that will work when someone has all the stones together. However, the cost of using it is the user's life.

When Anne arrives at the castle, Valeriana is there, ready to restore the power of the stones to Anne, Sasha, and Marcy. All three girls gain superpowers and colorful armor and fly up into space to stop the Core, but it fights back with an army of space robots. While the girls fight back, Aldrich, through the Core, tries to convince Andrias to help him. In response, Andrias finally stands up to his father and the Core, destroys his crown, and orders his robot army to help the girls stop the moon. However, despite their best efforts, Sasha and Marcy start to become weak, since they are not used to their powers like Anne is, so Anne decides to stop the Core alone by taking all three stones to use the hidden power within them. After a tearful hug and goodbye, Anne returns Sasha and Marcy back to Amphibia and prepares to face the Core.

When they get back, Sasha and Marcy tell the Plantars what Anne is going to do, and Sprig hops on Frobo to try and stop her. Anne and Sprig share a tearful goodbye and Sprig heads back. Anne then uses all the power from the stones to launch a huge blast of white light that destroys the moon, killing the Core in the process. However, she is petrified because of the combined power and falls down to Amphibia. She is then saved by Frobo and Sprig, who take her back to her friends, where she fades away in a stream of leaves, thus leaving everyone grief-stricken.

Suddenly, Anne wakes up in another world with a small house. She enters the house and meets an entity known as the Guardian, as an old computer. After Anne mocks its dated appearance, it takes the form of Anne's Cat Domino, having saved Anne's soul and put it in a new body as a backup. The Guardian reveals that it created the stones 10,000 years ago and that Anne was the only one to use their power for good. It also offers that Anne takes its place as the new guardian, but Anne declines, saying that she still has her whole life ahead of her. The Guardian accepts this and resurrects Anne so she can live her life and probably become the new guardian after her life ends in 78 years. After her revival, Anne sees her friends still mourning her "death." After Sprig realizes that Anne is alive, the Plantars, Sasha, Grime, Marcy, and Frobo happily reunite with her and Anne then finds shards of the stones in her pocket.

Marcy states that the shards are a one-way trip home, so the trio bids farewell to their Amphibian friends. Marcy says goodbye to Olivia, Yunan, and a remourseful Andrias, Sasha and Grime say goodbye to each other while crying emotionally, and Anne says goodbye to the Plantars and gives Sprig her cell phone. All three girls then head home with flower crowns on their heads, and when the portal closes, the shards and the Calamity Box turn to dust and disappear. With that, the frogs, toads, and newts all decide to rebuild their world together, with Polly getting a strand of hair.

Nine months later, Amphibia has now been restored to its original state, with everybody celebrating the defeat of the Core, and Andrias, now going blind and refusing his cybernetic enhancements, along with Barley, Blair, and Branson serving time for their crimes by helping to fix it. Everyone else is living happy lives, with Grime, Olivia, and Yunan as the toad and newt delegates for the new Amphibia government, Polly is now a fully grown frog, and Sprig is cataloging all the creatures in Amphibia using Anne's phone. As a statue of Anne is built within the center of Wartwood in her honor for saving Amphibia, Sprig goes on a journey with Ivy to unexplored territory that Grime discovered.

Ten years later on Earth, Andrias's attack, called "Frog-vasion", is questioned to be a hoax by the news. Sasha (who now works as a children's psychologist) and Marcy (who now works as a webcomic author) go to see Anne for her 23rd birthday. Anne now works as a herpetologist at the Aquarium of the Pacific, where she remodeled the amphibian section to look exactly like Amphibia, even naming a little pink frog Sprig. She then leaves to celebrate her birthday with her friends.

During the credits, a montage of important places in Amphibia is shown, with the final shot being a new group photo of Anne, Sasha, and Marcy.

== Production ==
Both the titles and the time lengths for both episodes were revealed by Matt Braly on both a ScreenRant interview and a Twitter post he made. Braly's Twitter posts talk about how much work, love, care, and effort he and his team have made into these last two episodes. Matt Braly even stated that the episode before these two "The Beginning of the End" was part of the finale since it led up to these episodes and was a little bit longer than normal episodes. Matt Braly also considers the episode "The Hardest Thing" his favorite episode.

Brian Sounalath made his last voice recording for Mr. Boonchuy for "All In" on March 4, 2022.

When Braly was making the last two episodes he claimed that the friendship between Anne, Sasha, and Marcy was creative, especially when they met other new friends in Amphibia, which allowed their friendship to grow stronger, stating that "You'd amazed when you go outside of that friendship, outside of that bubble, and you start hanging out with different people, because it unlocks different things in you."

=== Deleted scenes ===
In some storyboard scenes, Marcy was originally supposed to be depicted in her containment suit for the remainder of the finale. There was also a cut final scene after the credits, though in a non-canon way for comedic purposes from the production crew, where Anne, having already died at age 91 due to Alzheimer's disease, was sent back to the world of the Guardian to take its place. However, Anne does not remember and fades away, to the Guardian's frustration. The last shot is of the stones depicted as shooting stars.

== Reception ==
"The Hardest Thing" was favored by the LGBT community because, near the end, a heart-shaped sticker with the colors of the bisexual flag can be seen on the rear-view mirror of Sasha's car, which implied that she was bisexual, which Matt Braly confirmed; it was also a reference to Sasha's voice actress, Anna Akana, also being bisexual. The episode also hinted that there was a romance between Lady Olivia and General Yunan.

Hope Mullinax from The Geeky Waffle claimed that the episode "The Hardest Thing" was very sad and had lots of consequences, especially with Anne and Sprig never seeing each other again, saying "It's choice after choice where our characters have to choose where they end up. They must say goodbye to people they love with no certain future of reuniting." Mullinax described "All In" as an emotionally roller coaster where all the characters' journeys come together, complementing Anne's journey of finding out who she is supposed to be, as seen in the flashback. In her own words, "All In" is described as "a spectacle to watch", and she adds that "Matt Braly and his team should be very proud."

Jade King, on the pop culture website TheGamer, praised the episode "All In" for the dramatic battles between Anne and Andrias and Sasha and Darcy. King stated how nervous she was about the episode due to the many individual storylines coming together, even after Matt Braly told her ahead of time to expect a "blockbuster filled with epic moments and worthwhile payoff." King also praised the episode "The Hardest Thing" for its heartfelt ending, even commenting on how Anne's narrative was a good statement on what the show itself stands for. She praised everything shown in the episode for the beauty it had shown and the emotional moments it had, claiming "The final episode is a whirlwind of hesitant farewells."

Matthew Moorcroft from Collider places the episode "The Hardest Thing" as one of the "Top 10 Best Cartoon Show Finales That Still Hold Up", praising the show for its "complex, three-dimensional character writing, engaging storytelling, and pushing the boundaries of what can be shown on children's television with some of the darkest moments in Disney Channel history." Moorcroft also praises the finale for having the characters face their emotional baggage, and claims that "while there is a bittersweet nature to their departure, it has maturity unlike other shows and allows our characters to have lives away from each other."
