= List of Amphibia episodes =

The following is a list of episodes for the American animated television series Amphibia created by Matt Braly that premiered on Disney Channel on June 17, 2019. The series features the voices of Brenda Song, Justin Felbinger, Bill Farmer, Amanda Leighton, Anna Akana, Troy Baker, Haley Tju, and Keith David. A second season premiered on July 11, 2020, and a third and final season premiered on October 2, 2021. The series ended on May 14, 2022.

== Series overview ==
Season	Segments	Episodes	Originally released	
Season	Segments	Episodes	First released	Last released
Pilot			—N/a	—N/a
1	39	20	June 17, 2019	July 18, 2019
2	36	20	July 11, 2020	May 22, 2021
3	31	18	October 2, 2021	May 14, 2022

== Episodes ==
=== Pilot ===
An animatic pilot episode was created during the series' development, and was later reworked into the episode "Best Fronds". The pilot was leaked online in April 2024, alongside other pilots and production pieces from Disney and Cartoon Network.

Title
"Amphibiland"
After stealing a mysterious music box from a thrift store for her friends Sasha and Marcy, a teenage girl named Anne Boonchuy is transported to Amphibiland, a world inhabited by talking amphibians. She is taken in by Sprig, his sister Polly, and their grandfather Hop Pop. Anne convinces Sprig to abandon his farm chores to have fun instead. When they come across a nest filled with giant eggs, Anne tries to pressure Sprig into stealing them, but he refuses. A giant chicken then comes and attacks Anne. She and Sprig defeating it using fireworks from Anne's bag. Anne then apologizes to Sprig. Meanwhile, a mysterious toad interrogates Sasha, who has also been transported to Amphibiland.

=== Season 1 (2019) ===
No. overall	No. in season	Title	Directed by	Written by	Storyboarded by	Original release date	Prod. code	U.S. viewers (millions)
1	1	"Anne or Beast?"	Bert Youn	Matt Braly & Jack Ferraiolo	Kyler Spears, Yonatan Tal & Bert Youn	June 17, 2019 (Note: This episode was released on DisneyNOW and Disney Channel's official YouTube channel on June 14, 2019.)	103	0.39
1	1	"Best Fronds"	Derek Kirk Kim	Matt Braly & Jack Ferraiolo	Aaron Austin & Hannah Ayoubi	June 17, 2019	103	0.39
In the town of Wartwood, the amphibian townsfolk are in an uproar over a supposed beast. Sprig Plantar, the grandson of Hop Pop and older brother of Polly, becomes determined to capture the beast, only to learn that it is a human teenage girl named Anne Boonchuy who was transported there by a mysterious music box. He ends up befriending her, but the townsfolk plan to kill her. A giant praying mantis interrupts their attempt and Anne helps the people defeat it. Sprig convinces the reluctant townsfolk to help Anne find a way home and Hop Pop reluctantly allows Anne to stay with them. In a flashback, Anne steals the music box from a thrift store at the urging of her friends and transports them all to Amphibia. In the present, Anne convinces Sprig to take her to the lake, but Hop Pop locks the door to keep Anne inside. Anne convinces Sprig to steal the key and they find a lake with a keep out sign, but ignore it. While swimming, they are attacked by a giant snake but defeat it with Anne accepting Sprig as a friend. Meanwhile, a mysterious toad interrogates Anne's human friend Sasha who also wound up in Amphibia where the toad had found Anne's other shoe.
2	2	"Cane Crazy"	Derek Kirk Kim	Adam Colás	Hannah Ayoubi & Derek Kirk Kim	June 18, 2019	101	0.46
2	2	"Flood, Sweat and Tears"	Derek Kirk Kim	Gloria Shen	Drew Applegate & Cheyenne Curtis	June 18, 2019	101	0.46
Anne accidentally breaks Hop Pop's favorite cane. Worried that she will get kicked out, she, Sprig, and Polly visit the town wood-smith Leopold Loggle so he can fix it. He tells them that he cannot, but directs them to the Doom Tree which is the cane's source. The tree ends up being a giant stick bug and they fight it before scaring it away with termites while also messing up Loggle's store. Anne comes clean to Hop Pop about breaking his cane and prepares to leave, but Hop Pop tells her that she can stay and simply wanted her to respect him. He simply has her do the dishes for the incident. As Anne and Sprig's friendship continues to grow, Anne's bedroom in the basement gets flooded by a leak caused by burrow bugs. Hop Pop tries to fix it and in the meantime, Anne bunks with Sprig in his room. While happy at first, they soon discover that they cannot stand each other as roommates and try to fix the leak. They encounter giant lampreys and defeat them while also draining the basement. Anne and Sprig later find that being honest with each other has made them even better friends. Anne relocates to the couch until the living room starts to flood.
3	3	"Hop Luck"	Bert Youn	Matt Braly & Jack Ferraiolo	Kathryn Marusik & Kyler Spears	June 19, 2019	102	0.37
3	3	"Stakeout"	Bert Youn	Michele Cavin	Jenn Strickland & Steve Wolfhard	June 19, 2019	102	0.37
To win the town's annual potluck and avoid the "Shame Cage" again, Anne leads the family on a quest to make pizza. After gathering most of the ingredients, they go to get tomatoes, which can only be obtained from a giant carnivorous tomato plant. They get swallowed by the plant and lose the ingredients in their stomach. Anne apologizes for putting the family in danger as she just wanted to help them win for once. Through Hop Pop's old cookbook, they find that they can eat their way out of the plant. Though the family loses again, their dish still turns out better than before. Anne and Hop Pop cannot stop arguing. Worried that this could lead to the family splitting, Sprig steals some of the corn to have Anne and Hop Pop go on a stakeout. While they wait, Anne and Hop Pop talk about how they each miss a certain thing; Anne her home and Hop Pop the old ways. They then try each other's drinks, which give them strange hallucinations, including Sprig as an evil corn monster. Once the hallucinations stop, Anne and Hop Pop appreciate how they both have each other's back. However, Polly drinks the remainder of Anne's drink and hallucinates a rock monster.
4	4	"The Domino Effect"	Derek Kirk Kim	Story by : Jeff Trammell; Teleplay by : Gloria Shen	Kathryn Marusik & Kyler Spears	June 20, 2019	107	0.41
4	4	"Taking Charge"	Bert Youn	Matt Braly & Jack Ferraiolo	Jenn Strickland & Steve Wolfhard	June 20, 2019	107	0.41
Anne and Sprig rescue a small cat-like caterpillar who resembles Anne's pet cat back at home, Domino. Naming the creature Domino II, Anne sneaks him into the house as Hop Pop has a firm stance against having pets. Domino II ends up being a hassle to own, but Anne continues to keep him. Eventually, Domino II makes a cocoon and Hop Pop finds out, telling them that it is a Coastal Killapillar. Domino II emerges and attacks the family, forcing Anne to finally get rid of the creature. Sprig later compares the incident to adopting her into their family and gives Anne a stuffed doll version of Domino II. Anne shows the Plantars her favorite show Suspicion Island, which Sprig and Polly like but Hop Pop does not. Anne later finds that someone used her phone's battery to watch the other episodes. Hop Pop tells them about Zapapedes, centipedes with electricity, and one has enough power to charge Anne's phone. While on the trip, the family gets suspicious of each other. Hop Pop then admits to using the phone and jumps into a pile of Zapapedes to redeem himself which boosts the battery power of Anne's phone to 10,000%. Anne later forgives Hop Pop, but he almost spoils the show for them.
5	5	"Anne Theft Auto"	Derek Kirk Kim	Story by : Justin Charlebois; Teleplay by : Jenava Mie	Drew Applegate & Cheyenne Curtis	June 24, 2019	104	0.39
5	5	"Breakout Star"	Derek Kirk Kim	Gloria Shen	Aaron Austin & Hannah Ayoubi	June 24, 2019	104	0.39
Hop Pop allows Anne to ride Bessie, the family snail, but needs her to read Bessie's history before doing so. Anne thinks it is better to ride by experience, so she and Sprig take Bessie for a joy ride. They get stuck in the forest and Sprig rides with Mrs. Croaker to get Hop Pop while Anne reads Bessie's history to pass the time. Anne gets attacked by savage hedgehogs, but having learned patience, Anne manages to get Bessie to escape, picks up Sprig from a wily Croaker, and heads for home so Anne can finish the book. Upon finishing, Hop Pop allows Anne to drive Bessie whenever she wants. Anne gets a pimple breakout and tries to hide it from the townsfolk, but when they see her pimples, they think they are ruby warts and make her a celebrity. Seeing this as an opportunity to get the town's vote, Toadstool and his assistant Toadie invite her to the town hall and take her to public events. Anne's skin later clears up, and she asks the Plantars for help. They find red berries that look like pimples and attach them to her face. Seeing that the Plantars like her for what she is, Anne wipes off the berries and gets shunned by the town again, but Toadstool gets humiliated for insulting the town.
6	6	"Sprig vs. Hop Pop"	Bert Youn	Adam Colás	Kathryn Marusik & Kyler Spears	June 25, 2019	105	0.39
6	6	"Girl Time"	Bert Youn	Story by : Emily Brundige; Teleplay by : Michele Cavin	Jenn Strickland & Steve Wolfhard	June 25, 2019	105	0.39
Seeing that Hop Pop does not take any suggestions from anyone, Sprig challenges Hop Pop for the control of the farm. Sprig surprisingly defeats Hop Pop and starts to take all suggestions. Seeing that the farm is falling apart and that Sprig is mad with power, the girls get Hop Pop, who was among beetles in the cemetery and has learned humility. Hop Pop challenges Sprig to a rematch, during which he promises Sprig that he will consider some of the suggestions. Sprig forfeits the match, and everything goes back to normal. Hop Pop is later delivered some suggestions, but he rejects some of them. Anne is perturbed to see that Polly acts too boyish, so she decides to take her out for some "girl time". Despite Anne's best efforts, Polly does not like doing girly things and Anne insults her. However, Anne was using Hop Pop's wallet for their expenses, which are simply IOUs, and she and the Plantars are arrested. Polly decides to do the spitting contest to get a gold trophy to pay their debt but feels ashamed. Anne apologizes for what she said and Polly surmises the energy to beat the record and get the trophy. It gets broken apart to pay the debt and the Plantars fashion a piece into a new trophy.
7	7	"Dating Season"	Bert Youn	Adam Colás	Aaron Austin & Hannah Ayoubi	June 26, 2019	106	0.39
7	7	"Anne Vs. Wild"	Derek Kirk Kim	Jenava Mie	Drew Applegate & Cheyenne Curtis	June 26, 2019	106	0.39
Anne and Sprig run into Ivy Sundew, Sprig's childhood friend. Believing that Sprig possibly likes her, Anne, Hop Pop, and Ivy's mother Felicia attempt to set them up at the Firefly Formal forcing them to perform a special dance. However, they have no interest in wanting to date each other, so they leave the dance together and watch fireflies. Not wanting to let the courtship be ruined, Anne and the others follow the two kids only to get captured by a couple of giant love doves. Sprig and Ivy then head off to rescue them. After the rescue, Sprig comes to realize that he is in love with Ivy. Anne wants to spend time with the Plantars and decides to go on a camping trip with them, despite hating it. Anne claims that she likes extreme camping and a survivalist named Soggy Joe takes them to a dangerous part of the woods. They are attacked by Mudmen, but Anne uses a bath bomb to deter them; revealing that they are wimpy cannibal frogs. Anne comes clean and admits that even though she hates camping, she wanted to feel included. Afterward, she reveals the music box that brought her there. After denying any knowledge of it, Hop Pop secretly learns that it is called the Calamity Box.
8	8	"Contagi-Anne"	Derek Kirk Kim	Michele Cavin	Drew Applegate & Cheyenne Curtis	June 27, 2019	108	0.41
8	8	"Family Shrub"	Bert Youn	Jenava Mie	Aaron Austin & Hannah Ayoubi	June 27, 2019	108	0.41
To get out of working in the rain, Anne pretends to be sick. Unfortunately, this means that the Plantars get sick, so Anne decides to help them out. Shortly, the Plantars begin to develop red leg disease which could be fatal. Feeling guilty, Anne takes the Plantars to the highest mountain to bathe in the healing waters to be cured. When this seemingly does not work, Anne admits that she lied about being sick, but the Plantars forgive her. It turns out that Anne simply fed them red mushrooms; the side effects of which turn the skin red. Anne happily, and comically, cries that the Plantars will be fine. While putting together a family shrub, Anne grows bored as she finds the Plantar family history boring. Hop Pop runs out of glue and goes to the store to get more. Afterward, Anne, Sprig, and Polly discover a secret passage that leads to several rooms under the house that reveal that their ancestors were all incredible people, such as a scientist, a warrior, and treasure seekers, the latter of whom was an honorary Plantar. The group solves puzzles and traps and manages to make it back just in time for Hop Pop, and a glued-on Loggle, to return. They rush into the tunnels with the kids following behind.
9	9	"Lily Pad Thai"	Derek Kirk Kim	Adam Colás	Kathryn Marusik & Kyler Spears	July 1, 2019	109	0.39
9	9	"Plantar's Last Stand"	Bert Youn	Gloria Shen	Jenn Strickland & Steve Wolfhard	July 1, 2019	109	0.39
While at Stumpy's Diner, Anne overhears obnoxious food critic Albus Duckweed complain about the food. Having worked in a restaurant all her life, Anne decides to help an unenthusiastic Stumpy change the overall look and menu of his diner. Going with a Thai theme, the makeover is a huge success, but Duckweed is still unimpressed and wants something special. They decide to cook Kraken, but it comes to life and starts attacking everyone. They defeat it and Duckweed changes his mind; finding the experience wonderful. Stumpy takes to the new look and tells Anne her parents would be proud. The Plantars learn that Toadstool is raising the rent and thus will be unable to keep their stand. Anne comes up with the Plantar's Potion, a regular fruit drink that regales increased nutrients. After some reluctance, Hop Pop takes to the marketing tactic and they can earn more money to save the stand. However, Hop Pop begins using compost to make more and it ends up attracting giant flies. After getting rid of them, Hop Pop comes clean and offers refunds. While Croaker is upset about being lied to, she appreciates his honesty, but the Plantars sadly still lose their stand.
10	10	"Toad Tax"	Derek Kirk Kim	Michele Cavin	Drew Applegate, Cheyenne Curtis & Kyler Spears	July 2, 2019	110	0.50
10	10	"Prison Break"	Bert Youn	Matt Braly & Jack Ferraiolo	Aaron Austin & Hannah Ayoubi	July 2, 2019	110	0.50
Anne is disappointed that nobody in Wartwood respects her. When she meets the foot soldiers of Toad Tower, Anne impresses them with her skills and they make her deputy after telling her that they have come to collect the tax. Sprig becomes jealous but discovers that Toadstool has been squirreling away the tax for himself. Anne begins to regret working with the toads due to their brute force and turns on them. When Sprig outs Toadstool's treachery, the townsfolk turn on Toadstool and the Toads. The Toads decide to tell their captain about Anne while the townspeople praise her heroics. At Toad Tower, Sasha is a prisoner to the Toads. However, she uses her charm to get everyone to like her, much to the chagrin of Captain Grime, their leader. When Percy, a dimwitted soldier, leads a group of a heron to attack the tower, Sasha uses the opportunity to not just escape but also help the Toads. She convinces Grime that to get people to like him, he needs to say nice things to them. The plan works, and the Toads are empowered to fight back the herons. Grime takes a liking to Sasha and makes her lieutenant to the Toad army while she vows to find Anne and Marcy.
11	11	"Grubhog Day"	Derek Kirk Kim	Michele Cavin	Matt Braly & Kim Roberson	July 3, 2019	111	0.44
11	11	"Hop Pop and Lock"	Bert Youn	Matt Braly & Jack Ferraiolo	Jenn Strickland & Steve Wolfhard	July 3, 2019	111	0.44
Wartwood celebrates Grubhog Day with an annual festival. Hop Pop forces Sprig to volunteer to watch over the grubhog, but that means having to miss the fair. Anne suggests bringing the grubhog with them on the rides, but while riding the coaster, a buzzard makes off with it. Anne and Sprig make a sock puppet variant, but Sprig comes clean when they try to cut it open. Hop Pop admits that he put too much pressure on him. While the townsfolk are disappointed that the grubhog is missing, they like the puppet show they put on and decide to make that their annual tradition from now on. Hop Pop reunites with Sylvia Sundew, his crush from long ago. When a dance festival is announced, Hop Pop decides to ask Sylvia but encounters his much better rival Monroe. Hop Pop cannot dance so he ask Anne to teach him to dance. At the dance, Hop Pop and Monroe vie for Sylvia with Monroe being the superior dancer. However, Hop Pop does his freestyle dance, which shocks the audience, only for Sylvia to reveal her bizarre freestyle dance; admitting that she has "a soft spot for the weird ones". As everyone leaves, Hop Pop and Sylvia do a slow dance to Sprig's fiddle.
12	12	"Civil Wart"	Derek Kirk Kim	Jenava Mie	Drew Applegate & Cheyenne Curtis	July 4, 2019	112	0.45
12	12	"Hop-Popular"	Derek Kirk Kim	Adam Colás	Kathryn Marusik & Kyler Spears	July 4, 2019	112	0.45
After the town theater troop gets eaten, Anne decides to show everyone in town the movie Love Choice. Everyone immediately becomes split due to the protagonists' two differing love interests and two factions are made with Sprig and Polly leading their opposing sides. The whole town goes to war with Anne and Hop Pop trying to get Sprig and Polly to end their feud. When Polly's life ends up being in danger, Sprig "sacrifices" himself when he realizes that needs to protect his sister, and everything goes back to normal. To prevent another incident, Anne decides to show the arthouse film My Dinner with Anders. Still sad over losing the stand, Hop Pop decides to run for mayor to oppose Toadstool, much to everyone's delight. Anne, Sprig, and Polly decide to help him win; fearing that he will become depressed if he loses. Hop Pop's popularity soars to the point that Toadstool tells him to forfeit. Instead, they go into the final round in the form of a boxing match that ends with Hop Pop being the winner. However, Hop Pop forgot to campaign outside of Wartwood and Toadstool ends up winning with way more votes. As Hop Pop resigns to his loss, the town of Wartwood supports him and gets him a new stand.
13	13	"Croak & Punishment"	Bert Youn	Gloria Shen	Aaron Austin & Hannah Ayoubi	July 8, 2019	113	0.42
13	13	"Trip to the Archives"	Bert Youn	Michele Cavin	Jenn Strickland & Steve Wolfhard	July 8, 2019	113	0.42
Sprig finds a blue moon shell that he hopes to give to Ivy on her birthday. However, the shell gets stolen so he and Anne play cops to try and find the culprit. After a series of dead ends, they encounter a southern tusk frog named Gunther who is sweet and nice, but when angered turns into a giant monster. Realizing that they have been causing too much trouble, Sprig apologizes and Gunther forgives them. When they return home, they discover that Ivy had taken the shell to clean it. Sprig decides to give it to her early, but she tells him to keep it so that she knows where his house is. Anne and the Plantars go to the archives to learn more about how to get Anne home. Sprig quickly grows bored and tries to get everyone to thrust into an adventure. However, in his haste, he destroys a key piece that was supposed to keep the archive doors open, trapping them all inside. Anne pokes her head through the skylight and gets stuck just as cicadas arrive to graze. Sprig finds the bathroom and the Plantars swim through the pipes and rescues Anne in time. Anne tells Sprig that she needs to find answers even if it means doing boring things and Sprig apologizes.
14	14	"Snow Day"	Derek Kirk Kim	Matt Braly & Jack Ferraiolo	Drew Applegate & Cheyenne Curtis	July 9, 2019	114	0.44
14	14	"Cracking Mrs. Croaker"	Bert Youn	Jenava Mie	Aaron Austin & Hannah Ayoubi	July 9, 2019	114	0.44
Hiber Day is coming to freeze all the frogs, and when that happens someone goes missing never to be seen again. Anne decides to protect the frogs during the freeze, but grows bored and awakens an inebriated Sprig to have fun. Polly ends up being the one that gets taken by a giant albino weasel, Anne and Sprig battle and chase it back to its cavern. Anne discovers that it was just trying to feed its own babies, so she makes an omelet for them in exchange for getting Polly back. As Hiber Day ends, Anne fesses up to what occurred, but Hop Pop tells her that her confessing was very responsible of her. Sprig is very well-liked by everyone, except for Mrs. Croaker. After misunderstanding Anne's suggestion, Sprig sets off to find out how to make Croaker like him. They break into her house and find a photo of a man named Jonah. Thinking that he is Croaker's long lost love, Sprig goes out to find him and bring him to her. Jonah then turns out to be an assassin and Croaker's arch-enemy from back when she was a spy. After capturing him, she tells Sprig that not everyone is going to like him and that he should be okay with that, but seeing that he cares, she will try to tolerate him.
15	15	"A Night at the Inn"	Derek Kirk Kim	Gloria Shen	Kathryn Marusik & Kyler Spears	July 10, 2019	115	0.34
15	15	"Wally and Anne"	Bert Youn	Adam Colás	Jenn Strickland & Steve Wolfhard	July 10, 2019	115	0.34
After Anne and the Plantars return from the archives, Bessie suddenly breaks down when it begins to rain. They stay at the Dandy Lion Inn, run by a kind bullfrog couple named Teddy and Martha. Polly, who will not admit to being afraid, tries to sleep by herself, only to discover that not only is her family gone, but that the bullfrogs are cannibals and is about to eat the family. She rescues her family and Anne mixes their stash of vinegar and baking soda, causing the inn to explode just as they escape with Bessie. Hop Pop congratulates Polly on her independence, but Polly decides to sleep with Hop Pop for the night. Anne spots the Moss Man, a mythical being, but the Plantars do not believe her. One-Eyed Wally claims to have seen the Moss Man and agrees to go on an adventure to look for it and take a picture to prove that she is not crazy. Along the way, Anne begins to warm up to Wally who spouts his philosophy about not caring what others think of him. Anne is close to snapping a picture, but she misses her chance to save Wally from falling to his doom. Afterward, she learns to accept not caring what people think of her and Wally makes a song about his and Anne's adventure.
16	16	"Family Fishing Trip"	Derek Kirk Kim	Michele Cavin	Drew Applegate & Cheyenne Curtis	July 11, 2019	116	0.48
16	16	"Bizarre Bazaar"	Bert Youn	Gloria Shen	Aaron Austin & Hannah Ayoubi	July 11, 2019	116	0.48
Sprig looks forward to the family fishing trip and spending time with Hop Pop. However, Hop Pop's girlfriend Sylvia comes along, and Sprig gets jealous of her and tries to get rid of her while Anne tries to hang glide. Just as Sprig gets rid of Sylvia, Hop Pop tells him that Sylvia told him to spend time with him. Sylvia just so happens to be in harm's way by a giant crab and Sprig rescues her using Anne's hang glider, much to her annoyance. He finally admits that he was jealous of Sylvia, but is now glad that she has him. Polly also hang glides better than Anne who wants to eat the crab. Anne learns of the Bizarre Bazaar, a nightly market that disappears annually. Anne and Sprig decide to take the music box there for answers despite Hop Pop forbidding them to. Just as it seems that they are about to get answers, Anne's backpack gets stolen and she and Sprig have to compete in a race against the Wrecker. They end up losing horribly and the Bazaar disappears. The Wrecker turns out to be Hop Pop in disguise who was trying to teach them a lesson. They agree to listen to him from now on and wait for his answers, but Hop Pop secretly buries the box in the yard instead.
17	17	"Cursed!"	Derek Kirk Kim	Jenava Mie	Kathryn Marusik & Kyler Spears	July 15, 2019	117	0.47
17	17	"Fiddle Me This"	Bert Youn	Matt Braly & Jack Ferraiolo	Jenn Strickland & Steve Wolfhard	July 15, 2019	117	0.47
Sprig is scared of Maddie, his fiancée, so Anne helps him break up with her. Afterward, Sprig and Anne wake up to find that they are a furball and a bird, respectively. They believe that Maddie cursed them, but she denies any wrongdoing. She helps find the true culprit, the candy maker Barry who cursed them due to a petty mishap. A fight breaks out with Maddie the victor and Barry changes Anne and Sprig back to normal while also getting a large supply of candy in return. Sprig apologizes for judging Maddie and they decide to simply be friends from now on, though Maddie is still creepy about it. Fearing that his grandchildren's future is in jeopardy, Hop Pop has Sprig enter a talent show that has come to Wartwood and has him practice his fiddle until it is flawless, although Sprig simply wants to have his fun rather than winning a prize. While his presentation goes off without a hitch, a giant bat swoops in and grabs Sprig. Anne and the others work together to rescue Sprig with Polly using her "singing" to discombobulate the bat and take it down. Hop Pop apologizes for pushing Sprig, but to their surprise, the judges award the Plantars with the trophy.
18	18	"The Big Bugball Game"	Bert Youn	Michele Cavin	Aaron Austin & Hannah Ayoubi	July 16, 2019	118	0.37
18	18	"Combat Camp"	Derek Kirk Kim	Adam Colás	Drew Applegate & Cheyenne Curtis	July 16, 2019	118	0.37
The town is celebrating Harvest Day, and part of the celebration is the Big Bugball Game. Farmers and Townies always go up against each other with the former usually losing. When Hop Pop sees that Anne is a natural, he has her join the team. She ends up being a handful, but over time learns to be a team player by taking part in trust exercises. The Farmers are doing well, resulting in the Townies blinding Anne. Using her trust exercises, Anne manages to play and Sprig makes the winning dunk, making it the first time the Farmers win. The Townies have to wear an itchy turkey costume for their loss. While Hop Pop heads to Crop Con, Anne, Sprig, and Polly are forced to stay at a daycare center with Tritonio Espada who reveals himself to be a daring sword fighter and trains the kids to be weapon experts. While Sprig and Polly do fine, Anne is constantly criticized by Tritonio. She eventually confronts him and he tells her that he is trying to make her be her best and that her teachers at home are likely doing the same thing. It turns out that Tritonio is a criminal who needed help robbing a train, but the kids use their training to capture and have him arrested. When Hop Pop returns, he nor the kids want to talk.
19	19	"Children of the Spore"	Derek Kirk Kim	Matt Braly & Jack Ferraiolo	Kathryn Marusik & Kyler Spears	July 17, 2019	119	0.41
19	19	"Anne of the Year"	Bert Youn	Jenava Mie	Drew Applegate, Silver Paul & Jenn Strickland	July 17, 2019	119	0.41
Fed up with the children disobeying him, Hop Pop buys a potion from the mysterious Apothecary Gary which when used on someone, makes them more compliable. When he sees that it works, albeit in an unsettling manner, he uses it again, but it turns them into mushroom zombies. Gary reveals that he is a mushroom possessing a frog and that he has zombified all the Wartwood citizens. Hop Pop frees Bessie who proceeds to devour the mushrooms, turning everyone to normal and defeating Gary in the process. Hop Pop apologizes for trying to control the kids while the kids agree to be more respectful to Hop Pop. For the Frog of the Year Ceremony, Anne discovers that she has won and as thanks, decides to throw the most epic party for all of Wartwood. In the meantime, Anne wants Sprig to ask Ivy out. Despite her best and impressive efforts, the party becomes a giant disaster. Hop Pop reveals that they voted for her, not because she was flawless, but because she grew as a person and the party resumes. Ivy asks Sprig out and he reciprocates. Anne is told to meet someone outside and discovers that it is Sasha, much to each others' delight. However, she also brought the Toads with her.
20	20	"Reunion"	Derek Kirk Kim, Bert Youn & Kyler Spears	Adam Colás, Gloria Shen, Matt Braly & Jack Ferraiolo	Cheyenne Curtis, Nate Maurer, Kyler Spears, Jenn Strickland & Steve Wolfhard	July 18, 2019	120	0.34
Three months prior, Sasha persuades Anne to ditch school for the latter's birthday. Sasha also forces Anne to abandon her birthday celebration at home to go and steal the music box from a thrift store. In the present, continuing from "Anne of the Year", the Toads round up all the Wartwood citizens by claiming that they are throwing a banquet. At Toad Tower, Sprig quickly deduces that they are prisoners and incites a riot. Anne learns from Sasha that they plan on killing Hop Pop because his run for mayor has caused a rebellion to surface. Anne tries to free all of Wartwood, but they are captured. Sprig outs Sasha for being a bully and she and Anne get into a sword fight with Anne overcoming Sasha. The Tower is blown up by One-Eyed Wally as everyone flees. Sasha tells Anne that she is better off without her and falls off the tower, but is caught by Grime and the Toads take her away. The Plantars promise Anne that they will do everything to help her get home with her friends.

=== Season 2 (2020–21) ===
Note: Episodes in this season are presented by production order, as provided by series creator Matt Braly and listed on Disney+, for continuity reasons.

No. overall	No. in season	Title	Directed by	Written by	Storyboarded by	Original release date	U.S. viewers (millions)
21	1	"Handy Anne"	Kyler Spears	Adam Colás	Drew Applegate & Nate Maurer	July 11, 2020	0.39
21	1	"Fort in the Road"	Joe Johnston	Todd McClintock	Eleisiya Arocha & Silver Paul	July 11, 2020	0.39
Anne and the Plantars make preparations to go to Newtopia to get answers to the music box. Hop Pop hires Chuck to house sit for them, but Anne thinks he is incompetent and buys a potion from Loggle. She uses it on the plants to fortify the house, but it creates a vegetable monster that destroys it and Anne ends up defeating it. Hop Pop tells her that she does not need to worry as Chuck is revealed to be an expert builder and rebuilds the house in seconds. Hop Pop claims that he has left the music box with his contacts and Anne and the Plantars begin their journey to the city of Newtopia. The Plantars are on the road to Newtopia. Sprig and Anne want to experience exciting adventures, but Hop Pop forbids them to. As a result, all their requests to stop and see sights are denied. Anne and Sprig manage to find some ruins and enter to find an ancient computer. Hop Pop follows them and ends up stuck on an assembly line. They manage to destroy the computer and escape. Anne and Sprig apologize for disobeying Hop Pop, while Hop Pop admits that he was being too harsh and decides to treat everyone to the ice cream they passed by earlier. A robot emerges and begins to follow them.
22	2	"The Ballad of Hopediah Plantar"	Jenn Strickland	Michele Cavin	Anna O'Brian & Eddie West	July 18, 2020	0.22
22	2	"Anne Hunter"	Kyler Spears	Jenava Mie	Inbal Breda & Cassie Zwart	July 18, 2020	0.22
The family arrives at Bittyburg, a literal small town where its tiny citizens are being forced to pay the ruthless outlaw Judro Hasselback. Hop Pop fends him off, but he returns with the rest of his family led by Mama Hasselback. The Plantars and Anne are forced to flee. Hop Pop suddenly has an epiphany and decides to return to the town to save the civilians. They come in with a plan that works, but when Hop Pop is injured, the citizens of Bittyburg suddenly produce sharp teeth and attack the Hasselbacks, allowing the family to leave. Elsewhere, the robot continues to follow in the desert. The family makes a stop in a forest where they discover that they are low on food and need to gather some more. Anne thinks that hunting will be fun but quickly grows bored even though Sprig is trying to teach her the ways of the hunter which include a funny hypnotic dance. While Anne gathers food, the rest of the family gets captured by a "scorpileo", a scorpion with leonine features. With the guidance of a Sprig hallucination, Anne uses what she learned as a hunter and saves the family from the "scorpileo". The robot is still following them but keeps bumping into trees.
23	3	"Truck Stop Polly"	Joe Johnston	Gloria Shen	Drew Applegate & Nate Maurer	July 25, 2020	0.44
23	3	"A Caravan Named Desire"	Jenn Strickland	Adam Colás	Eleisiya Arocha & Silver Paul	July 25, 2020	0.44
Polly begins acting out and becoming a nuisance to the family. They decide to stop by a rest stop, during which Polly switches places with a pink stone in the hopes of freaking them out. Instead, they drive off, leaving Polly to sulk with the other truckers including Soggy Joe. She learns that the pink rock is an egg belonging to a Roc and she and Joe race after the wagon just as the family notices something is off. Polly uses her ability to conduct electricity and defeats the Roc. She apologizes for her behavior while the rest of the family admits that they miss home and understand Polly's plight. Anne and the Plantars meet an acting troupe led by famed actress and playwright Renee Frodgers. Wanting to fulfill his dream of being an actor, Hop Pop chooses to have his family journey with them for a while. However, Hop Pop learns that the acting troupe robs banks while they perform as Renee tells him that nobody cares about the dramatic arts and this is their only way to stay afloat. At the next town over, Hop Pop finally outs Renee and a chase ensues, ending with a sandworm knocking Renee out and her getting arrested. Anne and the Plantars flee when they are to be questioned by the police.
24	4	"Quarreler's Pass"	Kyler Spears	Todd McClintock	Anna O'Brian & Eddie West	August 1, 2020	0.54
24	4	"Toadcatcher"	Joe Johnston	Michele Cavin	Inbal Breda & Cassie Zwart	August 1, 2020	0.54
Halfway to Newtopia, Sprig and Polly will not stop bickering, so Hop Pop drops them off at Quarreler's Pass, a split road that lets travelers vent their frustrations. The two continue to fight until they end up in a cave belonging to a two-headed olm named Lysil and Angwin who intends to devour them. They finally put their differences aside and use their vocal mimicry to get the olm to fight with itself and escape where they reunite with Hop Pop and Anne. The whole time, Anne had been listening to Hop Pop's non-stop advice on how to get a boyfriend. After listening for far too long, Anne comically kicks Hop Pop off the fwagon (family wagon). Following her defeat by Anne, Sasha has been training to get her revenge on her and the Plantars while also looking after a defeated, lazy, and out-of-shape Grime, who is now wanted by Newtopia for his crimes. Percy and Braddock, Grime's remaining soldiers, accidentally reveal his whereabouts to the newt soldier General Yunan. As they flee, Grime deduces that Sasha misses Anne and she admits that she does not want to lose Grime. They manage to outwit Yunan together. Being reinvigorated by the event, they decide to take over Newtopia. Sasha vows that she and Anne are not through.
25	5	"Swamp and Sensibility"	Kyler Spears	Gloria Shen	Eleisiya Arocha & Silver Paul	August 8, 2020	0.32
25	5	"Wax Museum"	Jenn Strickland	Jenava Mie	Drew Applegate & Nate Maurer	August 8, 2020	0.32
The family makes a stop in Ribbitvale, a highly affluent, upper-class town. They discover that One-Eyed Wally is there and is the son of Wigbert Ribbiton, one of the richest frogs in Amphibia. Wally does not want his father to find out about his double life in Wartwood, but Anne makes it known, angering his father. Wally challenges him to a game of beast polo for his freedom and wins. Despite this, he wants his dad to accept him for who he is as he still wants to associate as a Ribbiton. His father finally accepts him before revealing that he shares some of his son's quirks from Wartwood. The family stop by Stony Gulch where the residents marvel at Anne's appearance. This leads them to the wax museum run by the Curator. When Anne spots a CD player, the Curator promises to give it to her if she does a show for one night. However, he instead reveals his sinister plan to coat her in wax and be a permanent exhibit. The Plantars catch on and try to rescue her by melting the wax off the rest of the exhibits that come to life and get their revenge on the Curator by presumably killing him. Anne apologizes for being reckless while Sprig reveals that he snagged the CD player for her. Note: "Wax Museum" serves as a tribute to Gravity Falls with the participation of the show's creator, Alex Hirsch.
26	6	"Marcy at the Gates"	Joe Johnston & Jenn Strickland	Adam Colás & Matt Braly	Anna O'Brian, Eddie West, Aaron Austin & Cassie Zwart	August 15, 2020	0.40
After days of traveling, the family finally arrives at Newtopia, only to find that it is closed to all outsiders until an army of giant ants called barbari-ants is gone. They encounter a hooded figure, who turns out to be Anne's other human friend Marcy. They decide to take out the barbari-ants together with Anne wanting to protect Marcy, as she had always been a bit clumsy, while Sprig is suspicious of her after their encounter with Sasha. Marcy proves her capabilities by defeating the queen barbari-ant, pleasing Anne and relieving Sprig. Now able to enter Newtopia and get a warm welcome, Anne tells Marcy about Sasha, and they both promise to find a way home, unaware that they are being watched by the King of Amphibia, who has a secret plot involving the girls as he states that the pieces are coming together.
27	7	"Scavenger Hunt"	Kyler Spears	Todd McClintock	Drew Applegate & Nate Maurer	August 22, 2020	0.44
27	7	"The Plantars Check In"	Joe Johnston	Michele Cavin	Eleisiya Arocha & Silver Paul	August 22, 2020	0.44
Marcy picks up on a "puzzlegram", a telegram composed of puzzles from the king. Anne attempts to show Sprig that she is smart by solving them, but Marcy figures them out better. Instead, Anne ends up helping and befriending various citizens all over Newtopia. Eventually, Anne's actions get the group in trouble, but they are saved by the people Anne helped. Anne admits that she is jealous of Marcy's intelligence, but Marcy admits that Anne has better social skills and they make up. Anne figures out the last clue, which reveals that the message is "Bring Me the Plantars" and go meet the king. King Andrias, a giant and jovial salamander, wants to help Anne and Marcy return home, but it requires more research. He gives the Plantars his gold credit card and they stay in a lavish hotel. A restless Sprig decides to venture around while his family is asleep and enjoys all the perks. He runs afoul of a restless bellhop named Bella who steals his card to pay her debts, but he ends up rescuing her from a fall off the hotel Ferris wheel. Just as she is about to be fired, Sprig comes to her defense and demands she get a raise. Sprig becomes tired while the family wants to go out now.
28	8	"Lost in Newtopia"	Jenn Strickland	Jenava Mie	Anna O'Brian & Eddie West	August 29, 2020	0.29
28	8	"Sprig Gets Schooled"	Kyler Spears	Gloria Shen	Inbal Breda & Cassie Zwart	August 29, 2020	0.29
Anne and Polly break away from a tour group so that they can experience the inner streets of Newtopia for themselves by pretending to be sick while Hop Pop keeps Sprig handcuffed to him so that he, ironically, does not cause any trouble. Anne and Polly traverse the streets only to cause trouble wherever they go. Eventually, a mob chases them back to the tour bus and they use a spicy burrito to deter the crowd and continue on their way to the cheese museum. Meanwhile, Marcy and King Andrias are doing research when Marcy discovers a secret library while Andrias follows her smugly. The family comes across Newtopia University. They walk on the campus where Sprig shows off his knowledge of a certain subject to a professor. Impressed, he is offered a spot at the university which he reluctantly accepts at the urging of Hop Pop. Sprig quickly becomes overwhelmed by the studies; Hop Pop begins to miss Sprig while Anne and Polly try to sneak in so that they can join a crazy college party. Sprig tries to leave, releasing the weevils and Hop Pop tries to rescue him. The professor reveals that Sprig can leave whenever he wants, and he and Hop Pop come to an understanding.
29	9	"Little Frogtown"	Joe Johnston	Adam Colás	Drew Applegate & Nate Maurer	September 12, 2020	0.36
29	9	"Hopping Mall"	Jenn Strickland	Todd McClintock	Eleisiya Arocha & Silver Paul	September 12, 2020	0.36
While the kids wait in line at an arcade, Hop Pop goes to meet Sal, who runs a sandwich shop. He arrives to see that the place looks ransacked and, donning a hat, begins to act as if he is in a detective noir. Hop Pop is convinced that someone had stolen Sal's sauce recipe and is now selling it. After various mishaps, he locates the source in a factory, only to find that Sal is the one selling the sauce. He admits that the sandwich business was not doing well, so he mass-produced the sauce instead. He tells Hop Pop to embrace change and he returns to the kids who failed to get into the arcade. The family is in the shopping district of Newtopia where Anne decides to buy a special gift for her mother. She spots a special butterfly teapot and wants to buy it, but encounters a large newt named Priscilla the Killa and her minute daughter Pearl. Anne must enter a Smash n' Mash shopping cart competition and she and Sprig enter with them ultimately becoming victorious. Anne learns the pot was made by Priscilla's mother Penny and she gives it to her while Pearl gives her a butterfly trinket in return. Later at night, Anne tells Sprig she misses her mother while he cannot remember his, and the two of them bond.
30	10	"The Sleepover to End All Sleepovers"	Kyler Spears	Michele Cavin	Alexandria Kwan & Eddie West	September 19, 2020	0.45
30	10	"A Day at the Aquarium"	Joe Johnston	Gloria Shen	Inbal Breda & Cassie Zwart	September 19, 2020	0.45
Marcy invites Anne, Sprig, and Polly for a sleepover and is warned by Lady Olivia to not go into the basement. They decide to do a scare dare challenge with whoever chickens out has to have their name put in the Book of Losers. In the basement, they encounter strange jellyfish ghost-like creatures and see other numerous oddities. They use mirrors to deter the ghosts and stay up all night long. In the morning, all four put their names in the Book of Losers with Anne and Marcy having put their names in numerous times and agreeing to make amends with Sasha. Lady Olivia calls them to Andrias. Andrias informs the group that the gems on the music box must be charged for Anne and Marcy to return home. Marcy informs Anne that she should stay in Newtopia and she decides to go to the aquarium with the Plantars. Despite their effort to remain happy, they find things that remind them of their previous adventures. After an incident with a stingray, Anne and the Plantars have one last goodbye before they separate. However, Marcy sees that Anne misses the Plantars and tells her to go back to Wartwood with them, much to her relief. Andrias offers a proposition to Marcy.
31	11	"Night Drivers"	Jenn Strickland	Jenava Mie	Drew Applegate & Nate Maurer	March 6, 2021	0.41
31	11	"Return to Wartwood"	Kyler Spears	Adam Colás	Eleisiya Arocha & Silver Paul	March 6, 2021	0.41
Wanting to be home quicker, Sprig and Polly decide to drive the fwagon in the night while Anne and Hop Pop sleep. They come across a terrifying hitchhiker and try to avoid him but he continues to appear and manages to get on the fwagon. As morning rises, the hitchhiker disappears and Sprig and Polly discover a statue of him, who turned out to be the ghost of a helpful guide named Zechariah Nettles. Anne and Hop Pop wake up and find the two frog kids in a tired daze. While at first angry, they let them sleep so that they can drive the rest of the way home. Down the road, the robot continues to follow them. Anne and the Plantars return to Wartwood with a warm welcome. However, Hop Pop and Polly realize that they forgot to bring gifts back for the citizens and convince Anne and Sprig to help fake an attack by summoning a Chicka-lisk to burn a stack of fake presents. The ploy works, but soon Anne and the Plantars team up with the rest of Wartwood to defeat the Chicka-lisk who flees. Anne convinces the Plantars to come clean and while the citizens of Wartwood are upset, they admit that they are glad to see the Plantars be themselves again and Ivy asks Sprig out on a date.
32	12	"The Shut-In!"	Joe Johnston & Jenn Strickland	Todd McClintock & Michele Cavin	Alexandria Kwan, Eddie West, Inbal Breda & Cassie Zwart	October 17, 2020 (Note: This episode was aired out of sequence in order to coincide with Halloween.)	0.28
In this Halloween special, the Plantars stay inside during a blue moon so they won't turn into beasts. To pass the time, they tell spooky stories.: "Phone-Mo": Anne, renamed Anna, is told about an animal video by her friends that traps people within the video's dimension. She watches it and finds that her friends are trapped in it. The Screen Fiend comes out of the video as a monster to take her. Finding that it is weak against harsh criticism, Anna dislikes the video, defeats the monster, and saves her friends, but monster eggs are left behind.; "Dead End": A young Hop Pop works as a wagon driver picking up his next customer Mr. Littlepot. After a few stops, Hop Pop realizes that Littlepot is death personified and the next stop is at his farm. However, instead of Hop Pop, Littlepot takes his hair to cover his baldness and leaves while Hop Pop cries over the loss of his long and luxurious hair.; "Skin Deep": Sprig and Ivy are playing bugball until they lose the ball and go looking for it. They find the ball in an old house that belongs to a skin-wearing monster called the Seamstress. Sprig rips her mask off, revealing her to be a glass frog who uses her skin cloth to cover herself. Sprig and Ivy beat the monster and escape.; After Sprig and Ivy prank the family, Polly, wanting a spooky story to tell since most of her stories were all experiences the family had, looks at the blue moon to turn into a beast. Nothing happens at first and the blue moon legend appears to be false. That is until Polly turns into a wolf-beast, which freaks out the Plantars. Note: This episode is non-canonical.
33	13	"Ivy on the Run"	Joe Johnston	Gloria Shen	Eleisiya Arocha & Silver Paul	March 13, 2021	0.32
33	13	"After the Rain"	Kyler Spears	Jenava Mie	Drew Applegate & Nate Maurer	March 13, 2021	0.32
Ivy is trying to hang out with Sprig, but Felicia is constantly making her do her chores in such a specific and perfect manner. Fed up with Felicia's overbearingness, she decides to run away, something Sprig tries to dissuade her from. They run into Anne and Polly, who were training in Muay Thai. Felicia catches up with Ivy, and agrees to end the tea lessons if she can defeat her once in a three-round match, where Felicia reveals herself as a competent fighter. By letting Ivy win, Felicia reveals that she has been training her for the day that they eventually adventure together, and the two reconcile. Anne and the Plantars get a message from Marcy saying she is coming and to be prepared. Hop Pop goes looking for the Calamity Box and Anne catches him and learns that he tried to hide it. Upset, she runs away with Hop Pop chasing her. Sprig and Polly try looking for the Calamity Box and realize that it was taken by Magpie Beetles and are in the middle of a "love-nado dance". Sprig and Polly get in trouble and Anne and Hop Pop rescue them. Hop Pop admits his wrongdoing and reveals the fate of Sprig and Polly's parents. Anne forgives him and the Plantars promise to help her.
34	14	"The First Temple"	Jenn Strickland & Kyler Spears	Adam Colás & Todd McClintock	Danny Ducker, Alexandria Kwan, Eddie West, Inbal Breda & Cassie Zwart	March 20, 2021	0.34
Marcy meets with Anne and the Plantars and heads to the first temple which is composed of a series of various puzzles and games they need to solve. Marcy continues to get "lost in the zone" and disregards the danger she is putting her friends through. Meanwhile, Hop Pop and Anne continue to have awkward moments due to the events of the previous episode resulting in the two of them getting into an argument. They next play flip wart, a chess-like game with Anne and the Plantars as pieces and Marcy controlling them. Anne finally tells Hop Pop that she simply wants time to herself and he concedes. Marcy forfeits when she cannot prevent danger from harming her friends. However, this ends up being the test and they recharge the green gem on the box. In Newtopia, Andrias learns of their success and reports it to his master, a multi-eyed being.
35	15	"New Wartwood"	Joe Johnston	Michele Cavin	Drew Applegate & Nate Maurer	March 27, 2021	0.34
35	15	"Friend or Frobo?"	Jenn Strickland	Jenava Mie	Eleisiya Arocha & Silver Paul	March 27, 2021	0.34
Marcy is disappointed to learn that the people of Wartwood do not like her. Despite Anne telling her that it will take time, Marcy decides to "fix" things in their town which makes them happy, but they still do not like her. Mayor Toadstool offers some ideas to improve the town, but the heavy load causes Wartwood to sink into the swamp it was built on top of. Marcy gets rid of the excess and saves the town. Everyone scolds Marcy for being inconsiderate, but they tell her that she was just like Anne when she first came to Wartwood. Marcy makes it up by building the town as it was originally. Polly gets very bored when everyone is doing something else and encounters the robot that was following them the whole time. She names it Frobo and proceeds to teach it to do mischievous things with her. However, Frobo ends up causing serious damage and the citizens attack him. Believing that Polly is in danger, Frobo becomes violent and fights back. Ultimately, Polly talks Frobo down and admits that she was being irresponsible with him and he settles. Hop Pop decides to adopt Frobo when he learns that he can do various other helpful tasks like gardening.
36	16	"Toad to Redemption"	Kyler Spears	Gloria Shen	Danny Ducker & Eddie West	April 3, 2021	0.25
36	16	"Maddie & Marcy"	Joe Johnston	Adam Colás	Inbal Breda & Cassie Zwart	April 3, 2021	0.25
Mayor Toadstool begins to like being helpful to the people of Wartwood, but is approached by Newtopia emissary Jacinda who offers him to lead South Toad Tower and adds that turning it down will result in his imprisonment. With Anne and the Plantars' help, he tries to look incompetent, but to no avail. Bog and the rest of the Grime's former Toad warriors attack Wartwood, but Toadstool defends the town and saves the day. Instead, Jacinda decides to make Bog the new leader after deeming Toadstool as "too soft" and he is allowed to stay in Wartwood much to everyone's casual acceptance. While trying to perfect a spell, Maddie gets pestered by her younger sisters, Rosemary, Lavender, and Ginger, who want to play with her. Instead, she forms a closeness with Marcy who wants to help complete her spell. The triplets become jealous and, based on a comment made by Maddie, decide to grow up using one of her spells. The triplets proceed to grow continuously and Maddie realizes that it is her fault for neglecting them. With Marcy's help, she uses another spell to shrink her sisters back down and promises to be more caring to them.
37	17	"The Second Temple"	Jenn Strickland	Todd McClintock	Drew Applegate & Nate Maurer	April 10, 2021	0.37
37	17	"Barrel's Warhammer"	Kyler Spears	Michele Cavin	Eleisiya Arocha & Silver Paul	April 10, 2021	0.37
Anne, Marcy and the Plantars arrive in a frozen tundra where they run into Valeriana who claims that she can take them to the second temple. However, she continuously belittles Anne due to her selfless acts to help her friends. After insulting her, Valeriana takes Anne to a spire and recalls her misdeeds. Once again, Anne acts selfless and Valeriana reveals that it was all a test and rewards her with recharging the blue gem on the box. However, Anne leaves before it can finish charging when she believes her friends are in danger. Upon heading home, the blue gem begins to flicker. Sasha, Grime, Percy, and Braddock arrive at the Toad summit to pitch their idea of taking over Newtopia and Amphibia. Everyone likes the idea but does not want Grime to lead. Sasha impulsively takes the challenge of acquiring Barrel's Warhammer to prove their worth. Despite Percy and Braddock saying they should quit if things got too dangerous, Sasha ignores their pleas and together they face a giant worm to get the hammer back and to prove that she can make it without Anne or Marcy. They are successful, but Percy and Braddock leave, unwilling to work with Sasha.
38	18	"Bessie & MicroAngelo"	Joe Johnston	Jenava Mie	Danny Ducker & Eddie West	April 17, 2021	0.35
38	18	"The Third Temple"	Jenn Strickland	Gloria Shen	Inbal Breda & Cassie Zwart	April 17, 2021	0.35
While Anne, Marcy and the Plantars pack for the last temple, Bessie is placed in charge of looking after MicroAngelo who continuously gets into trouble. Meanwhile, Marcy hires a fashion expert from Newtopia named Bernardo to find the perfect armor for Anne. After a series of mishaps, Bessie rescues MicroAngelo from a giant bat creature while simultaneously putting out a fire that was almost going to blow everyone up. Anne eventually settles on a "minimalist" armor chest plate so that she can see herself, while Bessie and MicroAngelo form a close bond with each other. Anne, Marcy, and the Plantars arrive at the third temple located inside of a volcano. Upon entering, they run into Sasha and Grime who claim that they have changed their ways and want to help. Anne continues to doubt Sasha's motivations until they reach the final room where they must face a stone monster. Anne admits that it is not just now, but their entire friendship that bothers her, but encourages Sasha to defeat it while also charging the pink gem on the Calamity Box. After exiting the cave, Grime reminds Sasha of their true plan, and she starts to feel conflicted.
39	19	"The Dinner"	Kyler Spears	Adam Colás	Drew Applegate & Nate Maurer	April 24, 2021	0.37
39	19	"Battle of the Bands"	Joe Johnston	Todd McClintock	Eleisiya Arocha, Silver Paul & Cassie Zwart	April 24, 2021	0.37
Anne, Marcy and the Plantars invite Sasha and Grime over for dinner to bury the hatchet. While things are calm at first, everyone starts bringing up past conflicts. Unable to contain herself, Sasha lashes out at Anne and Marcy for trying to change her. A cake Grime brought turns into a deadly challenge that forces the girls to save everyone. Afterwards, Anne tells Sasha that while she knows it is difficult for her to change, she needs to accept that she and Marcy have done, then Sasha apologizes. To ease Sasha and Grime's presence, Toadstool holds a battle of the bands contest and the girls get together to reform their band. However, Sasha shows her controlling nature when Anne suggests a new song and she leaves in a huff where she teams up with Toadie, who shows her that always being in control is exhausting and she needs to support her friends. At the contest, Sasha reforms with Anne and Marcy to perform the new song, but Grime wins with his three-hour harp solo. Anne bids farewell to Wartwood and takes a photo with everyone.
40	20	"True Colors"	Jenn Strickland & Kyler Spears	Michele Cavin & Jenava Mie	Danny Ducker, Eddie West, Joe Johnston, Inbal Breda, & Silver Paul	May 22, 2021 (Note: This episode was scheduled to premiere on May 1, 2021. However, it was delayed due to scheduling shifts. It was released accidentally on iTunes on the day after the scheduled premiere, but was taken down later.)	0.33
In a flashback, Marcy is upset when her parents announce they are moving and inspired by a book, discovers the Calamity Box, and suggests getting it for Anne for her birthday. In the present, the girls, the Plantars, and Grime arrive at Newtopia, but Sasha and Grime unveil their plan to take over the kingdom. Upset that she was betrayed by her friend again, Anne rallies everyone to take back the kingdom, during which Sasha and Grime discover that Andrias has sinister motivations. They are successful, but Andrias reveals that he intends to conquer other worlds using the box and Marcy admits to knowledge of the box's power. A fight breaks out, during which Frobo is destroyed, to Polly's devastation. Polly grows legs and takes back the music box, but is forced to return by Andrias after he threatens to drop Sprig out of the tower. However, Andrias decides to drop Sprig anyways, with Marcy saving him. Anne unleashes her inert blue gem power. Marcy opens the portal home but is stabbed by Andrias just as Anne and the Plantars enter the portal and arrive in Los Angeles. Note: This episode contains a content warning of scenes possibly too intense for children (specifically that of Andrias stabbing Marcy), as well as a post-credits scene featuring the intro for the third season.

=== Season 3 (2021–22) ===
No. overall	No. in season	Title	Directed by	Written by	Storyboarded by	Original release date	Prod. code	U.S. viewers (millions)
41	1	"The New Normal"	Joe Johnston & Jenn Strickland	Todd McClintock & Adam Colás	Silver Paul, Alex Swanson, Drew Applegate & Eddie West	October 2, 2021	301	0.43
Anne and the Plantars arrive in Los Angeles and head directly to the former's house. Mr. and Mrs. Boonchuy are relieved, yet shocked at the recent events from the past five months. They also notice that Anne has matured significantly and allow her to bring the disguised Plantars to the market with them. While keeping Marcy in stasis to recuperate, Andrias sends the Cloak-Bot to Earth to find Anne and kill her. At the market, the Cloak-Bot uses its cloaking ability to attack Anne and the Plantars, but they fight back discreetly. With the Plantars in danger, Anne unleashes her blue gem energy, damaging the Cloak-Bot as it flees. Afterward, Mr. and Mrs. Boonchuy commend Anne for her maturity. As the family leaves the store, Anne decides not to use her powers anymore. At a different location, the Cloak-Bot repairs itself and plots to kill Anne.
42	2	"Hop 'Til You Drop"	Roxann Cole & Kyler Spears	Gloria Shen	Eleisiya Arocha & Danny Ducker	October 9, 2021	302	0.32
42	2	"Turning Point"	Joe Johnston	Jenava Mie	Inbal Breda & Cassie Zwart	October 9, 2021	302	0.32
Realizing that the Plantars cannot restrain themselves in her world, Anne takes them to the mall and challenges Polly to not lose her temper, Sprig to not touch anything, and Hop Pop to not fall for "free" things. Anne gets distracted by her talkative friend Gabby, resulting in the Plantars getting in trouble. Anne rescues them and apologizes for throwing them into the world without planning as they had done for her, but the Plantars point out that she made the same mistakes in Amphibia. Nevertheless, they promise to be more compliant and listen to her when she warns them. Immediately after Anne and the Plantars disappear to Earth, Sasha and Grime escape King Andrias and seek refuge in Wartwood. They convince the townsfolk that Anne asked Sasha to protect the town, but she feels guilty about her actions. When a drone arrives and requests reinforcements, Grime plans to flee, but Sasha remains in the town, where she finds Anne's journal and realizes that their friendship truly mattered. Seeking redemption, Sasha tells the people of Wartwood the truth and they join her and Grime in defeating the arriving drones. Empowered, Sasha plans to fight back.
43	3	"Thai Feud"	Jenn Strickland	Michele Cavin	Silver Paul & Alex Swanson	October 16, 2021	303	0.36
43	3	"Adventures in Catsitting"	Roxann Cole & Kyler Spears	Todd McClintock	Drew Applegate & Eddie West	October 16, 2021	303	0.36
Wanting to be accepted as a Boonchuy as Anne had been accepted as a Plantar, Sprig joins them to work at their restaurant Thai Go. Their biggest customer Ned does not realize that his dream to expand their business by opening a food truck is hurting it, so Sprig tries to sabotage him. He ends up making things worse and he and Anne find themselves trying to maneuver Ned's out-of-control food truck. Sprig takes responsibility for the events which convinces Ned to cease his dream but gets hired as a delivery boy. Mrs. Boonchuy scolds Sprig which ironically makes him happy as this means he is a Boonchuy now. With Mr. Boonchuy going to work and Mrs. Boonchuy taking Anne to the dentist, the Plantars offer to take Domino the cat to the vet for a vaccine, as they do not want to be seen as freeloaders. Despite several mishaps along the way, they manage to get to the vet. When they hurriedly leave, Domino escapes and Sprig calls Mr. Boonchuy for help. They find Domino at a shawarma restaurant and rescue her. Hop Pop feels guilty, but Mr. Boonchuy reassures him that the Plantars do not owe them anything, as they took care of Anne during her time in Amphibia. Meanwhile, Mrs. Boonchuy brings a loopy Anne back from the dentist.
44	4	"Fight at the Museum"	Joe Johnston	Adam Colás	Eleisiya Arocha & Danny Ducker	October 23, 2021	304	0.39
44	4	"Temple Frogs"	Jenn Strickland	Gloria Shen	Inbal Breda & Cassie Zwart	October 23, 2021	304	0.39
Obsessed with studying the multiverse, Anne and the Plantars head to the museum and find an ancient jar of Amphibian origin. They meet the curator Dr. Jan who offers to talk about it, but a sleep-deprived Anne, dealing with trust issues, turns her down. They resolve to steal the jar at night and end up running into the Cloak-Bot where a fight breaks out. Dr. Jan and a couple of security guards spot the Cloak-Bot, forcing it to flee. Despite seeing the Plantars, Dr. Jan protects them and learns the jar's importance. She tells Anne to get some sleep and in the morning, she discovers a hidden message using a black light. Anne gets a message from Dr. Jan, but is told by her parents that they will go to the Thai Temple and ask her to stay for at least an hour. As the Plantars enjoy their stay there. Anne gets caught trying to leave and Mrs. Boonchuy reveals that she was returning dishes to the neighbors who were comforting her during her disappearance. Drones dispatched by the Cloak-Bot attack the temple, but the whole community pitches in to help fight them off and see the Plantars' true appearance, but they do not mind. Dr. Jan arrives with the jar and a message about the "Mother of Olms", but none of them know what it means.
45	5	"Fixing Frobo"	Roxann Cole & Kyler Spears	Jenava Mie	Silver Paul & Alex Swanson	October 30, 2021	305	0.33
45	5	"Anne-sterminator"	Joe Johnston	Michele Cavin	Drew Applegate & Eddie West	October 30, 2021	305	0.33
Despite being told not to, Polly tries to fix Frobo on her own and gets help from an internet duo named Ally and Jess (The IT Gals). She chats with them online and they give her the help she needs, but are concerned with her plans. When Anne, Hop Pop, and Sprig find out what she is doing and reprimand her for it, Polly angrily activates Frobo, which flies out of the garage and puts herself in danger. Frobo remembers who he is and saves Polly, but they crash land in the backyard and he is reduced to a head again, though he is still active. Ally and Jess arrive and are impressed with Polly's skills so they decided to help her fix Frobo. Anne realizes that she needs to tell her parents the truth about what is happening. Meanwhile, King Andrias gives Cloak-Bot one hour to find her or the timer he activated will set off his self-destruct sequence. Cloak-Bot attacks the Boonchuys and Plantars who escape to a junkyard. During this time, Anne realizes that her mother had high expectations for her and she in turn is angered at her for lying. Anne tells her parents that she lied to protect them and the Plantars. They work together to defeat the Cloak-Bot, with Anne sending it out of earth before it explodes. They drive home on good terms. Meanwhile, FBI agents view footage of Anne and the Plantars.
46	6	"Mr. X"	Roxann Cole & Kyler Spears	Adam Colás	Inbal Breda & Cassie Zwart	November 6, 2021	306	0.39
46	6	"Sprig's Birthday"	Jenn Strickland	Todd McClintock	Eleisiya Arocha & Danny Ducker	November 6, 2021	306	0.39
As Anne takes the Plantars to the movies, the enigmatic Mr. X begins to snoop around for them. Mr. and Mrs. Boonchuy quickly discover this when he comes asking around for them and tries to warn Anne. When Mr. X has every corner of the cinema covered, Anne and the Plantars hastily try to run and hide from them. Mr. and Mrs. Boonchuy offer help to Anne who continues to refuse it. Eventually, the parents manage to rescue them and Anne admits that she underestimated them. Mr. X vows to catch the Plantars next time. The Boonchuys reveal that they planted a tracker onto Hop Pop. Anne discovers that it is Sprig's eleventh birthday and is shocked that he never told her. She decides to give him the best birthday ever as they travel around Los Angeles. When Sprig says that this birthday is in the "top 3", Anne angrily suggests going on a balloon ride. Despite the warning of heavy winds, Anne and Sprig take off in a Pennywise-resembling balloon and end up flying out of control around the city. They manage to land safely and Sprig tells Anne that he does not care that she did not know it was his birthday and that he just wanted to spend time with her. They return home with their friendship renewed.
47	7	"Spider-Sprig"	Joe Johnston	Gloria Shen	Rachel Paek, Silver Paul, Kyler Spears & Alex Swanson	November 13, 2021	307	0.35
47	7	"Olivia & Yunan"	Jenn Strickland	Jenava Mie	Drew Applegate & Eddie West	November 13, 2021	307	0.35
After watching a superhero movie called Tarantu-Lad, Sprig decides to use his abilities to become the superhero Frog-Man. His actions earned him the ire of junkyard owner/self-proclaimed "neighborhood safety supervisor" Robert Otto, but the admiration of the people of Los Angeles including Robert's granddaughter Molly Jo. Robert discovers Cloak-Bot's arm in his junkyard and becomes a villain to get revenge on Sprig. Their battle destroys the streets and Molly Jo chastises them. Realizing that he was simply seeking attention, Sprig, and Robert clean the city. Afterward, Sprig gives up being a hero. Lady Olivia and General Yunan decide to rescue Marcy from her stasis so that they can create a plan to end Andrias's tyranny. The pair traverse the castle's many passages, facing creatures that are held by Andrias, before managing to find and revive Marcy. However, the three soon become trapped in a hologram that preys on their worst fears, so they overcome the illusions by destroying the source. Just before they can leave, Andrias appears and reveals his plan to use Marcy as a host for his multi-eyed master "The Core" which is a digital amalgamation of Amphibia's greatest minds. The Core transfers itself into Marcy's body, taking her over by the name Darcy.
48	8	"Hollywood Hop Pop"	Roxann Cole & Kyler Spears	Michele Cavin	Eleisiya Arocha & Danny Ducker	November 20, 2021	308	0.31
48	8	"If You Give a Frog a Cookie"	Joe Johnston	Todd McClintock	Cheyenne Curtis & Cassie Zwart	November 20, 2021	308	0.31
Upon arriving in Hollywood, Hop Pop finds himself auditioning for a commercial and gets the part, despite another man named Humphrey Westwood giving up his chance for it. The commercial becomes a hit which gets the attention of Mr. X. After getting offered a big part in a movie, Hop Pop takes off with Mr. X in pursuit and Anne, Sprig, and Polly also after him. However, Hop Pop learns that Humphrey is a janitor who has been waiting for his big break and gives up his role to him. Mr. X is humiliated once again and Hop Pop returns home with the intent to pursue a career in directing instead. Dr. Jan tells Anne about Dr. Frakes, a scientist who could potentially help them. Jan says to wait until they know they can trust Frakes, but Anne, guilted by the homesick Plantars, goes to see her immediately. Frakes reveals that she has built a machine that can create portals to other universes, but the Plantars cannot find Amphibia through it. When Frakes discovers that the Plantars are frogs, she kidnaps them. With the aid of Frakes' assistant Terri, Anne rescues them. Afterward, the Plantars apologize for guilting Anne. Having been fired by Frakes, Terri decides to help them build their portal.
49	9	"Froggy Little Christmas"	Jenn Strickland, Roxann Cole & Kyler Spears	Adam Colás & Jenava Mie	Silver Paul, Alex Swanson, Drew Applegate & Eddie West	November 27, 2021	309	0.42
The Boonchuys prepare for Christmas while the Plantars are trying to wrap their heads around it. Mrs. Boonchuy turns down her dream of entering a float in the annual Christmas parade due to costs, but Anne and the Plantars recruit the IT Gals and Dr. Jan to help make one. Meanwhile, Andrias sends a remote control drone to Earth to find and kill Anne. With the float complete, the Boonchuys, Plantars, and IT Gals enter the parade. Andrias finally finds Anne and takes over a Santa Claus float, but they manage to defeat it. Despite the incident, everyone is happy with how things turned out. Darcy (the Core's possessed form of Marcy) mocks Andrias for his failure, but he is confident that his new army will be insuperable. Later, Anne writes anonymous letters to the Wu and Waybright families, promising to bring their daughters back.
50	10	"Escape to Amphibia"	Joe Johnston & Jenn Strickland	Gloria Shen & Michele Cavin	Eleisiya Arocha, Danny Ducker, Cassie Zwart & Anna Lencioni	March 19, 2022	310	0.24
Terri and Dr. Jan almost get the portal back to Amphibia up and running, but do not have enough power to make it big enough. The Boonchuys and Plantars go shopping for supplies and Anne reveals to Sprig that she is unsure if she can leave her parents again. Mr. X and the FBI arrive and kidnap the Plantars forcing the Boonchuys to recruit their friends to rescue them. The group is captured and Anne feels helpless until her parents tell her that she has grown and achieved much during this time and have faith in her. Anne then deals with the FBI and the rescue is successful, but the portal still does not work and Mr. X has them cornered. Anne unleashes her energy which is enough to get the portal open and she and the Plantars escape. As the Boonchuys confront Mr. X, Anne and the Plantars return to the devastated wasteland that was once known as Amphibia.
51	11	"Commander Anne"	Roxann Cole	Todd McClintock	Silver Paul & Alex Swanson	March 26, 2022	311	0.28
51	11	"Sprivy"	Joe Johnston	Adam Colás	Drew Applegate & Eddie West	March 26, 2022	311	0.28
Anne and the Plantars discover that Wartwood has become the home base for the resistance with Sasha leading them. However, Sasha decides to hand command over to Anne despite her reluctance. Anne turns out to be terrible at leading, especially when they have to take down one of King Andrias' factories. Sasha finally admits that she is afraid of ruining everything as she did with their friendship. Anne puts herself in harm's way so that Sasha can regain her confidence and rescue everyone from a giant snake. Anne hands command back over to Sasha but agree to co-lead with her to make her comfortable. Sprig and Ivy are spending every moment of their time together. Sasha sends Sprig and Ivy on a mission to destroy Andrias' cannons with Stumpy and Fern for their supplier to get through but wants them to pair off differently. Sprig and Ivy forge a letter so that they can stay paired up with each other. However, this makes the mission more difficult for Stumpy and Fern, and Sprig and Ivy decide to temporarily separate so they can make things right. Sasha scolds them for nearly destroying the mission. Sprig and Ivy agree that while they still love each other, they need to be more cautious with their relationship.
52	12	"Sasha's Angels"	Jenn Strickland	Jenava Mie	Eleisiya Arocha & Danny Ducker	April 2, 2022	312	0.29
52	12	"Olm Town Road"	Roxann Cole	Gloria Shen	Inbal Breda & Cassie Zwart	April 2, 2022	312	0.29
Sasha puts together a team to help take down a Marauders camp, their leader being Barry. They get ambushed; getting everyone captured, sans Sasha and Anne who wait and spar with each other. Toadie has trouble breaking out of his comfort zone and botches a plan to escape which results in Mrs. Croaker getting knocked out. After being pushed too far, Toadie finally leads the team to break out, destroying the camp and getting their supplies back. Sasha tells Anne that she does care about the Wartwood citizens and that she needs to trust her judgment even when she makes difficult decisions. Using the information they gathered on Earth, Anne, Sasha, and the Plantars go looking for the Mother of Olms and find Lysil and Angwin; demanding that they take them to her. Lysil and Angwin turn out to be banned from Proteus, the city of olms, who are in denial of the tremors being from Andrias' drilling machines and get kicked out. The heroes manage to take down the drills, but when Parisia, the leader, refuses to acknowledge this, Sasha snaps back at her. Impressed with her determination, Parisia allows Lysil and Angwin into the city again and gives them access to the Mother of Olms.
53	13	"Mother of Olms"	Joe Johnston	Michele Cavin	Silver Paul & Alex Swanson	April 9, 2022	313	0.28
53	13	"Grime's Pupil"	Jenn Strickland	Adam Colás	Drew Applegate & Eddie West	April 9, 2022	313	0.28
Anne, Sasha, and the Plantars meet Mother Olm who has information on the prophecy, but cannot remember. The kids go into her head to rub cream on her brain while Hop Pop waits outside with Mother Olm who gives him encouraging advice on being old. The kids are attacked by batsquitos and get trapped in the nose. Hop Pop gets Mother Olm to sneeze them out, but she still cannot remember. Luckily, she wrote down the prophecy which says that "three stars" will burn brightly, implying that Sasha and Marcy also have superpowers similar to Anne and will help them regain them. Sasha tries to get the other toads to join their cause, but the bickering between Grime and Sprig results in Captain Beatrix challenging Sprig to a duel after hearing that he defeated Grime. Grime is forced to train Sprig and while the two start as enemies, the two of them begin to acknowledge the other's prowess and train for real. Sprig faces Beatrix in a cage match and, using what Grime taught him, manages to defeat her much to everyone's delight. Beatrix admits defeat and states that her toads will be of service to the resistance in their fight against Andrias.
54	14	"The Root of Evil"	Joe Johnston	Jenava Mie	Inbal Breda & Cassie Zwart	April 16, 2022	314	0.24
54	14	"The Core & The King"	Roxann Cole	Todd McClintock	Eleisiya Arocha & Danny Ducker	April 16, 2022	314	0.24
Anne, Loggle, and the Plantars find themselves in a village called Gardenton where all the residents love horticulture, much to Hop Pop's delight. However, they discover too late that their leader is their old enemy Apothecary Gary, now using Jeremy the Beetle as his host, and with the villagers willingly under his control. Gardenton is attacked by Andrias' forces and the heroes save the village. Hop Pop convinces Gary that they have a lot in common and gets him to help fight alongside the resistance while also revealing that there may be another fungal creature like him. In a flashback, King Andrias recalls his friendship with the frog Leif and the toad Barrel and the pressure he faced under his father King Aldrich. When Leif has a vision of Amphibia's destruction, her warning comes as a threat; forcing her to take the music box and flee. His friendship with Leif and Barrel forever ruined, continues to haunt Andrias. In the present, after erasing Marcy's "redundant" memories, the Core tells Andrias that they are close to invading Earth while some of its personality is revealed to contain that of King Aldrich as Darcy starts to talk in his voice.
55	15	"Newts in Tights"	Jenn Strickland	Gloria Shen	Silver Paul & Alex Swanson	April 23, 2022	315	0.30
55	15	"Fight or Flight"	Roxann Cole	Michele Cavin	Drew Applegate & Eddie West	April 23, 2022	315	0.30
As some toads and newts are working for Andrias, Anne and Sprig are reunited with Tritonio who leads a band of neutral thieves who steal from Andrias, but are unaligned with the rebellion. When his team is captured, he bails on them due to his harsh upbringing on the streets. Words of encouragement lead him to change his mind and he rescues his thieves from a judge-themed Frobot and joins the rebellion. Back at base, the group finds a hidden room that contains a red envelope with no writing. While disappointed, Sprig takes extra precaution and pockets the letter before leaving. While on a scouting mission with Sprig, Loggle, and Soggy Joe, Anne reunites with Domino II who has had "kittens". Domino II is captured by drones to help power a battery, Anne and Sprig go and rescue her while the rest of Wartwood reluctantly look after the kittens, though they end up falling in love with them. With Sprig’s assistance, Anne found Domino 2 and destroys the collar in which it was attached to a rope. Anne discovers that Domino II remembers her, but when the other Kill-a-moths try to eat Sprig who is trying to save them, Anne learns that Domino II is the Alpha Moth and she alerts the other moths to leave them alone. Anne and Sprig liberate the moths and they all fly back to Wartwood where Sasha dubs them their new flying artillery.
56	16	"The Three Armies"	Joe Johnston	Todd McClintock	Eleisiya Arocha & Danny Ducker	April 30, 2022	316	0.25
56	16	"The Beginning of the End"	Jenn Strickland	Adam Colás	Inbal Breda, Anna Lencioni & Cassie Zwart	April 30, 2022	316	0.25
Anne is shocked to learn that the frogs, newts, and toads do not get along, despite her hard work of getting them to fight against Andrias. She has Beatrix, leading the toads, and Tritonio, leading the newts, come and work with the frogs via team-building exercises, but these all end in disaster. Fed up with everyone, Anne uses her powers to set everyone straight and the three armies finally formulate a plan. Mother Olm arrives to tell everyone that King Andrias has decided to start his invasion of Earth that very night; leading everyone to prepare for the final battle. Anne and Sasha have a talk over their bad relationship with Marcy and that despite her actions, they feel that they are to blame for her tricking them into sending them to Amphibia. The whole rebellion attacks Andrias' forces while Anne, Sasha, Grime, and the Plantars sneak inside to get the music box. However, they were stopped by a Mind-Controlled Yunan and Olivia who attacked them, But Anne and Sasha fight them and destroy their collars, freeing them. The team fall into a trap by Darcy who plans to kill Anne, but she exploits the fact that they are clueless about the box and they decide to leave her alive. Darcy and Andrias enact their plan as they open a portal to Los Angeles.
57	17	"All In" (Note: This episode runs at a special length of 48 minutes.)	Roxann Cole, Joe Johnston & Jenn Strickland	Jenava Mie, Gloria Shen & Michele Cavin	Hannah Ayoubi, Alex Swanson, Danny Ducker, Eddie West, Inbal Breda & Cassie Zwart	May 7, 2022	317	0.35
As Andrias and Darcy begin their invasion of Earth, Anne and her friends manage to escape. They are reunited with an allied Mr. X and the Boonchuys, who are now trained agents. The heroes split into two teams with the Boonchuys, the Plantars, the U.S. military, and Mr. X challenging the army while Sasha, Grime, Olivia, and Yunan break back into the castle to take out the force field. The Plantars encounter the same herons that broke their family, but when the herons threaten to attack Anne's parents, they tame them and use them to fight Andrias' army. Marcy, held within Darcy's mind, is enticed by her fantasy world by Aldrich, but soon overcomes this when she realizes that her friends would not want this. As Yunan and Olivia battle the Cloak-Bots, Sasha and Grime fight Darcy, resulting in Grime's arm getting cut off. Andrias faces Anne for the fate of her world, but Mr. X translates Sprig's letter and he gets it to Andrias, revealing that it is from Leif, who still cared about him. Darcy plans to finish her plan, but Sasha slices the neural link and frees Marcy. Andrias willingly lets Anne defeat him by destroying his suit, revealing that he is part-cyborg. Inside the castle, Marcy still had some life in her, though the helmet crawls away. The heroes transport the castle back to Amphibia and announce their victory, only to see the red moon heading towards the planet.
58	18	"The Hardest Thing" (Note: This episode runs at a special length of 29 minutes.)	Roxann Cole & Joe Johnston	Adam Colás & Todd McClintock	Drew Applegate, Eleisiya Arocha, Silver Paul & Alex Swanson	May 14, 2022	318	0.35
In a final gambit, the Core flies off and attaches itself to Amphibia's cybernetic moon, rocketing it towards the planet. Mother Olm explains the prophecy was never bound to happen, it was simply a plea for help, and that channeling the full power of the Gems may require the sacrifice of one's life. Valeriana imbues Anne, Sasha, and Marcy with the Gems' power so they can repel the moon, assisted by a repentant Andrias through his drones. When Sasha and Marcy's powers begin to fade, Anne sacrifices herself to destroy the moon and the Core. Anne awakens in a form of purgatory and meets the cosmic deity who created the Gems to see how mortals handled unlimited power in order to find a successor, offering the position to Anne. When Anne declines, feeling she is not ready to handle such responsibility at age 13, the Guardian understands and returns her to life, leaving her with gem shards to facilitate the girls' return to Earth. The girls have a heartfelt goodbye with the Amphibians before departing, and the Box and Gems turn to dust. Nine months later, life in Amphibia has changed for the better, including Polly now being a fully grown frog. After unveiling a statue of Anne in Wartwood, Sprig leaves with Ivy to explore a newly-discovered continent. Ten more years later, Sasha picks up Marcy at LAX before going to the Aquarium of the Pacific where Anne works as a herpetologist to surprise her for her birthday.

== Shorts ==
=== Shorts overview ===
Online shorts	Episodes	Originally released	
Online shorts	Episodes	First released	Last released
Teen Girl in a Frog World	5	September 3, 2019	October 1, 2019
Wild Amphibia	4	November 13, 2019	December 4, 2019
Chibi Tiny Tales	11	June 7, 2020	March 30, 2024
Disney Theme Song Takeover	3	August 14, 2020	September 30, 2021
Vlogs from the Bog	6	September 1, 2021	October 6, 2021
Broken Karaoke	3	May 15, 2022	October 7, 2023
How NOT to Draw	TBA	March 23, 2024	TBA

=== Teen Girl in a Frog World (2019) ===
A series of shorts began airing depicting Anne encountering oddities in Amphibia with the Plantars. All of the shorts were directed by Drew Applegate.

No.	Title	Storyboarded by	Original release date
1	"No Signal"	Drew Applegate	September 3, 2019
Anne can't get a signal for her phone and ponders that she might need to be close to a large antenna. Sprig misunderstands her and retrieves a giant insect with large antennae.
2	"Whack-A-Mole"	Steve Wolfhard	September 10, 2019
Seeing Sprig dealing with a mole digging up the vegetable patch, Anne uses her Whac-A-Mole skills to hit it. This angers the creature, which turns out to be a much larger mole than she realized.
3	"Scenic Route"	Drew Applegate	September 17, 2019
Anne is bored during a snail ride, so Hop Pop suggests taking the scenic route home. While the Plantars are unfazed, Anne is alarmed and injured by the many things they encounter along the journey. By the time they get home, Anne is eager to take the scenic route again.
4	"Hop Popcorn"	Cheyenne Curtis	September 24, 2019
Hop Pop decides to make popcorn for movie night by roasting a giant ear of corn. However, he forgets to cover it, and the giant popcorn destroys most of the house and injures the family.
5	"Cattail Catastrophe"	Drew Applegate	October 1, 2019
With Anne unable to cross a large gap, Sprig suggests using a giant cattail as a catapult. However, the cattail proves too strong and Anne is launched off into the distance. Sprig, thinking it looks fun, launches himself after her.

=== Wild Amphibia (2019) ===
In the style of nature documentaries, Soggy Joe introduces the viewer to a variety of strange creatures in Amphibia. After Soggy Joe is done reviewing each one, he will reveal a fictional promotion that is associated with him.

No.	Title	Original release date
1	"Rhino Beetle"	November 13, 2019
2	"Killer Tomatoes"	November 20, 2019
3	"Kitty"	November 27, 2019
4	"Praying Mantis"	December 4, 2019

=== Chibi Tiny Tales (2020–24) ===
Disney began releasing new shorts titled Chibi Tiny Tales, as a loose follow-up to Big Hero 6: The Series' Big Chibi 6 The Shorts. Unlike Big Chibi 6, the shorts utilize silent comedy and slapstick in a super-deformed style reminiscient of anime. Other serialized Disney productions and Disney Channel films were also animated in this style.

No.	Title	Original release date
1	"Mantis Bowling"	June 7, 2020
Anne teaches Sprig, Hop Pop and Polly how to bowl by rolling a pill bug at baby mantises. The mother mantis soon discovers them and gets revenge by turning them into her own pins.
2	"Quit Bugging Me"	June 14, 2020
Hop Pop is constantly disrupted by Sprig, who is attempting to catch and eat a passing fly. He eventually tricks Sprig into sticking his tongue to a giant ladybug and getting carried away.
3	"Bird Attack"	June 21, 2020
A bird mistakes Sprig's goggles for clovers and attempts to eat Sprig and Anne. Before they can be eaten, a larger bird mistakes the bird's plumage for its own favorite plant and pursues them all.
4	"Bucket Blues"	June 28, 2020
Polly finds a chalice left by Wally and begins using it, making her old bucket jealous. The bucket attempts to win her back to no avail, only to get damaged saving her from a falling boulder. Seeing its selflessness, Polly rejects the chalice and returns to her bucket.
5	"Family Photo"	July 5, 2020
Hop Pop tries to force the kids to take a family photo together, but they are impatient and keep ruining every shot. While attempting to escape, they accidentally break Hop Pop's camera. Feeling guilty, the three assemble a family photo for Hop Pop using pieces from the other photos.
6	"Quicksand"	July 12, 2020
While playing with Sprig, Anne accidentally gets stuck in a quicksand pit. Unable to rescue her, the Plantars say their goodbyes to Anne, and she accepts her fate, only to discover Wally's secret hideaway below, which she easily returns from.
7	"Selfie Safari"	April 17, 2022
Anne takes the Plantars to the zoo. When the Plantars try taking a selfie with a lion, he angrily chases after them, only for it to be revealed that he simply wanted a better selfie with them.
8	"Frogs in Space"	May 8, 2022
While visiting a space museum, the Plantars steal a space shuttle and launch into space. They pass through an asteroid field before encountering alien versions of themselves. They manage to get back to Earth, with Polly having taken an asteroid.
9	"Pirates of the Caribbean x Amphibia"	October 21, 2022
While tinkering with the Calamity Box, Anne and the Plantars are transported to the world of Pirates of the Caribbean and encounter the various characters including Captain Redd. They return home with bountiful treasures.
10	"The Amphibia House"	January 14, 2023
A malfunctioning Calamity Box transports Anne and the Planters from Amphibia to the Owl House, where they meet Luz Noceda. Luz quickly befriends them, taking them on a tour of the Boiling Isles. At one point, Anne and the Planters are swallowed whole by a large demon. However, the Calamity Box suddenly activates, sending them all back to Amphibia.
11	"Back to the Swamp"	March 30, 2024
Luz, Eda, King, and Hooty travel through the portal door to Amphibia where they meet Anne, the Plantars, Sasha, and Marcy. The two groups play games together before sitting down for a campfire. Eventually the portal shrinks and the Boiling Isles crew head home, though King's skull cap falls off in the process.

=== Disney Theme Song Takeover (2020–21) ===
As part of a promotional campaign, Disney Channel began airing the Disney Theme Song Takeover wherein supporting characters from different shows performed the theme song to the series they were in. Unlike previous theme song takeovers, the first Amphibia Takeover video is instead an alternate arrangement instead of a supporting character singing it.

No.	Title	Original release date
1	"8-bit Theme Song Takeover"	August 14, 2020
Anne and Sprig play a new video game on her phone resembling their adventures. Hop Pop later tells them to clean the spiders out of the bathroom to lure them away so he can play the game. Note: The video features pixel art by guest animator Paul Robertson, and an arrangement of the theme by indie chiptune band Hyper Potions.
2	"Sasha Theme Song Takeover"	January 10, 2021
Sasha takes over the theme song to help explain her, in her own opinion, much better backstory to Anne. Even if her theme song is better, Anne believes that she still works as the main character, though Sprig thinks he is the main character of the series because he is the normal frog who saved the human monster (Anne) and then took care of her.
3	"Marcy Theme Song Takeover"	September 30, 2021
Just as Hop Pop and Polly are about to start the theme song, Marcy pops up and decides to do her own rendition of what happened when she arrived in Newtopia; describing numerous unseen side adventures. After she leaves, Hop Pop says "See you later, alligator" and he and Polly are immediately attacked by one.

=== Vlogs from the Bog (2021) ===
A series of shorts featuring Anne showing off the interesting things in Amphibia. Chronologically, these shorts occur during the first season, though in "My Dope Life As A Battle Queen! By: Sasha", Sasha is shown to already be aware of who Sprig is and his relationship with Anne, information she would not find out until the end of the season.

No.	Title	Original release date
1	"Amphibia Food!"	September 1, 2021
Anne has Hop Pop show the recipe to make Amphibia Bug Roast. Unfortunately, the bugs refuse to cooperate and Hop Pop is forced to resort to explosive measures.
2	"Hop Like a Frog!"	September 8, 2021
Sprig and Polly show Anne how to hop like a frog, but her hopping skills are nowhere near as polished as the two little amphibians.
3	"Driving the Amphibian Way!"	September 15, 2021
Anne decides to show off the vehicles in Amphibia and talks about Bessie and all the amazing things she can do, as well as her owner's manual.
4	"Learning About Each Other"	September 22, 2021
Anne tries to get Sprig to do a diagram on learning about others, but instead everyone does art of themselves as humans with Anne creating a frogsona.
5	"Glamour"	September 29, 2021
Anne teaches the Plantars about makeup and glamour. To their surprise Sprig is a natural at it and gives everyone an extreme makeover.
6	"My Dope Life As A Battle Queen! By: Sasha"	October 6, 2021
While Anne tries to show fanciness, her vlog gets hijacked by Sasha who wants to show off what life is like being a "battle queen" with the toads.

=== Broken Karaoke (2022–23) ===
An infrequent series that features Disney Channel characters singing parodies of songs. While the segment typically features the cast of Big City Greens in the lead, there have been two that featured characters from Amphibia. The first two episodes aired shortly after Amphibia's last episode.

No.	Title	Online release date
1	"Sidekicks"	May 15, 2022
Polly teams up with Remy from Big City Greens to sing a parody of "Kicks" from Sneakerella. This short notably features appearances from characters from long ended shows such as Star vs. the Forces of Evil and Gargoyles.
2	"Ways We Feel Anxious"	October 10, 2022
Marcy teams up with Candace from Phineas and Ferb, Gloria from Big City Greens and Libby from The Ghost and Molly McGee to form The Stress Girlz and sing "Ways We Feel Anxious", a parody of "Ways to Be Wicked" from Descendants 2.
3	"Evil As Can Be"	October 7, 2023
King Andrias and Darcy team up with antagonists from several Disney Channel series to sing "Evil As Can Be", a parody of "I'm Finally Me" from Zombies 3.

=== How NOT to Draw (2024) ===
A series of shorts where a certain character from a Disney property, mainly a Disney Channel show, would usually do certain shenanigans as they request from the animator or the artist.

No.	Title	Original release date
1	"How NOT to Draw Polly Plantar"	March 23, 2024
