= Anne Boonchuy =

Fictional character from Amphibia

- Amphibia character
- Anne as she appears in the series
- First appearance: "Anne or Beast?" (2019)
- Last appearance: "The Hardest Thing" (2022)
- Created by: Matt Braly
- Voiced by: Brenda Song; Kai Zen (small child)
- Inspiration: Matt Braly's childhood; Pacifica Northwest from Gravity Falls; Matt Braly's grandmother as a young girl

In-universe information
- Full name: Anne Savisa Boonchuy
- Occupation: Student at Saint James Middle School (formerly); Co-leader of the Wartwood Resistance (formerly); Herpetologist at the Aquarium of the Pacific (currently)
- Affiliation: Saint James Middle School (formerly); Wartwood Resistance (formerly); Aquarium of the Pacific (currently)
- Fighting style: Muay Thai
- Family: Mr. Boonchuy (father); Mrs. Boonchuy (mother); Host family: Hopediah "Hop Pop" Plantar (adoptive grandfather); Sprig Plantar (adoptive brother); Polly Plantar (adoptive sister)
- Home: Los Angeles, California
- Nationality: Thai-American
- Abilities: Athleticism; Resourcefulness; Swordsmanship; Leadership skills; Gemstone powers

Anne Savisa Boonchuy (/sɑːˈviːsɑː ˈbuːntʃɔɪ/ sah-VEE-sah BOON-choy) is the main protagonist of the Disney Channel animated series Amphibia, created by Matt Braly. Voiced by actress Brenda Song, the character debuted in the pilot, "Anne or Beast?" and made her last appearance in the series finale, "The Hardest Thing". Anne is a Thai-American human girl who, on her 13th birthday, gets magically transported to Amphibia alongside her friends Sasha and Marcy after opening a mysterious music box known as the Calamity Box. Upon her arrival, an anthropomorphic family of frogs called the Plantars find her, and over time they form a bond. She is also discovered by the town of Wartwood, who reluctantly let her stay with them.

Anne has been well-received by critics, who praised her character, Song's vocal performance, and her coming-of-age evolution throughout the series.

== Creation ==
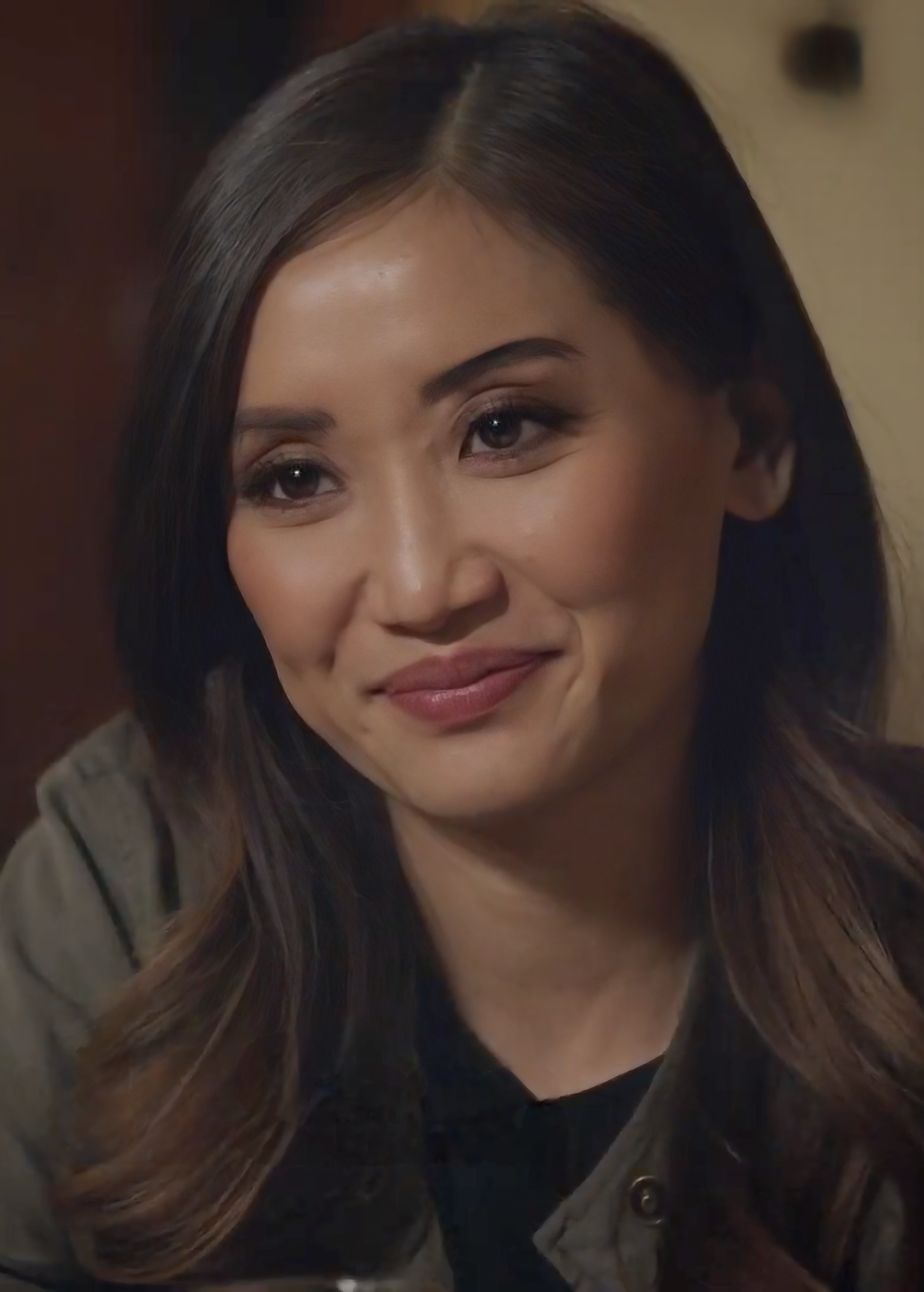
Brenda Song voiced Anne in the series.

According to Matt Braly, he wanted Anne to have a similar arc to Gravity Falls character Pacifica Northwest, as he felt that "to have this character change so drastically was so rewarding, and that's why [he] knew [he] wanted [his] own show to have some of that element as well". Anne, along with Sasha and Marcy, were originally fifteen-years-old because they wanted the series to have a high school-like feel, but were aged down to thirteen in order to appeal to Disney Channel's target demographic; due to this, the trio often do actions more akin to high school students, such as driving and having part-time jobs. Matt Braly revealed on an AMA that Anne's design was slightly influenced by Pepper Ann, as he was a fan of the series. In another interview, Braly also explained that the concept and portrayal of the superpowered form Anne gains at the end of season two, and into season three, took inspiration from the Super Saiyans of the Dragon Ball franchise.

Early concept art by James Turner depicted Anne with a lighter skin tone, blue hair, and casual wear. Later concept art by Joe Sparrow showed that Anne was going to have a much rougher hairstyle and have a more boring personality on Earth. She was also shown to be wearing various styles of clothing, including a SJMS jacket and longer shirt. In the show's pilot, Amphibiland, Anne was originally going to sport both of her shoes, the other one being broken, when being transported to Amphibia.

On March 27, 2019, it was revealed that Brenda Song would star in the series as the voice of Anne. According to Braly, Song ad-libbed several jokes during recording.

== Character ==
=== Design ===
Anne is a tall, slender girl of Thai descent. She has tan skin and short, messy brown hair which, before coming to Amphibia, looked relatively the same. It has leaves and a twig sticking out on top as a sign of her having lived there. After returning to Earth, she got rid of all leaves and twigs, but gains new leaves and twigs shortly after returning to Amphibia.

Anne usually wears her school uniform, which consists of a mauve skirt and undershirt and a light blue-gray shirt with her school's coat of arms on it. She wears white socks, but only one yellow-and-white sneaker, having lost the other one some time before meeting the Plantars; the other sneaker is now in the possession of Captain Grime.

=== Personality ===
Anne is described as fearless and rebellious, as shown in the second segment of the first episode, where she and Sprig defy Hop Pop's orders to stay put and instead go to the lake to swim. Anne is shown to have a zany, silly, and wild side, as shown with interactions with Sprig and those she is close to. She is also very energetic, which has got her both in and out of trouble. Anne embraces her ethnic roots, being rather proud of them. Anne is a pop culture enthusiast with a love for young-adult movies and TV shows. Anne is obsessed with her phone, often watching shows and playing games on it. Despite her recklessness, Anne can often deliver good advice, often encouraging her friends to be honest, even brutally so. This is seen in both "Grubhog Day", where she advises Sprig to tell Hop Pop that he does not want to take care of the grubhog, and "Cursed!", where she tells Sprig to break off his engagement with Maddie due to his fear of her.

Over the course of the first season, Anne displays bouts of homesickness and imprints her hobbies on the Plantars, such as her love of pizza, her pet cat Domino, her TV habits, her obsession with couples, her restaurateur abilities and her dancing prowess. She also begins the series as often egocentric and self-serving, and prone to occasional cruelty, but as she slowly loses her homesickness and becomes used to Amphibia, she also learns to become more selfless and a better friend.

According to Matt Braly, Anne reads manga, "[probably saw] anime", and watched The Lord of the Rings. This is further supported in "Trip to the Archives", where she says "Zoobooks and manga, here I come!".

=== Thai representation ===
Anne is best known for being the first Thai-American lead in an animated show. Braly, who is also Thai-American, chose to make her Thai-American because he wanted more Thai characters in television series. According to Braly, Anne was loosely inspired by his grandmother when she was young. He described Anne being Thai-American as "a number one priority", as he wanted Thai-American kids to see themselves reflected on television. Season 3, which is set on Earth, further delves into Anne's Thai heritage, including an episode set at a Wat Thai temple in Los Angeles. Braly described the temple's representation in the episode as "pretty accurate", as it is important for him to represent Thai culture accurately.

Anne's last name, Boonchuy (Thai: บุญช่วย), roughly translates to "one who encourages or performs good deeds" in the Thai language. This fits her character as she always attempts to help the people of Wartwood and improve herself. Her middle name, Savisa, is derived from Braly's cousin, Savisa Bhumiratana.

== Fictional character biography ==
=== Background ===
Anne lived with her parents in Los Angeles, California and was best friends with two girls named Sasha Waybright and Marcy Wu. On her 13th birthday, Anne is peer-pressured into stealing a mysterious music box that magically transports her, Sasha, and Marcy to the world of Amphibia, a wild marshland tropical island inhabited by anthropomorphic amphibians and threatening creatures, where they are separated from each other.

=== Season 1 ===
After spending five days living in a cave, she is found by Sprig Plantar and quickly befriends him. She is discovered by the rest of the Plantars and the town of Wartwood, who reluctantly let her stay with them. While initially angsty around the Plantars, she realizes that they want to care for her and does her best to please them, especially Sprig, who she has a lot in common with. She lives in their basement, which is prone to flooding. Over time, Anne grows to love the family as her own and wishes for their safety. While the Wartwood citizens openly mock her at first, they slowly warm up to her and accept her as one of them after she protects them from debt collector Toads that the Mayor had cheated. After the Wartwood citizens throw a celebration for her, Anne is reunited with Sasha and learns she is in league with the Toad Warriors. Anne eventually realizes that Sasha had been manipulative of her throughout their friendship and is forced to fight her. They become separated afterward, with Anne becoming distraught over losing her but promising to make things right with her in the future.

=== Season 2 ===
Anne and the Plantars leave Wartwood to find answers to how Anne came to Amphibia and how she can get back home. They arrive in Newtopia where Anne is reunited with Marcy. She was initially protective of her due to her clumsiness, but has now accepted that she can take care of herself. Anne is shown to be slightly jealous of Marcy's intelligence, but realizes that she was better at being socially interactive than her. While in Newtopia, Anne comes to grips with the fact that she misses her mother and wants to be with her more than anything. Along with Marcy, they come to accept that despite her genuinely caring about them, Sasha had always looked down on them. However, they will get her back regardless. Upon discovering that the Calamity Box has lost its power and needs to be recharged, Anne becomes solemn over leaving the Plantars; upon seeing this, Marcy lets her to go back with them so they can retrieve the box together and meet up at the first temple. Upon returning to Wartwood, Anne reveals that she is a practitioner of Muay Thai, due to her mother's insistence.^{[24]} She finds out about Hop Pop lying to her about the Calamity Box and becomes angered. After learning that his fears are related to the death of Sprig and Polly's parents, she forgives him, but admits that she needs time to herself. She later successfully completes the second temple by not only admitting to being dishonest, such as lying about stealing the Calamity Box, but also proving her courageousness in the face of danger. However, she only partially charges her gem, causing her to still retain some of its power. Afterwards, she reunites with Sasha, though she reluctantly accepts her help with the third temple.

When Anne discovers Andrias' true intentions with the Calamity Box, she becomes determined to stop him. During the ensuing confrontation, the power still retained from the Calamity Box gem causes Anne to temporarily enter a superpower state. She returns home to Los Angeles, along with the Plantars and the head of Frobo.

=== Season 3 ===
Upon returning to Earth, Anne is reunited with her parents and introduces them to the Plantars. Her parents begin to notice that she has matured significantly and shows a better appreciation for what they do for her. She even changes her attire upon returning to Earth. While fending off a Cloak-Bot Andrias sent to attack her, Anne realizes that she is still able to wield the power of the blue gem within her, though decides to deter from using it since it tires her out. She eventually comes clean to her parents about why and how she returned, and while they are upset with her for keeping information from them, they realize that she was trying to protect them and the Plantars. In "Froggy Little Christmas", Anne anonymously writes a letter to Marcy and Sasha's parents promising to get them home safely.

After donning a similar outfit to what she wore when she first arrived in Amphibia, Anne eventually makes peace with the fact that she will be leaving her parents again to get back to Amphibia. Upon returning, she and the Plantars find Amphibia in ruins. She also reunites with Sasha. Despite her insistence on taking over the resistance against Andrias, Anne reveals that she now has faith in her to do the right thing. She helps to take down one of the factories. Afterwards, it was noticed that one of her shoes was lost in an earlier incident with a quicksand pit. Anne later comes to terms with the fact that she and Sasha may have directly influenced Marcy's actions that sent them to Amphibia, but learns to forgive her as she had done for Sasha and Hop Pop. Finally knowing who she is and want she wants to do, Anne battles Andrias and defeats him while Sasha frees Marcy. Anne returns to Amphibia where Lady Olivia announces the Resistance's victory, only to witness the moon falling towards.

Realizing that the moon is falling because of the Core, Anne, Sasha, and Marcy are imbued with the powers of the gems to fight it. Unable to do so, Anne sacrifices herself to absorb the gems' power and destroy the moon and the Core. She encounters the Guardian of the gems, who took the form of a female black and white cat that somewhat resembles Domino. It offers that she replace her as the new guardian, but she turns it down, as she is still a teenager and does not yet have the wisdom to watch over the universe. The entity agrees and revives Anne, and she reunites with her friends. After the final battle, she says her farewells to the Plantars before returning home alongside Sasha and Marcy. Ten years later, Anne has become a herpetologist and works at the Aquarium of the Pacific, where she cares for a frog named Sprig.

== Reception ==
Anne's character has received a strong positive reception from critics. Pio Nepomuceno from Screen Rant described her as a "kind yet irresponsible teen that was eager to please her friends even at her own expense." Dave Trumbore of Collider had also praised Anne. However, he also found her friendship with Sprig to be "a little rushed." Ziya Jaffrey from BuzzFeed praised Anne for her "gorgeous arc over the course of the show", but claimed that it took long to "warm up to her as a central character."

Song's performance has been regraded as one of the best in her careers. Jiminna Shillingford from Collider ranked Amphibia as Song's ninth best film/TV series, adding that "Song's performance adds an undeniable charm to the series, producing a great animated show to watch." Meanwhile, Amanda Bruce from Screen Rant ranked Amphibia as her fourth best film/TV series.

== Other media ==
Anne appears as an image in The Owl House episode "King's Tide", as Camila Noceda is cooking with her tablet open to an article that reads "Girl Lost in Frog Land?? HOAX??"

She later appears in Chibi form in Chibiverse, an animated series based on the "Chibi Tiny Tales" shorts.

== See also ==
- List of Amphibia characters
