= Amphibia (TV series) =

American animated television series

- Genre: Action comedy; Adventure; Portal fantasy
- Created by: Matt Braly
- Showrunner: Matt Braly
- Voices of: Brenda Song; Justin Felbinger; Bill Farmer; Amanda Leighton; Anna Akana; Troy Baker; Haley Tju; Keith David
- Theme music composer: Doug Petty
- Opening theme: "Welcome to Amphibia" (instrumental)
- Ending theme: "Anne's Theme" composed by T. J. Hill "Anne's Theme (Remix)" composed by T. J. Hill and vocals performed by Brenda Song, Justin Felbinger, Bill Farmer and Amanda Leighton "Extended End Credits" composed by T. J. Hill
- Composer: T.J. Hill
- Country of origin: United States
- Original language: English
- No. of seasons: 3
- No. of episodes: 58 (106 segments) (list of episodes)

Production
- Executive producer: Matt Braly
- Producer: Tara Badawy
- Running time: 22–48 minutes
- Production company: Disney Television Animation

Original release
- Network: Disney Channel
- Release: June 17, 2019 – May 14, 2022

Amphibia is an American animated fantasy television series created by Matt Braly that aired on Disney Channel from June 17, 2019, to May 14, 2022. The series features the voices of Brenda Song, Justin Felbinger, Bill Farmer, Amanda Leighton, Anna Akana, Troy Baker, Haley Tju, and Keith David. The series follows Anne Boonchuy (Song), a young girl who finds herself trapped in a world of anthropomorphic amphibian creatures.

Amphibia premiered on June 17, 2019, running for three seasons until concluding on May 14, 2022. The series has received positive reviews, with praise for its characters, animation, voice acting, humor, and emotional weight. The series additionally won an award for Best Character Design at the 2021 Annie Awards.

== Premise ==
The series chronicles the adventures of Anne Boonchuy, an independent, fearless and brave Thai-American girl. On her 13th birthday, Anne is peer-pressured into stealing a mysterious, magical music box known as the Calamity Box that magically transports her and her two best friends Sasha Waybright and Marcy Wu to the world of Amphibia, a wild marshland tropical island inhabited by anthropomorphic amphibians and threatening creatures, where they are separated from each other. Anne is taken in by the Plantars, a family of frogs consisting of excitable young Sprig; unpredictable and adventurous baby pollywog Polly; and overprotective and traditional grandfather Hop Pop who live on a farm in the town of Wartwood. As she bonds with her newfound family, Anne gradually learns what it means to be a hero and develop a true friendship, while trying to find her friends and return home. Meanwhile, Sasha allies with Captain Grime, leader of the warfaring toads of Toad Tower, who seek to control their home of Frog Valley.

In the second season, Anne and the Plantars go on a road trip to Newtopia to learn the secrets of the Calamity Box and find a way to get Anne home. There, Anne reunites with Marcy, who offers to help restore the box's power through a series of ancient trials, unaware that Amphibia's ruler, King Andrias, secretly has plans for them. Meanwhile, Sasha and Grime plot to invade Newtopia and overthrow the monarch, allowing the toads to rule over Amphibia.

In the third and final season, Anne and the Plantars are transported to Anne's home in the suburbs of Downtown Los Angeles, where she must now help them adjust to the human world and keep their identities a secret while searching for a way to return to Amphibia and stop Andrias's invasion of the multiverse. Upon returning, they discover Sasha and Grime have formed a resistance force in Wartwood and aid them in their rebellion against Andrias, who is using Marcy as a host for his master, a multi-eyed artificial intelligence entity known as the Core.

== Episodes ==
| Season | Segments | Episodes | Originally released | |
| Season | Segments | Episodes | First released | Last released |
|---|---|---|---|---|
| Pilot | | | —N/a | —N/a |
| 1 | 39 | 20 | June 17, 2019 | July 18, 2019 |
| 2 | 36 | 20 | July 11, 2020 | May 22, 2021 |
| 3 | 31 | 18 | October 2, 2021 | May 14, 2022 |

== Production ==
=== Development ===
On February 23, 2018, Amphibia was greenlit by Disney Channel alongside The Owl House with an order of 20 episodes. The series was created and executive-produced by Matt Braly, previously a storyboard artist on Gravity Falls and later a director on both Gravity Falls and Big City Greens. According to his Twitter account, he had been working on the series for almost two years before being greenlit, though he began to conceive the project while work on Gravity Falls began to conclude. Matt had been developing the series with prototype designs of the protagonists in early 2015. At the time, it was to be called Amphibiland, and was initially planned to take place in the middle of the forest rather than in a town. Also, the character Sprig was planned to be different, namely being anxious, and later mischievous.

On May 15, 2019, Disney Channel renewed Amphibia for a second season of 20 episodes ahead of its premiere.

On June 23, 2020, the show was renewed for a third season of 18 episodes ahead of its second-season premiere. In a Reddit AMA, Braly referred to Amphibia as a "three-act story" with season two as the "2nd act". He further clarified in the AMA that he had "structured the story for 3 [seasons] currently", implying that the third season would serve as the final season of the show. Later on March 16, 2022, storyboard artist Alex Swanson confirmed on Twitter that season 3 was set to be the show's last.

=== Writing ===
The show was based on Braly's childhood trips to Bangkok, Thailand. The series' tone was inspired by films by Aardman Animations and Studio Ghibli, while its storytelling format was inspired by Gravity Falls (which Braly previously worked on) and Steven Universe. Braly was also inspired by video games such as The Legend of Zelda and Chrono Trigger when creating the series. Other inspirations for the series include shows Braly watched in his childhood, such as Batman: The Animated Series and Disney's Gargoyles; he precisely cited Gargoyles as an inspiration for the series' story arc. On Twitter, Braly wrote that the show was also inspired by him watching an episode of Pepper Ann followed by an episode of Dragon Ball Z during his childhood. Pepper Ann's themes and character designs also inspired the show.

According to Braly, one of the reasons he created the series was because he wanted a show whose lead character had a similar arc to Gravity Falls character Pacifica Northwest, as he felt that "to have this character change so drastically was so rewarding, and that's why [he] knew [he] wanted [his] own show to have some of that element as well". Sprig's character underwent several developmental changes; developers explored various ages before ultimately portraying him as a younger brother figure to Anne. Similarly, Anne, Sasha, and Marcy were originally fifteen years old because they wanted the series to have a high school-like feel, but were aged down in order to appeal to the series' target demographic; due to this, the trio often realizes actions more akin to high school students, such as driving and having part-time jobs.

The series marks the first animated show to have a Thai-American lead. Braly, who is also Thai-American, chose to make the series lead character, Anne Boonchuy, Thai-American because he wanted more Thai characters in television series. According to Braly, Anne was loosely inspired by his grandmother. He described Anne being Thai-American as "a number one priority", as he wanted Thai-American kids to see themselves reflected on television. Braly also made the character dark-skinned due to his mother's family being tanned. Season 3, which is set on Earth, further delves into Anne's Thai heritage, including an episode set at a Wat Thai temple in Los Angeles. Braly described the temple's representation in the episode as "pretty accurate", as it is important for him to represent Thai culture accurately.

Braly chose to make the series centered around a frog-populated world because he felt that, due to how frogs change from tadpoles to frogs, they were perfect for the series' theme of change. Braly also implemented themes involving social classes and environmental awareness into the series, with Anne interacting with frogs of several different social backgrounds and learning to "appreciate the natural world around her".

Three of the series' four writers are women, which Braly felt was necessary due to the show centering on a teenage girl. Storyboard artists are allowed to pitch their ideas for an episode, a practice Braly took from his time at Gravity Falls. Braly wanted the series to feature intense sequences, yet still be appropriate for all ages, constantly checking-in whether a scene is too terrifying for children and whether a scene is what it is intended to be.

=== Casting and voice recording ===
On March 27, 2019, it was revealed that Brenda Song would star in the series as the voice of Anne Boonchuy. In April 2019, it was reported that Justin Felbinger would voice Sprig Plantar in the series. On May 15, 2019, it was reported that Amanda Leighton and Bill Farmer joined the cast as the voices of Polly and Hopediah "Hop Pop" Plantar, respectively. Over 50 actresses auditioned for the role of Anne, including Anna Akana and Haley Tju. While the role ultimately went to Song, Braly cast Akana and Tju as Anne's human friends, Sasha and Marcy respectively, instead. According to Braly, certain roles were written with a specific actor in mind, such as King Andrias, who is voiced by Keith David.

Muppet performer Matt Vogel (as Kermit the Frog) made an appearance in the season 2 episode "Swamp and Sensibility". However, Kermit himself (whom Vogel performed since 2017) was credited for the role in promotional material; Kermit previously appeared in two promotional web videos for the series, as well as in a D23 Expo panel promoting both the series and Big City Greens.

Voice actress Anika Noni Rose, best known for starring as Tiana in The Princess and the Frog, was cast in the recurring guest role of Dr. Jan, a museum curator and conspiracy theorist.

According to Braly, Song ad-libbed several jokes during the recording. Similarly, Alex Hirsch improvised several lines for his appearance in the season two episode "Wax Museum". During the COVID-19 pandemic, cast members had to remotely record their lines from their homes, after which they sent their lines to the series' editors.

=== Animation ===
Rough Draft Korea, Sunmin Image Pictures, and Saerom each provide animation. Braly chose those animation studios due to them still working with hand-drawn animation, a style Braly favored for the series. The animators spend three to four months working on pre-production, with an episode taking about nine months to complete. Forty staff members at Walt Disney Studios in Burbank, California also worked on the series.

James Turner, a British illustrator most well known for his work on the Pokémon series of games (having created several Pokémon designs and worked as the art director for Pokémon Sword and Shield), provided artwork during the initial stages of the project. The series' visuals were inspired by Jim Henson's 1982 film The Dark Crystal and the 1977 animated adaptation of The Hobbit. The series' environments were also inspired by natural settings. According to Braly, storyboarding for an episode begins after its script is finished. Braly said that the different character designs for Anne and Marcy, in spite of both characters having Asian backgrounds, were because the producers "never wanted to be trapped into a character design just because of what people might think an Asian person 'should' look like in a cartoon", as the characters "are representations of folks, not caricatures".

By March 24, 2020, Disney Television Animation was closed in response to the COVID-19 pandemic, with work on the series continuing remotely. By that point, the producers had started storyboarding the season 2 finale, while other episodes were only partially completed.

=== Music ===
T. J. Hill composed the score for the series. During production on the series, Leslie Wolfhard, wife of storyboard artist Steve Wolfhard, pitched to the producers a song, which they ended up using in the season 1 episode "Taking Charge". On July 23, 2020, Hill created a SoundCloud playlist featuring 10 tracks from the first season's score.

A song titled "Welcome to Amphibia", performed by Celica Gray Westbook, was originally intended to serve as the series' theme song. However, the song was later discarded in favor of an instrumental theme. According to Braly, "Welcome to Amphibia" was written due to orders from Disney, but he eventually convinced the studio to use an instrumental theme instead, as he felt it did not fit with the show or its main character.

Hyper Potions composed a new version of the instrumental opening for the show's first "Theme Song Takeover" video. A third version of the opening, with lyrics by writer Dan Siegel, was written for the second "Theme Song Takeover" video.

The first-season finale, "Reunion", features the song "Lean on Me" by Bill Withers. Braly said that he constantly listened to the song while developing the relationship between Anne, Marcy, and Sasha, so, when work began on "Reunion", Braly chose to use the song for the scene in which Sasha tries to sacrifice herself.

On April 23, 2021, an extended play album, titled Amphibia: Battle of the Bands, was released. The album features the songs "Heartstomper", written by T.J. Hill and performed by Akana, and "No Big Deal", written by Adam Gubman and performed by Song, Akana, and Tju, as well as instrumental covers of both songs by Hill, Todd McClintock and Adam Gubman, respectively.

Season three featured a Christmas special with a song titled "Our Special Time of Year", which was written by Rebecca Sugar of Steven Universe fame; Braly previously served as a writer and storyboard artist in the Steven Universe episode "Lars and the Cool Kids".

The third-season episode, "All In", features the song "As If It's Your Last" by South Korean girl group, Blackpink.

=== Marketing ===
On July 19, 2018, during the Star vs. the Forces of Evil and Big City Greens panel at San Diego Comic-Con, Disney released an early version of the intro for the series. They also gave away a limited-edition plush toy of Sprig Plantar.

On April 26, 2019, Disney FanFest released a music video for a vocal version of the opening theme titled ″Welcome to Amphibia″ performed by Celica Gray Westbrook and a two-minute clip during a livestream. It was originally planned to be used as the show's theme song.

On May 14, 2019, Disney Channel released the trailer, with Disney Channel releasing the final version of the intro 3 days later.

Amphibia also included shorts and a point and click game named Amphibia: Locust Pocus. The shorts began with Teen Girl in a Frog World and premiered on September 3, 2019.

== Reception ==
=== Critical reception ===
Common Sense Media's Emily Ashby rated the show 4 out of 5 stars and praised the series for its characters and themes, writing that "Sprig and Anne's adventures are a joy to behold, mostly thanks to their delightfully compatible personalities and the sweet friendship that develops between them" and that "the story illustrates issues like bullying and emotional manipulation in ways that will resonate with kids and tweens and can prompt discussions about the topics". Bekah Burbank of LaughingPlace.com praised the series' ability to balance its humor and its terror elements, as well as its pacing, characters, and animation, stating that "Amphibia is clever and goofy with plenty of jokes to keep kids laughing and just enough scary content to hold their attention. The show moves quickly and is broken into two 11-minute episodes that, at least for the premiere, form one complete chapter. The animation is bouncy and colorful and the characters are a delight". Collider's Dave Trumbore gave the series' first two episodes a 4 stars rating, feeling that they "[served] as a great introduction to the series".

=== Ratings ===
Viewership and ratings per season of Amphibia
| Season | Episodes | First aired | | Last aired | | Avg. viewers (millions) |
| Season | Episodes | Date | Viewers (millions) | Date | Viewers (millions) | Avg. viewers (millions) |
|---|---|---|---|---|---|---|
| 1 | 20 | June 17, 2019 | 0.39 | July 18, 2019 | 0.34 | 0.41 |
| 2 | 20 | July 11, 2020 | 0.39 | May 22, 2021 | 0.33 | 0.36 |
| 3 | 18 | October 2, 2021 | 0.43 | May 14, 2022 | 0.35 | 0.33 |

=== Accolades ===
The show won an Annie Award for "Best Character Design" in 2021. In the same year, it was nominated for an Emmy Award for "Outstanding Children's Animated Program", but it lost to Hilda. The season 2 finale, "True Colors", was nominated for the 2022 Annie Awards for "Best TV/Media - Children", "Best Direction - TV/Media", and "Best Editorial - TV/Media".

| Year | Award | Category | Nominee(s) | Result | Ref. |
|---|---|---|---|---|---|
| 2021 | Annie Awards | Best Character Design | Joe Sparrow (for "The Shut-In") | Won | |
| 2021 | Daytime Emmys | Outstanding Children's Animated Series | Amphibia | Nominated | |
| 2022 | Annie Awards | Best TV/Media – Children | "True Colors" | Nominated | |
| 2022 | Annie Awards | Best Direction - TV/Media | Kyler Spears & Jenn Strickland (for "True Colors") | Nominated | |
| 2022 | Annie Awards | Best Editorial - TV/Media | Jennifer Calbi, Julie Anne Lau, Andrew Sorcini, David Vasquez & Yoonah Yim (for "True Colors") | Nominated | |
| 2022 | GLAAD Media Award | Outstanding Kids and Family Programming | Amphibia | Nominated | |
| 2022 | Children's and Family Emmys | Outstanding Writing for an Animated Program | Amphibia | Nominated | |
| 2022 | Children's and Family Emmys | Outstanding Voice Directing for an Animated Series | Eden Riegel | Nominated | |
| 2023 | Annie Awards | Best Character Design – TV/Media | Joe Sparrow (for "The Hardest Thing") | Nominated | |
| 2023 | Annie Awards | Best Editorial – TV/Media | Andrew Sorcini, Yoonah Yim, Jennifer Calbi, Julie Anne Lau, & Louis Russell (for "All In") | Nominated | |
| 2023 | GLAAD Media Award | Outstanding Kids and Family Programming - Animated | Amphibia | Nominated | |

== In other media ==
Characters from Amphibia appear in Chibiverse, an animated series based on the "Chibi Tiny Tales" shorts.

A book based on the series, titled Marcy's Journal: A Guide to Amphibia was released on December 6, 2022, by Disney Books and TokyoPop. The book, which is a real-life version of Marcy's journal seen through the series, was written by creator Matt Braly and show writer Adam Colás, with illustrations by Amphibia character designer Catharina Sukiman. According to Braly, the book features stories not seen within the series, as well as further explore the show's lore and provide further character insight.

A second book was published Disney Books and TokyoPop, in March 2025. Entitled The Art of Amphibia, and 225 pages long, it includes the artwork of the three seasons of the series, development of the series, and crew artwork, with the book's foreword by Brenda Song. Braly also stated that the book would not be the last book on Amphibia being made with Tokyopop, noting "another very exciting project that is...being written and drawn," focusing on Sprig.

== Future ==
In 2025, while promoting the graphic novel spin-off Amphibia: Strange Voyage, Matt Braly revealed that he was in talks with Disney about possibly developing either a television special or miniseries, picking up from where the show left off. The book was set to release on November 4, 2026, but was delayed until January 6, 2027.
