= Matt Braly =

American animator (born 1988)

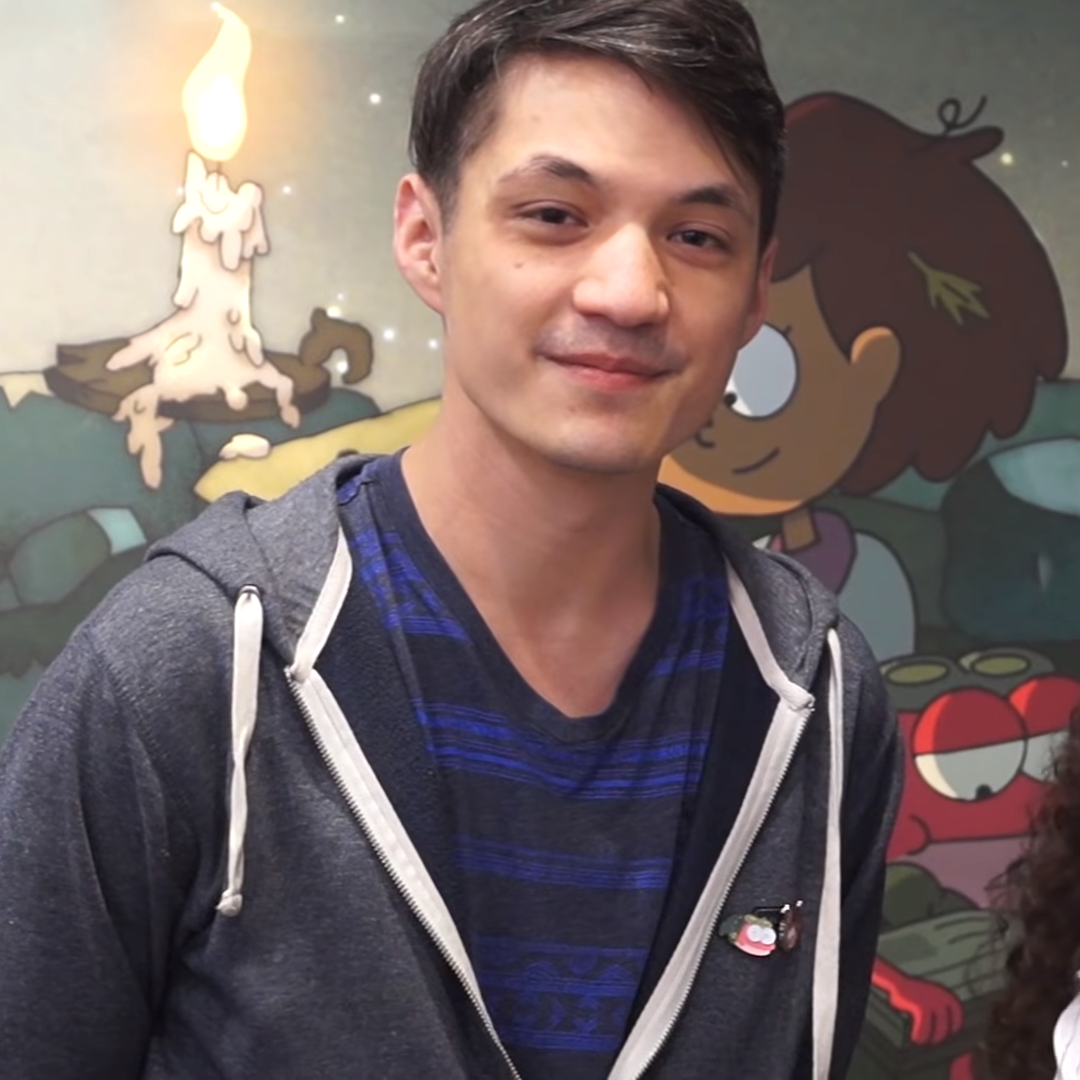
- Braly in 2019
- Born: Matthew Benjakarn Braly; November 8, 1988 (age 37); Sacramento, California, U.S.
- Education: California Institute of the Arts (BFA)
- Occupations: Animator; storyboard artist; director; producer; writer
- Years active: 2010–present
- Employers: DreamWorks Animation (2010–2012); Disney Television Animation (2012–2022); Sony Pictures Animation (2022–2026); Fantasy Project (2026–present)
- Known for: Amphibia
- Spouse: Katherine Bedrosian (m. 2018)
- Children: 1
- Mother: On Braly

Matthew Benjakarn Braly (born November 8, 1988) is a Thai-American animator, storyboard artist, writer, and director. He is best known as the creator and executive producer of the Disney Channel animated series Amphibia. He also worked as a director on Gravity Falls and Big City Greens.

== Early life ==
Braly was born in Sacramento on November 8, 1988, and raised in Davis, while spending his summers, as a child, with his mother's family in Bangkok, Thailand. He also grew up in a bilingual household. As a child, Braly used to watch films such as Mortal Kombat (1995) because they were filmed in Thailand, as there was no Thai representation on television. He would later draw characters from franchises like Mortal Kombat and Sonic the Hedgehog.

At age 17, in 2006, he graduated from Christian Brothers High School, a private, Catholic, college-preparatory high school in the Oak Park neighborhood of Sacramento. Prior to graduating, Braly was inspired to pursue a career in animation after a "career day" at high school, where a Pixar animator drew an image of Lumiere from Disney's Beauty and the Beast while talking about working on animation for a living. He started his career studying at the California Institute of the Arts (CalArts); he graduated in 2010 with a Bachelor of Fine Arts.

== Career ==
After graduating from California Institute of the Arts, he joined DreamWorks Animation, where he worked as a storyboard artist for Turbo (2013). While working on Turbo, Braly and several other DreamWorks Animation storyboard artists went to visit Alex Hirsch, who was working on a show titled Gravity Falls (2012–16) for Disney Television Animation. Hirsch also went to CalArts and, while they never studied together, Braly liked his student films. During the visit, Hirsch pitched Gravity Falls to Braly.

Fascinated by the concept and how Hirsch wanted it to be a serialized program, Braly did a test to work on the show, after which he was hired, serving as a storyboard artist and director for the series. Braly credited Hirsch as the one who "taught [him] so much about storytelling, about developing characters and developing a world", as well as the one who inspired him to create his own show. The series premiered on June 15, 2012, and ended on February 15, 2016. In 2016, Braly won an Annie Award for directing the Gravity Falls episode "Northwest Mansion Mystery". Braly also served as an in-house key animator for the closing scene for the episode "Not What He Seems".

After directing on Big City Greens, Braly developed a series titled Amphibia for Disney Channel. The series centers on the adventures of a Thai-American girl named Anne Boonchuy in the titular amphibian-populated world. The series was inspired by Braly's childhood trips to Bangkok, Thailand, where he felt like an outsider but ultimately ended up not wanting to leave. He also drew inspiration from video games such as The Legend of Zelda and Chrono Trigger. Braly, who is Thai-American himself, made the choice of making the lead character Thai-American due to a wish to creating a Thai character, as there were few Thai lead characters in television series when he was a kid. The series aired for three seasons consisting of 58 episodes from June 17, 2019, to May 14, 2022. He considers the series finale "The Hardest Thing" to be his favorite episode.

After Amphibia ended production in May 2022, Braly left Disney Television Animation. In August 2023, he wrote a Sonic the Hedgehog online comic strip as a part of the Sonic Fast Friends Forever campaign. Braly mentioned that he was currently working on multiple feature films, including a fantasy-adventure film for Sony Pictures Animation he was set to direct and co-write with longtime collaborator Rebecca Sugar. In February 2026, Braly announced on social media that the film, about a teenage boy traveling to a world filled with Thai spirits before he undergoes an important life-altering medical operation, and inspired by his own life story and background, was scrapped at Sony Pictures Animation in early 2025, with the studio determining that the film was not "commercial enough" to produce. In May 2026, Braly announced that a Thai animation studio, THE MONK Studios, had acquired rights to the film, under the name "Afterworld: กลับบ้าน", but that it was not funded, in production, or greenlit, but that the studio would be at Annecy trying to get "potential partners and investors". He also said that he was stepping aside a director, focusing on Clara And The Below, until the studio can "secure the means" to produce the film, and that no A.I. would be used in the film's production.

Braly also developed a graphic novel, which was announced in August 2024 as Family Force V. Skybound Comet published the graphic novel in May 2025. Braly is also supervising development on a series of shorts exploring social issues. In November 2024, Braly responded to the reported shelving of an episode of Moon Girl and Devil Dinosaur, focusing on a transgender character, by Disney, calling it "absolute cowardice" when content like the episode is needed more now than ever, and said it was a "total breakdown" of the process.

On February 11, 2026, Braly announced that he founded his own animation studio, Fantasy Project. Its first project would be Clara and the Below, a gothic horror adaptation of The Nutcracker, with a crowdfunding campaign on Kickstarter. On March 17, 2026, Braly launched a Kickstarter for the series, with a goal of funding a single episode which was 6-10 minutes for a cost of $25,000. After less than a week, it earned "more than ten times" that target amount, at over $231,000 by March 23, 2026. TJ Hill, who did work on Amphibia, serves as the music composer. The first episode is slated to release on December 25, 2026. Braly told Cartoon Brew that his goal is to produce four interconnected animated shorts to form a "roughly 24-minute film," focusing on Clara in the first section, and others on different characters. He described that Samurai Jack as a major inspiration since he is a fan of Genndy Tartakovsky, while ensuring his crew is "fairly compensated" through crowdfunding.

== Personal life ==
Braly is of Thai descent. His mother, On Braly, provided the voice of Mrs. Boonchuy on Amphibia, in her first-ever voice acting role. Braly married Katherine "Katie" Bedrosian, a software engineer, on April 21, 2018 at the Sacramento Zoo. Prior to this he attended the same high school, Christian Brothers High School, with her, with both graduating the same year. They had their first child, Alex, on January 31, 2025. Braly and Bedrosian also have a cat named Domino.

Braly is a fan of the Sonic the Hedgehog franchise, and was inspired by the opening sequence in the first episode of the anime Sonic X for the climax of the Amphibia episode "True Colors". Similarly, he was inspired by several horror films for the episode "The Shut-In" due to being a horror fan. He is also a fan of the Disney series Gargoyles and the film The Princess and the Frog; cast members from both productions have appeared through Amphibia. Both Braly and his wife are fans of RuPaul's Drag Race; RuPaul himself had a recurring role in season 3 of Amphibia as Mr. X.

Braly has suffered from short bowel syndrome since childhood.

== Filmography ==
=== Films ===
Year	Title	Storyboard artist	Others	Notes
2012	Adam and Dog	No	Yes	Assistant animator Short film
2013	Turbo	Yes	No	
2021	The Mitchells vs. the Machines	Yes	No	Uncredited

=== Television ===
Year	Title	Creator	Executive producer	Writer	Storyboard artist	Director	Actor	Others	Role	Notes
2012–2016	Gravity Falls	No	No	No	Yes	Yes	No	Yes		8 episodes Key animator (Note: Episode "Not What He Seems" only)
2014	Steven Universe	No	No	Yes	Yes	No	No	No		Episode: "Lars and the Cool Kids"
2017	Billy Dilley's Super-Duper Subterranean Summer	No	No	No	Yes	No	No	No		Storyboard revisionist Episodes: "Lab Friends... Forever?" and "Surviving Billy"
2017	DuckTales	No	No	No	No	No	No	Yes		Additional character designer Episode: "Woo-oo!"
2018	Big City Greens	No	No	Yes	Yes	Yes	No	No		7 episodes
2019–2022	Amphibia	Yes	Yes	Yes	Yes	No	Yes	No	Chuck; Newtopian gatekeeper The Seamstress; Additional voices	Executive producer
2023	The Owl House	No	No	No	No	No	No	Yes		Special Thanks; Episode: "Watching and Dreaming"

=== Web ===
Year	Title	Creator	Executive producer	Writer	Storyboard artist	Director	Actor	Others	Notes
2025	Knights of Guinevere	No	No	No	No	No	No	Yes	Special Thanks
2026	Toonout	Yes	No	Yes	Yes	Yes	No	Yes	Episode: Crossed Animals
2027	Clara and the Below	Yes	Yes	TBA	TBA	TBA	TBA	TBA	Indie animated series

== Bibliography ==
Year	Title	Original publisher	Notes
2022	Amphibia: Marcy's Journal - A Guide to Amphibia	Disney Press; TOKYOPOP	Co-author with Adam Colas
2025	The Art of Amphibia	Disney Press; TOKYOPOP	Co-author with Drew Taylor
2025	Family Force V	Skybound Comet	Co-author with Ainsworth Lin
TBA	Amphibia: Strange Voyage	Disney Press; TOKYOPOP	Co-author with Beatrice Bovo

== Nominations and awards ==
Year	Award	Category	Nominee	Result	Ref
2016	43rd Annie Awards	Outstanding Achievement, Directing in an Animated TV/Broadcast Production	Gravity Falls (for "Northwest Mansion Mystery")	Won	
2021	Daytime Emmys	Outstanding Children's Animated Series	Amphibia	Nominated	
2022	Annie Awards	Best TV/Media – Children	"True Colors"	Nominated	
2022	33rd GLAAD Media Awards	Outstanding Kids and Family Programming	Amphibia	Nominated	
2022	Children's and Family Emmys	Outstanding Writing for an Animated Program	Amphibia	Nominated	
2023	34th GLAAD Media Awards	Outstanding Kids and Family Programming	Amphibia	Nominated	
