= List of animated feature films of 2026 =

This is a list of animated feature films in 2026.

== List ==
Title	Country	Director	Production company	Animation technique	Notes	Release date	Duration
58th	Philippines	Carl Joseph Papa	GMA Pictures	Rotoscoping		January 31, 2026 (Rotterdam)	86 minutes
1881 Atatürk: Bir Liderin Doğuşu	Turkey	Burak Kaan Şimşeker	Vistamotion; Blackframe Animation; A90 Pictures	Computer		April 29, 2026	77 minutes
5002 Space Aliens	United States	Scott Bateman	Lucas A. Ferrara	Rotoscoping		August 10, 2026	85 minutes
Ainak Wala Jin - The Movie	Pakistan	Farhan M Khan	Pakistan Television; Farhan Khan Films	AI-generated		July 24, 2026	85 minutes
All Wishes Come True!	China	Mu Zhengyang	Pearl Studio; CMC Pictures; Tianjin Maoyan Weiying Culture Media; Ruyi Film; China Film Group; Beijing Menggu Culture Media; Damai Entertainment Holdings; Beijing Enlight Pictures	Computer		July 18, 2026	144 minutes
All You Need Is Kill	Japan	Kenichiro Akimoto	Studio 4°C	Computer; Traditional		June 9, 2025 (Annecy); January 9, 2026 (Japan)	82 minutes
Allen	Australia	Daley Pearson, Jeffrey Walker	Ludo Studio	Computer; Live-action		December 11, 2026	105 minutes
Amadeo and the Hypothetical New World; Amadeo e o hipotético mundo novo	Brazil	Brenda Lígia; Edu Felistoque	Felistoque Cinema; Sol de Barros Films; Refugio Onirico; Sagui Studio; Assum Films; The Flying Frames; Dreambox	Traditional		June 15, 2026	104 minutes
The Amazing Digital Circus: The Last Act	Australia	Gooseworx	Glitch Productions; Fathom Entertainment; Encore Films	Computer		June 4, 2026	93 minutes
The Angry Birds Movie 3	Finland; United States; United Kingdom; Hong Kong; Japan	John Rice	Paramount Pictures; Rovio Entertainment; Sega Sammy Group; One Cool Films; Dentsu; Prime Focus Studios; DNEG Animation; Flywheel Media	Computer		December 23, 2026	96 minutes
Animal Farm	Canada; United Kingdom; United States	Andy Serkis	6th & Idaho Productions; The Imaginarium Studios; Aniventure; Cinesite	CG animation		June 9, 2025 (Annecy); May 1, 2026 (United States)	96 minutes
Another World	Hong Kong	Tommy Kai Chung Ng	Point Five Productions; SILVER MEDIA GROUP; Film Development Council	Traditional		June 16, 2025 (Annecy); October 29, 2025 (Hong Kong, Macau); December 25, 2025 (Malaysia); January 30, 2026 (United Kingdom, Ireland)	111 minutes
Anpanman: Pantan and the Star of Promises	Japan	Hiroyuki Yano	TMS Entertainment	Traditional		June 26, 2026	62 minutes
The Apothecary Diaries: The Late Lady's Treasure	Japan	Norihiro Naganuma	OLM; Toho Animation Studio	Traditional		December 11, 2026	
Arctic Heroes	Russia	Alexey Zamyslov; Olga Mayborodina	Voronezh Animation Studio	Computer		May 30, 2026 (Golden Raven Arctic International Film Festival)	93 minutes
Armored Trooper VOTOMS: Die Graue Hexe Part 1	Japan	Mamoru Oshii	Sunrise	Traditional		November 20, 2026	100 minutes
Arnie and Barney: The Water Quest	Belgium; Germany	Sean Heuston	Studio 100 Film	Computer		September 3, 2026	75 minutes
Ash & Crayons	Ukraine; Czechia	Evgeny Afineevsky	Unbroken Generation Productions; Karandash Animation Studios; PFX	Computer; Live-action	Documentary	December 3, 2026	98 minutes
Assassination Classroom the Movie: Our Time	Japan	Masaki Kitamura	Lerche	Traditional		March 20, 2026	87 minutes
Asterix, the Kingdom of Nubia	France	Alexandre Heboyan	SND; M6 Studio	Computer		October 14, 2026	86 minutes
Astrodude: A SolarBalls Movie	United Kingdom	Alvaro Calmet	Telos Media	Flash animation		November 14, 2026	62 minutes
Atlas: The Animated Movie	United States	Austin McConnell	Kickstarter; Francesco Capussela	Computer		September 12, 2026 (Springfield, MO); August 30, 2026 (Digital)	91 minutes
Avatar Aang: The Last Airbender	United States	Lauren Montgomery	Paramount Pictures; Paramount Animation; Nickelodeon Movies; Avatar Studios	Traditional		July 24, 2026 (San Diego Comic-Con & United States); July 25, 2026 (Worldwide)	99 minutes
BanG Dream! Ave Mujica Prima Aurora	Japan	Kōdai Kakimoto	Nichicaline	Traditional		October 16, 2026	58 minutes
Barbie in the Nutcracker	United States	Rob David; Teale Sperling	Netflix; Mattel Studios	Computer		November 1, 2026	45 minutes
Batman: Knightfall	United States	Jeff Wamester	Warner Bros. Animation; DC Entertainment	Traditional		June 23, 2026 (Annecy); August 25, 2026 (Part 1); December 8, 2026 (Part 2); 2027 (Part 3)	79 minutes (Part 1); 76 minutes (Part 2)
Star Blazers: Space Battleship Yamato 3199: Part 5: White Heat Galactic War	Japan	Harutoshi Fukui; Naomichi Yamato	Satelight	Traditional		February 20, 2026	101 minutes
Bem, A Lemur on the Run	Mexico	Leopoldo Aguilar	Chiltepin Estudios	Flash animation		April 30, 2026	85 minutes
Blaise	France	Dimitri Planchon; Jean-Paul Guigue	KG Production	Cutout		May 14, 2026 (Cannes Film Festival); January 27, 2027	83 minutes
Bleach: Thousand-Year Blood War - The Calamity	Japan	Hikaru Murata; Chen Dali	Pierrot	Traditional		June 25, 2026	80 minutes
Blooming Wonders: Tales of the Forest	France	Inès Bernard-Espina; Mélody Boulissière; Clémentine Campos	Miyu Production	Traditional		June 30, 2026 (La Rochelle International Film Festival); February 3, 2027	35 minutes
Bluey at the Cinema: Playdates with Friends	Australia; United Kingdom	Richard Jeffery; Joe Brumm	BBC Studios; Ludo Studio	Flash animation		March 26, 2026	66 minutes
Bollywoof	United Kingdom	Frederic Du Chau	Prime Focus Studios; Cantilever Media; Newscope Films; Sky Cinema	Computer		November 15, 2026 (LIFF); January 22, 2027 (United Kingdom)	95 minutes
Boonie Bears: The Hidden Protector	China	Huida Lin	Fantawild Animation	Computer		February 17, 2026	118 minutes
Born in the Jungle	Latvia; Poland; Czech Republic	Edmunds Jansons	Atom Art; Letko; Hausboot Production	Flash Animation		June 22, 2026 (Annecy); July 3, 2026 (France)	70–72 minutes
Bouchra; For Aicha	Italy; Morocco; United States	Meriem Bennani; Orian Barki	Fondazione Prada; 2 Lizards Production; Hi Production; SB Films	Computer		October 31, 2024 (Milan); September 5, 2025 (Toronto); September 27, 2025 (New York); October 10, 2025 (Bordeaux); October 19, 2025 (Rome); June 26, 2026 (United States)	73 minutes (original cut); 83 minutes (festival run)
Brave Cat	Chile	Gabriel Osorio	Punkrobot Studios	Computer		June 23, 2026 (Annecy Festival)	93 minutes
Brohr	Denmark	Malthe Emil Kibsgaard; Adrian Hosseinpour	Hyæne Film; Nordisk Film Distribution	Traditional		September 24, 2026	84 minutes
Butterfly Lovers	Hong Kong	Raman Hui Shing-Ngai	Edko Films	Computer		September 25, 2026	93 minutes
The Cat in the Hat	United States	Erica Rivinoja; Alessandro Carloni	Warner Bros. Pictures; Warner Bros. Pictures Animation; Dr. Seuss Enterprises; DNEG Animation	Computer		November 6, 2026	107 minutes
Cats in the Museum 2: Treasures of Egypt	Russia	Vasily Rovensky	Licensing Brands; Cinema Foundation of Russia	Computer		March 26, 2026	90 minutes
Catch! Teenieping: Legend of the Whale Heartstone 사랑의 하츄핑: 고래보석의 전설	South Korea	Kim Su-hoon	SAMG Entertainment	Computer		August 5, 2026	105 minutes
Charlie the Wonderdog	Canada	Shea Wageman	ICON Creative Studio	Computer		October 24, 2025 (Poland); January 16, 2026 (North America)	92 minutes
Cheburashka 2	Russia	Dmitry Dyachenko	Yellow, Black and White; START Studio; Soyuzmultfilm; Russia-1; CTC Media; Cinema Fund	Computer; Live-action		January 1, 2026	103 minutes
Cherry and Virgin	Japan	Masanao Kawajiri	Toei Video Company	Traditional		July 18, 2026 (Fantasia Film Festival); 2027	87 minutes
Chiikawa the Movie: The Secret of the Mermaid Island	Japan	Kei Oikawa	Medialink; CyPic; QTORY; Fuji Animation Studio	Traditional		July 24, 2026	99 minutes
Children of Liberty	France; Luxembourg	Rémy Schaepman; Léahn Vivier-Chapas	Folivari; Tchack; Melusine Productions	Traditional		August 8, 2026 (Locarno Film Festival); February 10, 2027	80 minutes
Chimney Town: Frozen in Time	Japan	Yusuke Hirota	Studio 4°C	Computer; Traditional		February 16, 2026 (Berlin); March 27, 2026 (Japan)	98 minutes
Cilgin Bocekler	Turkey	Burak Kaan Şimşeker	NNC Grup Dağıtım	Computer; Live-action		September 4, 2026	80 minutes
Company Sports Day	South Korea	Lee Yong-sun	DAEGULDAEGUL STUDIO	Traditional		June 22, 2026 (Annecy International Animation Film Festival); July 3, 2026 (Bucheon International Fantastic Film Festival)	113 minutes
Conni – Mystery of the Crane	Germany	Dirk Hampel	Youngfilms; Senator Film Produktion	Computer		May 14, 2026	77 minutes
Copán La Leyenda	Honduras	Ricardo Morales	Level 7 Studios	AI-generated		May 7, 2026	74 minutes
Cosmic Crew: Ice Planet	China	Liu Peng	Perfect Kunpeng (Beijing) Film & Animation Co., Ltd.	Computer		January 24, 2026	89 minutes
Cosmic Princess Kaguya!	Japan	Shingo Yamashita	Studio Colorido; Studio Chromato	Traditional		January 22, 2026	142 minutes
Coyote vs. Acme	United States	Dave Green	Ketchup Entertainment; Warner Animation Group	Computer; Traditional; Live-action		August 28, 2026	103 minutes
Crayon Shin-chan the Movie: Spooky! My Yokai Vacation	Japan	Masaki Watanabe	Shin-Ei Animation	Traditional		July 31, 2026	101 minutes
The Crystal Planet	United States; Croatia; Czechia; France; Hungary; Belgium; Slovakia	Arsen Anton Ostojić	BFILM; Filmosaurus Rex; Alkay Animation Prague; Hrvatski Audiovizualni Centar; Czech Audiovisual Fund; Slovak Audiovisual Fund; Česká televise Hrvatska Radiotelevizija; Creative Europe Media; Eurimages	Computer		August 13, 2026	97 minutes
Curly Burly	Denmark	Jan Rahbek	Sola Media	Computer; Live-action		February 5, 2026	80 minutes
Daisy's Life	Japan	Masaaki Yuasa	Miyu Productions	Traditional		2026	
The Dangers in My Heart: The Movie	Japan	Hiroaki Akagi; Chen Dali	Shin-Ei Animation	Traditional		February 13, 2026	102 minutes
Dante; Dante och miljonerna	Sweden; Denmark; Norway	Linda Hambäck	LEE Film; Svenska Filminstitutet; Nørlum; Mikrofilm	Traditional		March 7, 2026 (BUFF Film Festival 2026, Malmö); June 18, 2026 (Shanghai International Film Festival)	76 minutes
Demon Agent	China	Cheng Teng	Shenzhen Qianwanjian Industria Cinematográfica Co., Ltd. Bingdi Yinghua Audio-Visual Media (Tianjin) Co., Ltd. Tianjin Maoyan Weiying Culture and Media Co., Ltd. Beijing Dream City Culture Co., Ltd.	Computer		August 6, 2026 (Beijing); August 6, 2026 (Limted); August 22, 2026	117 minutes
Detective Conan: Fallen Angel of the Highway	Japan	Takahiro Hasui	TMS Entertainment	Traditional		April 10, 2026	109 minutes
Diary of a Wimpy Kid: The Getaway	United States; Canada	Matt Danner	Walt Disney Pictures; Bardel Entertainment; 20th Century Animation	Computer		December 4, 2026	
Dominykas the Horse's Journey to the Stars	Lithuania	Vytautas V. Landsbergis	Tauras Films	Computer		January 16, 2026	80 minutes
Doraemon: New Nobita and the Castle of the Undersea Devil	Japan	Tetsuo Yajima	Shin-Ei Animation	Traditional		February 27, 2026	102 minutes
Doremi Dalimi the Movie: Sing-Along Party	South Korea	Lee Byeong-jik; Song In-uk		Computer		May 1, 2026	70 minutes
Dudley & the Invasion of the Space Slugs	Luxembourg; Belgium; France; India	Cherifa Bakhti	Fabrique d'images Broadvision Perspectives; Fantabulous; Freaks Factory	Computer		June 22, 2026 (Annecy International Animated Film Festival); October 17, 2026 (Newport Beach Film Festival); July 15, 2027 (Russia)	83 minutes
Ella Arcangel: Ballad of Tooth and Claw	Philippines	Mervin Malonzo	GMA Pictures; Twenty Manila; Haliya Publishing; Rocketsheep Studio	Traditional		November 13, 2026	90 minutes
Ellie the Elephant; Ellie de olifant - De grote reis	Netherlands	Ellen Langendam	Art Wise	Flash animation		February 11, 2026	60 minutes
Emi Martínez: The Kid Who Stops Time	Argentina; United Kingdom	Gustavo Cova	Netflix Animation Studios; PEGSA Group	Traditional; Live-action		May 28, 2026	77 minutes
Evolution	Spain	Julio Soto Gurpide; Zayra Muñoz Dominguez	The Thinklab; Kapers Animation; 3 Doubles Producciones; Beta Fiction Spain	Computer		February 6, 2026	94 minutes
Expelled from Paradise: Resonance from the Heart	Japan	Seiji Mizushima	Toei Animation	Computer		November 13, 2026	128 minutes
Festive Fun with Peppa	United Kingdom	Mark Baker; Neville Astley	Karrot Animation; Trafalgar Entertainment; Hasbro Entertainment	Flash animation		November 14, 2026	60 minutes
Forgotten Island	United States	Joel Crawford; Januel Mercado	Universal Pictures; DreamWorks Animation	Computer		September 25, 2026	109 minutes
Foufu	Indonesia	Bayu Skak	Skak Studios; SinemArt; Legacy Pictures; Tretan Universe Production; Advan	Computer; Live-action		July 9, 2026	120 minutes
Fru! 2	Poland		L4ine Media Animation 2D and 3D Polska	Computer		June 27, 2026	85 minutes
Garuda: Dare to Dream	Indonesia; Singapore; Taiwan; South Korea	Ronny Gani	BASE Entertainment; PK Films; AHHA Production; KAWI Animation; Springboard Entertainment; Robot Playground Media; DaSun Pictures; BolaLob; BRD Studios; Barunson E&A; Investasi Film Indonesia; ARENDI; Singapore Film Commission	Computer		June 18, 2026 (Shanghai International Film Festival); June 11, 2026	78 minutes
GG Bond: Race Through Time	China	Gu Yanmei	WinSing Animation	Computer		May 1, 2026	86 minutes
Ghost	Japan	Shingo Natsume	Bandai Namco Filmworks; Madhouse	Traditional		November 1, 2026 (Tokyo International Film Festival); February 11, 2027	110 minutes
Gintama: Yoshiwara in Flames	Japan	Naoya Ando	Bandai Namco Filmworks	Traditional		February 13, 2026	124 minutes
Girl and Wolf; Chica y lobo	Spain; Portugal	Roc Espinet	Hampa Studio; Sygnatia; Alesa Produccions; Boavista Filmes	Traditional		November 14, 2026 (FICX); February 12, 2027 (Spain)	85 minutes
Girl in the Clouds	France; Belgium	Philippe Riche	Brio Films; SCOPE Pictures; Panama Productions	Computer		June 22, 2026	88 minutes
Girls und Panzer: Motto Love Love Sakusen Desu!	Japan	Masami Shimoda; Takahiko Usui	P.A. Works; Actas	Traditional		January 30, 2026 (Act 2); March 6, 2026 (Act 3); April 10, 2026 (Act 4)	72 minutes
Girls und Panzer das Finale: Part 5	Japan	Masami Shimoda; Takahiko Usui	P.A. Works; Actas	Traditional		October 9, 2026	55 minutes
Goat	United States	Tyree Dillihay	Columbia Pictures; Sony Pictures Animation; Unanimous Media; Modern Magic	Computer		February 6, 2026 (Los Angeles); February 13, 2026 (United States)	100 minutes
GoGo Dino the Movie: Insect World Adventure 고고다이노 극장판: 곤충세계 대모험	South Korea	Lee Sun-myung	Moggozi	Computer		January 14, 2026	66 minutes
Grotesqqque	Japan	Atsushi Nishigori	CloverWorks	Traditional		July 24, 2026 (Fantasia); November 6, 2026 (Japan)	104 minutes
Hexed	United States	Jason Hand; Fawn Veerasunthorn	Walt Disney Animation Studios	Computer		November 25, 2026	103 minutes
Hoppers	United States	Daniel Chong	Disney; Pixar Animation Studios	Computer		February 23, 2026 (El Capitan Theatre); February 28, 2026 (NYICFF); March 6, 2026 (United States)	104 minutes
How to Save the Immortal 2: Elixir of Life	Russia	Roman Artemyev	KinoAtis; CTB Film Company; Cinema Foundation of Russia	Computer		May 28, 2026	75 minutes
In Waves	France; Belgium; United States	Phuong Mai Nguyen	Silex Films; Panique! Charades; France 3 Cinéma; Anonymous Content; Gao Shan Pictures	Traditional		May 13, 2026 (Cannes Critics' Week); June 23, 2026 (Annecy International Animation Film Festival); June 26, 2026 (Biarritz Film Festival - Nouvelles Vagues); July 1, 2026 (Theatrical); December 11, 2026 (Digital)	91 minutes
Iron Boy	France; Belgium	Louis Clichy	Beside Production; RTBF; Eddy Cinéma; Regular Production; France 3 Auvergne-Rhône-Alpes Cinema	Traditional		May 19, 2026 (Cannes); October 14, 2026 (France)	89 minutes
The Irregular at Magic High School: The Movie – Yotsuba Succession Arc	Japan	Jimmy Stone	Eight Bit	Traditional		May 8, 2026	103 minutes
Jasmine & Jambo	Spain	Silvia Cortés	Teidees Audiovisual	Flash animation		December 11, 2026	80 minutes
Jim Queen	France; Belgium	Nicolas Athane; Marco Nguyen	Bobbypills uMedia	Flash animation		May 18, 2026 (Cannes); June 17, 2026 (France)	90 minutes
Jinsei	Japan	Ryuya Suzuki	Rock'n Roll Mountain; Greenwich Entertainment	Traditional		June 5, 2026 (United States)	93 minutes
The Journey With The Wish Fish	China		Huzhou Yoda Film Industry Co., Ltd.	Traditional		June 29, 2026	89 minutes
Julián	Ireland; Canada; Denmark; Luxembourg; United Kingdom	Louise Bagnall; Guillaume Lorin; Mark Mullery; Juliany Taveras	Cartoon Saloon; Aircraft Pictures; Melusine Productions; Sun Creature; Wychwood Pictures; Folivari; Crave; Guru Studios; BCP Asset Management; Viva Films	Traditional		June 23, 2026 (Annecy)	85 minutes
Killtube	Japan	Kazuaki Kuribayashi; Yutaka Uemura	Studio Dotou; Wachajack; Kassen	Traditional		June 2026 (Annecy)	90 minutes
Kiri and Lou Go Raaa!	New Zealand	Harry Sinclair; Antony Elworthy	Vendetta Films Ltd. CAKE	Computer		June 23, 2026 (Annecy International Animation Film Festival); August 8, 2026	61 minutes
Kūkai	China	Ye Yue	Beijing Tianguzhiyin Culture Media Co., Ltd.	Computer		July 30, 2026	97 minutes
Kusunoki no Bannin	Japan	Tomohiko Itō	A-1 Pictures; Psyde Kick Studio	Traditional		January 30, 2026	113 minutes
La Marca del Jaguar: El despertar del fuego	Spain	Víctor Mayorga	Origem Content; Ocelotl Company; Hecat	Traditional		July 26, 2026	91 minutes
La Venganza del Charro Negro	Mexico	Marvick Núñez	Ánima Estudios	Flash Animation		October 22, 2026	94 minutes
Labyrinth	Japan	Shōji Kawamori	Sanzigen	Computer		January 1, 2026	115 minutes
The Land of Sometimes	United Kingdom	Leon Joosen	Nottage Productions; Two Daughters Entertainment	Computer		October 30, 2025 (United Kingdom); January 18, 2026 (United States)	93 minutes
The Last Blossom	Japan; Australia; New Zealand	Baku Kinoshita	CLAP	Traditional		April 23, 2026 (Australia); August 30, 2026 (North America)	90 minutes
The Last Whale Singer	Germany; Czech Republic; Canada	Reza Memari	Telescope Animation; PFX; La Boîte à Fanny	Computer		September 28, 2025 (Schlingel); February 12, 2026 (Germany)	91 minutes
Light Pillar	China	Zao Xu	Fengduan Film Co., Ltd. La Fonte	Traditional; Computer		February 14, 2026 (Berlin International Film Festival); April 23, 2026 (Red Lotus Asian Film Festival); July 5, 2026 (Karlovy Vary International Film Festival)	90 minutes
The Little Mammoth	Russia	Alexander Voitinsky	Bazelevs Production	Computer		October 1, 2026	90 minutes
Long Long Night	South Korea	Youm Kyu-bock	GOOGGOOG; Studio EON; The Contents On; SnowballH	Computer		September 12, 2026 (Toronto International Film Festival); October 8, 2026 (Busan International Film Festival)	99 minutes
Lottie Dottie Chicken - The Movie; Galinha Pintadinha: O Filme	Brazil	Marcos Patrizzi Luporini; Juliano Prado	Bromelia Produções	Computer		October 1, 2026	90 minutes
Love Live! Hasunosora Girls' High School Idol Club Bloom Garden Party	Japan	Gō Kurosaki	Sublimation	Computer		May 8, 2026	75 minutes
Lucy Lost	France	Olivier Clert	Studio Xilam; Gao Shan Pictures	Computer		October 28, 2026	85 minutes
Lydia and the Mist Rider	Canada	Nancy Florence Savard; Emilie Rosas; Philippe Arseneau Bussières	10th Ave. Productions	Computer		February 20, 2026 (Canada)	80 minutes
Made in Abyss: Awakening Mystery	Japan	Masayuki Kojima	Kinema Citrus	Traditional		October 23, 2026	71 minutes
Maebashi Witches Emoemories: Blooming Witches	Japan	Junichi Yamamoto	Sunrise	Traditional		October 23, 2026	117 minutes
Magic Atlas	Singapore; China	Sun Xun	ShanghART Gallery; Embassy of the Republic of Austria; Trail Mix Media; Shuhua Fine Arts; Old Heaven Books; Pi Animation Studio	Traditional		August 13, 2026 (Locarno Film Festival); September 25, 2026 (Ottawa International Animation Festival); October 4, 2026 (Linoleum Contemporary Animation and Media Art Festival)	85 minutes
Mahaprabhu Jagannath	India	Shripad Warkhedkar	Ele Animation, Toonz Media Group	Traditional		September 4, 2026	104 minutes
Mars	United States	Sevan Najarian	Midnight Kids Studios Inc. Whitest Kids Films LLC.	Traditional		June 6, 2024 (Tribeca); March 13, 2026 (United States)	85 minutes
Mateo	United States	Ashley Hays Wright; Scout Wright	Wright Family Films; Wright Animation Studios	AI-generated		June 3, 2026	76 minutes
Milky Subway: The Galactic Limited Express: Local Train to the Theater	Japan	Yohei Kameyama	Shin-Ei Animation; Bit grooove promotion Bandai Namco Filmworks	Traditional		February 6, 2026	46 minutes
Minions & Monsters	United States	Pierre Coffin	Universal Pictures; Illumination	Computer		June 21, 2026 (Annecy); July 1, 2026 (United States)	90 minutes
The Misconceived	United States	James N. Kienitz Wilkins	Automatic Moving	Computer		January 31, 2026 (Rotterdam)	89 minutes
Mobile Suit Gundam Hathaway: The Sorcery of Nymph Circe	Japan	Shūkō Murase	Bandai Namco Filmworks	Traditional		January 30, 2026	108 minutes
Monkey Quest	Japan; United States	David N. Weiss; Stephanie Ma Stine; Takao Noguchi	Toei Animation; Sola Digital Arts	Computer		June 2026 (Annecy); 2027	99 minutes
Mononoke the Movie: The Curse of the Serpent	Japan	Kenji Nakamura; Tomoaki Koshida	Studio Kafka; EOTA	Traditional		May 29, 2026	87 minutes
Monster Mia	Austria; Germany; Spain	Verena Fels	ARX Anima; Arxlight Pictures; P!B!T! Films; M.A.R.K. 13; Ikiru Films	Computer		June 23, 2026 (Annecy International Animation Film Festival); October 9, 2026 (Theatrical)	81 minutes
Moonfish	United States; Italy	Daniel Zvereff	La Biennale di Venezia; Opah; Present Company; Cartuna; Lucky Accident Productions	Traditional		September 6, 2026 (Venice)	89 minutes
Motu Patlu and the Mystery of Nagmani	India	Dheeraj Berry	Nickelodeon	Computer		November 8, 2026	65 minutes
Motu Patlu in the World of Zombies	India	Dheeraj Berry	Nickelodeon	Computer		June 14, 2026	69 minutes
Motu Patlu Ka Goa Dhamaal	India	Dheeraj Berry	Nickelodeon	Computer		March 3, 2026	44 minutes
Mu-Ki-Ra	Colombia; Spain	Estefania Piñeres	Letrario; Abano Producións	Traditional		April 16, 2026	82 minutes
Mu Yi and the Handsome General	France	Julien Chheng	Studio La Cachette; Duetto mk2 Films; Gebeka Films	Traditional		June 22, 2026 (Annecy Festival); September 17, 2026 (Toronto International Film Festival); January 20, 2027	90 minutes
My Friend The Sun	Mexico; Brazil	Alejandra Pérez González	Fotosíntesis Media	Traditional		April 22, 2026 (Guadalajara International Film Festival); October 17, 2026 (BFI London Film Festival)	81 minutes
Nabard ba Kharchang	Iran	Maziar Mohammadi nezhad		AI-generated		July 22, 2026	88 minutes
The Neighborhood Family; La Familia del Barrio: La maldición del quinto partido	Mexico	Sergio "Teco" Lebrija; Ornella Antista	Videocine; F3 Media	Flash Animation		April 23, 2026	85 minutes
A New Dawn	Japan; France	Yoshitoshi Shinomiya	Asmik Ace; Miyu Productions; Studio Outtriger	Traditional		February 18, 2026 (Berlin); March 6, 2026 (Japan)	76 minutes
New Happy Dad and Son 7 & Magical Eye Animated Movie: The Chaotic 7th Day	China		Zhejiang Zhongnan Cartoon Co., Ltd. CCTV Animation Group Co., Ltd.	Computer		October 1, 2026	85 minutes
New Theatrical Movie Keroro Gunsō: Upon Revival, Immediately Facing the Threat of Earth's Destruction!	Japan	Fumitoshi Oizaki; Yūichi Fukuda	Kadokawa Corporation; Bandai Namco Filmworks	Traditional		June 26, 2026	109 minutes
A New Toy Story	United States	Alex Heerman; Monroe Robertson	The Asylum	AI-generated		June 12, 2026	78 minutes
Nick and the Jade Tree	Russia	Vage Sargsyan	Ori Animation; Paradise Production Center	Computer		December 24, 2026	90 minutes
Nine Mountain: Paraghost	South Korea	Lee Won-cheol	Jackstree Studio; Studio Animal	Computer		October 23, 2026 (Bucheon International Animation Festival)	94 minutes
Niu Lai	China	Xin Yumeng	Dalian Jingyuan Culture Film and Television Media	Computer		August 5, 2026	86 minutes
The Orbit of Minor Satellites	United States; Japan	Chris Sullivan	Creative Capital; New Deer	Mixed		June 21, 2026 (Annecy); September 23, 2026 (Ottawa)	117 minutes
Papaya	Brazil	Priscilla Kellen	Birdo Studio			October 11, 2025 (Rio); February 15, 2026 (Berlinale)	74 minutes
Paris ni Saku Étoile	Japan	Gorō Taniguchi	Arvo Animation	Traditional		March 13, 2026	119 minutes
Patlabor EZY	Japan	Yutaka Izubuchi	J.C.STAFF	Traditional		May 15, 2026 (File 1); August 14, 2026 (File 2); March 5, 2027 (File 3)	71 minutes
Paw Patrol: The Dino Movie	Canada	Cal Brunker	Paramount Pictures; Nickelodeon Movies; Spin Master Entertainment	Computer		August 14, 2026	88 minutes
Peppa Pig: Perfect Holiday 小猪佩奇:完美假期	China; United Kingdom	Liu Yuan; Ryan Crego	Shanghai Huace Film Co., Ltd. Hasbro Consumer Products Licensing Co., Ltd. Tianjin Maoyan Cultural Media Co., Ltd. China Film Co., Ltd. Zhejiang Publishing & Media Co., Ltd. Jiangxi Film Group Co., Ltd. Beijing Qiheye Culture Media Co., Ltd.	Computer		October 1, 2026	88 minutes
Pikkuli and Starlight Reindeer	Finland	Metsämarja Aittokoski; Antti Aittokoski	AittoFlow; Filmkompaniet	Computer		October 23, 2026	75 minutes
The Pout-Pout Fish	Australia; United States	Ricard Cussó; Rio Harrington	MIMO Studios; Like a Photon Creative; Macmillan Publishers	Computer		January 1, 2026 (Australia); March 20, 2026 (United States)	92 minutes
Prostokvashino	Russia	Sarik Andreasyan	Soyuzmultfilm; K.B.A; TNT; Gazprom-Media Holding	Computer; Live-action		January 1, 2026 (Russia)	105 minutes
Puella Magi Madoka Magica: Walpurgisnacht: Rising	Japan	Akiyuki Shinbo; Yukihiro Miyamoto	Shaft	Traditional		August 28, 2026	120 minutes
Quantum Supremacy	United States	Jesse Baget	Ruthless Studios	Computer		February 16, 2026	77 minutes
The Rainbow Fish	Germany	Florian Moch	Claussen+Putz Filmproduktion; StudioCanal; Zodiac Pictures	Computer		November 19, 2026	70 minutes
Rascal Does Not Dream of a Dear Friend	Japan	Sōichi Masui	CloverWorks	Traditional		October 16, 2026	118 minutes
Ray Gunn	United States	Brad Bird	Netflix; Skydance Animation	Computer		December 18, 2026	119 minutes
The Reunion Journey	China	Teng Ma	Beijing Enlight Pictures; China Film Group	AI-generated		February 28, 2026	94 minutes
The Ribbon Hero	Japan	Yuuki Igarashi	Outline; Twin Engine	Traditional		August 8, 2026	111 minutes
Rock Bottom; Gungo y los juegos cavernícolas	Mexico; Spain	Gabriel Riva Palacio Alatriste; Rodolfo Riva Palacio Alatriste	Huevocartoon Entertainment; 3Doubles Producciones; Odin's Eye Animation	Computer		September 3, 2026	88 minutes
Rogue Trooper	United Kingdom	Duncan Jones	Rebellion Developments; Liberty Films	Computer		June 22, 2026 (Annecy)	125 minutes
Running Man: Light & Shadow	South Korea	Yun Jun-sang	LOCUS Corporation	Computer		April 11, 2026	83 minutes
Santa’s Workshop	Norway	Rasmus A. Sivertsen; Mette Tange	Qvisten Animation	Computer		November 13, 2026	75 minutes
Sanxingdui: Future Past	China	Yueming	Boyue Starry Sky Blueprint (Shanghai) Film & Television Technology Co., Ltd.	AI-generated		October 23, 2026	100 minutes
Sardar Sarvai Papanna	India	Venkatesh Goud Lingampalli	VG Movie Makers	AI-generated		August 21, 2026	145 minutes
Savior Ship	Iran	Hadi Mohammadian	SkyFrame	Computer		August 26, 2026	95 minutes
Scotty	Germany	Mohammad Pirzadi	Benar Animation Studio	Computer		July 31, 2026	81 minutes
Seaper Powers: The Rescue	United States	Kim Cameron	Side FX Partners	Computer		May 6, 2026	75 minutes
Search Party: Where's PawPaw?	United States	Victoria Monai Richards	Faith Plus Works; The Harold Brothers; JBH Films	Computer; Live-action		November 13, 2026	102 minutes
Sekiro: No Defeat	Japan	Kenichi Kutsuna	Qzil.la	Traditional		September 4, 2026	107 minutes
Shaun the Sheep: The Beast of Mossy Bottom	United Kingdom; France	Steve Cox; Matthew Walker	Aardman Animations; Sky Cinema; StudioCanal	Stop-motion		September 18, 2026	80 minutes
The Sheep Detectives	United Kingdom; United States	Kyle Balda	Amazon MGM Studios; Metro-Goldwyn-Mayer; Working Title Films; Lord Miller Productions; Three Strange Angels Productions	Computer; Live-action		May 2, 2026 (Early Access Screenings); May 8, 2026 (United States)	109 minutes
Shiboyugi: Playing Death Games to Put Food on the Table – 44: Cloudy Beach	Japan	Souta Ueno	Studio Deen	Traditional		July 10, 2026	89 minutes
Shinbi's Haunted House: One More Summon 신비아파트 10주년 극장판: 한 번 더, 소환	South Korea	Byun Young-kyu	CJ Entertainment; Studio BAZOOKA	Traditional		January 14, 2026	87 minutes
The Shrew of Destiny	Poland; Bulgaria; Lithuania; Canada	Marcin Wasilewski; Jacek Rokosz	EGoFILM; GS Animation; Studio Zmei; Studio PRL; ArtShot; Mystic House; Paris Hendzel Studio; Wytwórnia Filmów Dokumentalnych i Fabularnych; Instytut Kultury Miejskiej w Gdań	Traditional		May 23, 2026 (Tarnowska Nagroda Filmowa)	75 minutes
Shuke and Beita: The Miniature Humans 舒克贝塔之微缩人类	China	Yaqi Zheng		Computer		January 24, 2026	85 minutes
The Son of a Bitch; O Filho da Puta	Brazil	Erica Maradona; Otto Guerra; Sávio Leite; Tania Anaya	Otto Desenhos Animados; Anaya	Traditional		June 9, 2026 (World Festival of Animated Film - Animafest Zagreb); June 22, 2026 (Annecy International Animation Film Festival); September 23, 2026 (Ottawa International Animation Festival)	90 minutes
Sound! Euphonium: The Final Movie	Japan	Tatsuya Ishihara; Taichi Ogawa	Kyoto Animation	Traditional		April 24, 2026 (Part 1); September 11, 2026 (Part 2)	120 minutes (Part 1); 127 minutes (Part 2)
Spinned; Jeníček a Mařenka: Strážci kouzel	United States; Cyprus	Alexej Cicilin	Magic Frame Animation; Creation Entertainment Media	Computer		March 19, 2026	96 minutes
Star Detective Precure! The Movie: The Mysterious Garden and a Secret Pair	Japan	Hanako Ueda	Toei Animation	Traditional		September 18, 2026	71 minutes
Steps	United States	Alyce Tzue; John Ripa	Netflix Animation Studios; Paper Kite Productions	Computer		June 2026 (Annecy); November 20, 2026 (United States)	102 minutes
A Story About Fire	China	Li Wenyu	Shanghai Animation Film Studio; Shanghai Film Group	Traditional		February 18, 2025 (Berlin International Film Festival); April 28, 2026 (China)	85 minutes
The Super Mario Galaxy Movie	United States; Japan	Aaron Horvath; Michael Jelenic	Universal Pictures; Illumination; Nintendo	Computer		March 28, 2026 (Minami-za); April 1, 2026 (United States)	98 minutes
A Super Progressive Movie	Australia	Sebastian Peart	Stepmates Studios	Flash animation		January 26, 2026	86 minutes
Super Wings: Journey to the Center of the World	China	Chao Zhang	Alpha Group Co., Ltd.	Computer		January 2, 2026	85 minutes
Swallowed Star The Movie - Battle on Primal Star	China	Shao Guanhua	Sparkly Key Animation Studio; Tencent Video	Computer		May 1, 2026	94 minutes
Swapped	United States	Nathan Greno	Netflix; Skydance Animation	Computer		May 1, 2026	98 minutes
Tad and the Magic Lamp; Tadeo Jones 4 y la lámpara maravillosa	Spain	Enrique Gato	Lightbox Animation Studios; Telecinco Cinema; Telefónica Studios; Ikiru Films	Computer		August 26, 2026	94 minutes
Takopi's Original Sin: Thank You, See You Tomorrow	Japan	Shinya Iino	Enishiya	Traditional		November 27, 2026	152 minutes
Talking Tom Heroes: Suddenly Super - on the Big Screen	United States	Alexandru Curilov	Outfit7 Limited	Computer		July 23, 2026	66 minutes
Tana	China	Zhao Ji; Keer Zhu	Warner Bros. China	Computer		June 23, 2026 (Annecy)	112 minutes
Tangles	United States; Canada	Leah Nelson	Monarch Media; Point Grey Pictures; Lylas Pictures; Giant Ant	Traditional		May 14, 2026 (Cannes)	102 minutes
That Time I Got Reincarnated as a Slime the Movie: Tears of the Azure Sea	Japan	Yasuhito Kikuchi	Eight Bit	Traditional		February 20, 2026	105 minutes
The Three Kingdoms Part 1: The Battle for Luoyang	China	Junwei Xie		Computer		July 10, 2026	137 minutes
To You in the Beyond	Japan	Junichi Wada	TMS Entertainment	Traditional		October 9, 2026	116 minutes
To Your Island	China	Zhou Haoran	Beijing Enlight Pictures; Chengdu Enlight Animation	Computer		August 7, 2026	119 minutes
Tom and Jerry: Forbidden Compass	United States	Gang Zhang	Warner Bros. Pictures; China Film Group; Original Force Animation; Origin Animation; Viva Pictures	Computer		September 6, 2026	104 minutes
Toy Story 5	United States	Andrew Stanton	Disney; Pixar Animation Studios	Computer		June 9, 2026 (Los Angeles); June 19, 2026 (United States)	102 minutes
Tummy Tom 3: Look Who's Visiting Tummy Tom!	Netherlands; Belgium	Joost Van Den Bosch; Erik Verkerk	BosBros; NTR; Ketnet; Incredible Film; Eyeworks; Phanta Animation; Ka-Ching Cartoons	Traditional		December 16, 2026	60 minutes
Unanswered//butterfly: Sword Art Online	Japan	Tadahiro “Tady” Yoshihira	Polygon Pictures; Bandai Namco Entertainment	Computer		July 10, 2026	110 minutes
Unstoppable	Norway	Martin Lund	Storm Films	Computer		February 6, 2026	80 minutes
Viana the Legend of the Golden Hearts	Portugal	Rodrigo Carvalho	Watermelon Productions	Computer		November 6, 2026	100 minutes
The Violinist	Singapore; Italy; Spain; Colombia	Raúl García; Ervin Han	Robot Playground Media; TV ON Producciones; Altri occhi Bombillo Amarillo; Mystic House Animation; Throne Inc. Select Entertainment; Little Green White; 108 Media; Infocomm Media Development Authority of Singapore; Inspidea Sdn Bhd; Valencian Institute of Culture	Traditional		June 22, 2026 (Annecy International Animation Film Festival); November 13, 2026 (Spain)	95 minutes
ViQueens	Norway; Germany	Harald Zwart	Sola Media; OPCM; Space Age Films; Zwart Arbeid; Gimpville AS; Vamonos Films; Rumba AS	Computer		December 26, 2026	87 minutes
Viva Carmen	Finland; France; Spain	Sébastien Laudenbach	Folivari; Pikkukala; La Garde Montante Films; Pikkukala Barcelona	Traditional		May 18, 2026 (Cannes Directors' Fortnight); June 22, 2026 (Annecy International Animation Film Festival); June 29, 2026 (La Rochelle International Film Festival); July 3, 2026 (Karlovy Vary International Film Festival); December 16, 2026 (Theatrical)	90 minutes
We Are Aliens	Japan	Kōhei Kadowaki	Toho Next	Traditional		September 25, 2026	117 minutes
Welcome to Dolly's House	Taiwan	Rady Fu; Tree Muta; Seven YCH	Deep Sky Object	Traditional		June 21, 2026 (Annecy)	85 minutes
Whale Shark Jack	Australia	Miranda Edmonds; Khrob Edmonds	Cottesloe Films; Southern Light Films; WSJ Productions	Computer; Live-action		April 2, 2026	85 minutes
When Mumbo Jumbo Grew Giant; Da Mumbo Jumbo blev kæmpestor	Denmark	Karsten Kiilerich	A. Film Production	Computer		January 29, 2026	83 minutes
Wildwood	United States	Travis Knight	Laika	Stop-motion		October 21, 2026 (BFI); October 23, 2026 (United States)	131 minutes
Winnipeg, the Seed of Hope Winnipeg, el barco de la esperanza	Argentina; Chile; Spain	Beñat Beitia; Elio Quiroga	Dibulitoon Studio; El Otro Film; La Ballesta; Malabar	Traditional		June 2026 (Shanghai); July 10, 2026 (Spain)	77–78 minutes
Winter in Prostokvashino	Russia	Sarik Andreasyan	Soyuzmultfilm; K.B.A; TNT; Gazprom-Media Holding; Cinema Atmosphere	Computer; Live-action		December 17, 2026	90 minutes
Witch on the Holy Night	Japan	Masashi Takeuchi	Ufotable	Traditional		November 20, 2026	125 minutes
Yagoat	Kuwait	Ahmed Manai	Animx Studio	2D digital animation		April 9, 2026	83 minutes
You, Fireworks, and Our Promise	Japan	Kei Suzuki	SynergySP; The Answer Studio; Shin-Ei Animation	Traditional		July 17, 2026	96 minutes
Yugly	France; Belgium	Jérémie Degruson; Yanis Belaid	nWave Pictures; Octopolis	Computer		October 14, 2026	81 minutes
Zsazsa Zaturnnah	Philippines; France	Avid Liongoren	Rocketsheep Studio; Ghosts City Films	Traditional		June 22, 2026 (Annecy)	80 minutes

== Highest-grossing animated films ==
The following is a list of the 10 highest-grossing animated feature films first released in 2026.

† Background shading indicates films playing in the week commencing 20 November 2026 in theaters around the world.

Rank	Title	Distributor	Worldwide gross	Ref
1	Toy Story 5	Disney	$1,149,545,392	
2	The Super Mario Galaxy Movie	Universal	$1,013,295,263	
3	Minions & Monsters	Universal	$530,771,768	
4	Hoppers	Disney	$389,686,110	
5	All Wishes Come True!	Maoyan / CMC Pictures	$307,784,556	
6	Goat	Sony	$195,359,397	
7	Paw Patrol: The Dino Movie †	Paramount	$163,054,296	
8	Chiikawa the Movie: The Secret of the Mermaid Island †	Toho	$159,000,000	
9	Boonie Bears: The Hidden Protector	Fantawild	$154,000,000	
10	Detective Conan: Fallen Angel of the Highway	Toho	$97,567,906	

=== Box office records ===
- Doraemon: New Nobita and the Castle of the Undersea Devil has grossed $27,167,194 so far and was number one at the Japanese box office for the six weeks.
  - The Doraemon film series surpassed $1.9 billion with the release of Doraemon: New Nobita and the Castle of the Undersea Devil. It became the first anime film franchise to surpass $1.9 billion.
- Hoppers had the best opening weekend for an original animated film since Coco (2017).
- The Mario film series surpassed $2 billion with the release of The Super Mario Galaxy Movie. It became the first video game film franchise to surpass $2 billion.
  - Mario became the first animated film franchise with two films opening with more than $350 million worldwide.
  - The Super Mario Galaxy Movie has grossed $1 billion so far and was number one at the box office for the ten weeks. Additionally, it was the first film of 2026 to surpass $1 billion.
- The film has earned over ¥13 billion ($81 million USD), making it the highest-grossing among 2026 releases in Japan. It has now reached 27th place in the all-time domestic box office rankings, and ranks 4th among Detective Conan films, behind Detective Conan: Black Iron Submarine, Detective Conan: One-eyed Flashback and Detective Conan: The Million-dollar Pentagram.
- The Amazing Digital Circus: The Last Act grossed $36.4 million and was ranked number one on its opening day.
- The Toy Story film series surpassed $4 billion with the release of Toy Story 5.
  - Toy Story 5 became the highest-grossing film of the Toy Story franchise, surpassing Toy Story 4 (2019).
  - It became the 17th animated film to cross $1 billion and tenth-highest grossing animated film of all time.
- With the release of Minions & Monsters, the Despicable Me franchise became the first animated film franchise to surpass $6 billion.
- Chiikawa the Movie: The Secret of the Mermaid Island has grossed ¥2.24 billion from 1.51 million tickets sold in its opening weekend, debuting at first place in the Japanese box office.
  - The film had grossed over ¥10 billion, becoming the 21st Japanese anime film to surpass ¥10 billion at the box office.
  - As of November 1, the film has grossed ¥18.6 billion from 12.8 million tickets sold.
  - It has grossed NT$173.9 million in Taiwan, HK$25.8 million in Hong Kong, US$172,990 in Indonesia, 24.2 billion đồng in Vietnam, and US$20.1 million in South Korea.
- All Wishes Come True! was grossed $278 million, the total box-office revenue from previews and pre-sales exceeded ¥20 million (US$2.95 million).
- Paw Patrol: The Dino Movie has grossed $53 million in the United States and Canada, and $102 million in other territories, for a worldwide total of $155 million. It was produced on a budget of $40 million.
- Goat grossed $103 million in the United States and Canada, and $92 million in other territories, for a worldwide total of $195 million.
  - In its second weekend, Goat finished first with $17.2 million, dethroning Wuthering Heights. The film then made $12 million in its third weekend, finishing in second place to Scream 7.
- The Cat in the Hat has grossed $20 million in the United States and Canada, and $10 million in other territories, for a worldwide total of $30 million..
  - In the United States and Canada, The Cat in the Hat made $1 million from Thursday night previews, and went on to debut at $20 million, finishing in second at the box office.
- Forgotten Island has grossed $37.7 million in the United States and Canada, and $38.3 million in other territories, for a worldwide total of $76 million.
  - Forgotten Island was released alongside Primetime, Heart of the Beast, and Avengers Endgame: Encore, and was projected to gross $15–17 million from 3,548 theaters in its opening weekend.
  - Forgotten Island made $4.3 million on its opening day, and went on to debut to $12.8 million, finishing in fifth place.
  - The film finished in sixth place in the next two weekends, grossing $7.2 million and $4.3 million, respectively.

== See also ==
- List of animated television series of 2026
