= IHN =

IHN may refer to:

- InterCommunity Health Network, coordinated care organization in Oregon, United States
- IHN, abbreviation for inositol hexanicotinate, dietary supplement of Vitamin B3
- Infectious hematopoietic necrosis, disease caused by Infectious hematopoietic necrosis virus
- IHN, IATA airport code for Qishn Airport, an airport in Yemen
- IHN, abbreviation for the Honduran Institute of Tourism, organization that promoted the 2026 film Copán La Leyenda
- Individual Happiness Now, theory by New Zealand writer Len Lye
- Indian Hill New, building complex of Bell Labs
- Institute of History of Nicaragua, institute of Central American University, Managua
- In His Name, engraving on International Order of the King's Daughters and Sons insignia
- Interfaith Hospitality Network, network of American non-profit Family Promise
- IHN, stock code for Ikh Nuur, a company listed on the Mongolian Stock Exchange

== See also ==
- Ihn (disambiguation)
