= Tomasz Samojlik =

Biologist and cartoonist

- Born: 1978 (age 47–48); Hajnówka, Poland
- Education: Habilitation: 2020, Białystok University in Białystok; PhD: 2007, Jagiellonian University in Kraków; MSc: 2002, Maria Curie-Skłodowska University in Lublin
- Occupations: Cartoonist; writer; scientist
- Website: tomaszsamojlik.pl/en

Tomasz Samojlik (Polish pronunciation: [tɔ.maʂ samɔklik]; born 1978) is a scientist, a biologist and an environmental historian. In his research he focuses mainly on the history of fires and their role in shaping the Białowieża Primeval Forest's environment, the role of livestock grazing in modifying woodlands of the Białowieża Forest in the last five centuries, and the environmental history of the Białowieża Forest in the 19th and 20th centuries.

He is also a successful author of comic books and books addressed to a wide audience but mostly intended for youth. Samojlik has been using his scientific work to popularize knowledge about the natural environment and its inhabitants, and history of the Białowieża Forest.

== Life ==
Samojlik studied in Poland, first at the Maria Curie-Skłodowska University in Lublin, Inter-faculty European Study where he received Master of Science in 2002. He continued his education at the Jagiellonian University, Kraków, Faculty of Biology and Earth Sciences, where he received his PhD in Sciences in 2007. His PhD thesis was titled "Anthropogenic Landscape Change in the Białowieża Primeval Forest till the End of XVIII century". Its foundation constituted the results of the first stage of his study on human interactions from 500 BC to 1800 AD with the Białowieża Primeval Forest and determining their impact on the ecosystem.

In 2020 Samojlik earned a postdoctoral degree (habilitation) in biological sciences in the Białystok University in Białystok, Poland. His thesis was titled “Wpływ XIX-wiecznej gospodarki leśnej na stan lasów i populacji dzikich zwierząt Puszczy Białowieskiej” [“The influence of XIX century’s forest management on the forest shape and wild animals population of the Białowieża Forest”].

Since 2002, Samojlik has been working at The Mammal Research Institute, Polish Academy of Sciences (MRI PAS) in the Białowieża National Park, Poland. Samojlik holds an Associate Professor (Adjunct in Polish) position in the Population Ecology Unit of the institute.

As a scientist, Samojlik coordinates European Union projects and makes contributions to the novel field of research, environmental history, especially human impact on the Białowieża Forest. His research also focuses on the history of fires and the role of livestock which among others impact the environment of the Białowieża Forest. The history and the contemporary pattern of habitat use and diet of the European bison that live in the Białowieża Forest is one of his main scientific areas of interest.

Samojlik works as a scientist, but he also draws comics and writes children's books. He is a fruitful author of comic books and books addressed to a wide audience but mostly intended for youth. He decided to be a comic book artist when he was six years old.

He was drawing amateur comics/illustrated stories during his childhood. However, even though at the age of thirteen he had his paid cartoon debut in a local newspaper, “Kurier Podlaski” ["Podlasie press"], he did not believe in his talent. In high school, he realized that the cartoonist profession did not exist at that time, and that he needs to pick a real career. He was not admitted to studying law, so he studied history and European Studies in Lublin instead and then, he started working in MRI PAS.

Besides science and literature, Samojlik is also known because of the adaptations of his work. Samojlik is also a creator and illustrator of games. Samojlik sporadically creates posters, post cards, illustrations to newspaper and magazines articles, even for scientific works of his collaborators.

Samojlik lives close to the Białowieża Forest with his wife and two children. He often refers to his children as his inspiration and the first critics of his work.

== Works ==
Samojlik is an author of more than 50 articles in scientific journals, 7 books, 28 book chapters, and 59 popular articles. He published in English, French and Belarusian, numerous scientific articles, book chapters and books, also in collaboration with his peers. His scientific publications were cited about 600 times (as 2021) according to researchgate.

Samojlik is also an author of various graphic novels including the Shrew Saga (Saga o Ryjówce): The Shrew of Destiny (Ryjówka przeznaczenia), The Mink of Extinction (Norka zagłady), and The Return of the Cilia (Powrót rzęsorka) published in 2012, 2013, and 2015 respectively by Kultura Gniewu, as well as trilogy on woodpeckers from the Białowieża Forest called Dead Forest (Umarły las), Undead Forest (Nieumarły las), and The Call of the Carrion (Zew padliny) co-created with Adam Wajrak and published by Agora in 2016, 2017, and 2018 respectively.

He also authored numerous children's books about nature including the Pompik the European Bison (Żubr Pompik) series published by Media Rodzina since 2016 that consists of more than 20 titles, Ambaras about the wolf family (illustrated by Elżbieta Wasiuczyńska) published by Agora in 2018, Tarmosia about badgers (illustrated by Ania Grzyb) published by Agora in 2021, and Bercia and Orson about adventures of little bears (illustrated by Elżbieta Wasiuczyńska) published by Agora in 2021.

Samojlik is also an illustrator of books, games and posters. His works include illustrations to books from the Dad series: Dad, Why is it? (Tato, a dlaczego?), Dad, Explain this… (Tato, a po co?), Dad, It’s Nature time! (Z tatą w przyrodę), In search of Dinosaurs with Dad (Z tatą na dinozaury) authored by Wojciech Mikołuszko published by Multico in 2010, 2015 and 2017, and Are Fledges Flightless Birds and Other Secrets of Birds (Czy podloty to nieloty? I inne tajemnice ptaków) authored by Andrzej Kruszewicz, published by Multico in 2018.

=== Adaptations of his works ===
==== Theater/radio theater ====
- Pompik The Bison (play)
- The Shrew of Destiny (radio theater)

==== Movie/TV Show ====
- Pompik The Bison (TV Show)
- The Shrew of Destiny (Movie)

=== International editions ===
- The Last Bison – English Find this book online
- Forest Beekeeper and a Treasure of Pushcha - English (ISBN 0-9929082-0-5), Belarusian, Czech
- Pikot wants to be discovered (leporello, accordion book) – Belarusian, Chinese
- The Wutcher – English
- Wow! Nature revealed! - Chinese, Korean, Russian, Czech, Slovak
- With Dad Series – Chinese
- Body, how it works? – Chinese
- Human, how does it work? – Chinese

== Awards ==
Samojlik has received numerous awards for his scientific work and popularization of science in books and comic books.

- The PAN "Golden Mind – Master of Popularization of Knowledge", 2007.
- An Arthur Rojszczak prize, given to him by the Club of the Scholarship Holders Foundation, Polish Science 2010.
- The Science Popularizer Award from the Ministry of Science and Higher Education and the Science & Scholarship in Poland, 2012, VII Edition.
- The Polish Society of Comics Award, 2012, in the category "Best Story Writer" for the graphic novel The Shrew of Destiny.
- Evidence of Open Mind Award, in the eight plebiscite of the newspaper Gazeta Wyborcza for introducing a European bison and a shrew in his comics/graphic novels, 2014.
- An award in a plebiscite of the reader blog awarding youth literature "Lokomotywa" ["The Steam Train"], 2018, in the category comics and graphic novels, for the comic The Shrews' Winter.
- The Podlaskan Year's Brand Award, category "Culture", for "Pompik the European Bison", 2020

== Public appearances ==
=== Scientific conferences ===
Samojlik as a scientist is very active internationally. He frequently takes part in international scientific conferences held face-to-face and online, where he does not only present the results of his work but also works as member of scientific committees. He gives talks on the history of science, forest archaeology, environmental history, European forests, and Białowieża Forest.

=== Book fairs, literature festival appearances, presentations and workshops ===
Samojlik has been present at various book fairs, comic book fairs and intergenerational literature festivals organized virtually and in different Polish cities throughout the years. Additionally, Samojlik enjoys meeting with children. He is frequently invited to talk about his comic books, their characters, and the environment they live in. He has been visiting schools, daycares, and libraries where readers of his books can enjoy listening to his presentations. Furthermore, he also hosts the workshops where he shares his drawing passion, provides drawing tips, and gives his audience an opportunity to try their hand at cartooning.

=== Interviews ===
There have been a lot of interviews with Samojlik, both online and face-to-face, for example:

- The Białowieża Forest and "Pompik the Bison" with Tomasz Samojlik, The Slavic Connexion (September 4, 2020)
- CYBERspotkania – książka to przyszłość! - Spotkanie on-line z Tomaszem Samojlikiem, Gminna Biblioteka Publiczna w Wielkiej Wsi (May 24, 2021)
- Spotkanie z Tomaszem Samojlikiem, autorem cyklu o żubrze Pompiku, Cała Polska czyta dzieciom (June 21, 2021)
