= The Super Mario Galaxy Movie =

2026 American animated film

- Theatrical release poster
- Directed by: Aaron Horvath; Michael Jelenic
- Written by: Matthew Fogel
- Produced by: Chris Meledandri; Shigeru Miyamoto
- Starring: Chris Pratt; Anya Taylor-Joy; Charlie Day; Jack Black; Keegan-Michael Key; Benny Safdie; Donald Glover; Brie Larson
- Edited by: Eric Osmond
- Music by: Brian Tyler
- Production companies: Illumination; Nintendo
- Distributed by: Universal Pictures
- Release dates: March 28, 2026 (Minami-za); April 1, 2026 (United States)
- Running time: 98 minutes
- Country: United States
- Language: English
- Budget: $110 million
- Box office: $1.013 billion

The Super Mario Galaxy Movie is a 2026 American animated adventure comedy film based on Nintendo's Mario video game franchise, created by Shigeru Miyamoto. Directed by Aaron Horvath and Michael Jelenic and written by Matthew Fogel, it is the sequel to The Super Mario Bros. Movie (2023). Chris Pratt, Anya Taylor-Joy, Charlie Day, Jack Black and Keegan-Michael Key reprise their roles from the first film, with Benny Safdie, Donald Glover, Glen Powell, and Brie Larson joining the cast. It was produced by Universal Pictures, Illumination and Nintendo. In the film, Mario, Luigi and their friends adventure into outer space, where they face off against Bowser and his son, Bowser Jr. (Safdie) to find and save Rosalina (Larson).

Nintendo's president Shuntaro Furukawa stated in May 2021 that Nintendo was interested in producing more animated films based on its properties if the then-untitled Mario film was successful. Illumination CEO and producer Chris Meledandri was asked about the possibility of a sequel to The Super Mario Bros. Movie before the film's release in April 2023. Following its box office success, a new animated Mario film was announced to be in development at Illumination in March 2024, with Horvath and Jelenic returning as directors and Fogel as screenwriter. The film takes inspiration from Mario video games such as Super Mario Galaxy (2007) and Super Mario Galaxy 2 (2010), among other Nintendo games such as the Star Fox series.

The Super Mario Galaxy Movie premiered at Minami-za in Kyoto on March 28, 2026, and was theatrically released in the United States on April 1 by Universal Pictures. The critical response has been variously described as mixed (Note: Attributed to multiple sources:) or negative (Note: Attributed to multiple sources:) but received positive reviews by audiences. Nevertheless, it was a commercial success, grossing $1.013 billion worldwide on a $110 million budget, becoming the fifth-highest-grossing film of 2026 and the second-highest-grossing video game film of all time, only behind its predecessor.

== Plot ==
Rosalina, the adoptive mother of the Lumas living in the Comet Observatory, is captured by a kidnapper named Bowser Jr., who plots to steal her powers to fuel a universe-destroying cannon in his father's honor, who was defeated by Mario and Luigi and shrunken by Princess Peach. (Note: As depicted in The Super Mario Bros. Movie (2023)) Meanwhile, Mario and Luigi are called to inspect a disturbance in the Tostarena Town, where they discover and befriend the dinosaur Yoshi, who had hatched in Brooklyn and was pursued back to his home world after accidentally breaking a dinosaur skeleton in a museum. A Luma crash-lands in the Mushroom Kingdom, asking Peach and Toad to help her find Rosalina. In their absence, Mario, Luigi, and Yoshi protect the Mushroom Kingdom and attempt to rehabilitate Bowser.

Bowser Jr. lifts Peach's castle into space in an attempt to free his father, but his battle against the brothers and Yoshi causes his spaceship to drop and destroy the Peach's Castle by crash-landing into the Honeyhive Galaxy. Bowser goads Mario into attacking him, thus unshrinking him, but offers to take their place for damaging the fields in exchange for the brothers and Yoshi getting transported to the Gateway Galaxy. Bowser is later rescued by his son, whom he had sent to boarding school years ago. In the Gateway Galaxy, Toad's backpack is stolen by monkey thief Ukiki, who takes it to a hidden casino. Peach interrogates Wart, the casino's owner, to force him to reveal Rosalina's location, the Space Junk Galaxy, but he subsequently alerts the Bowsers about Peach.

Mario, Luigi, and Yoshi reunite with Peach and Toad, who have hired Star Fox pilot Fox McCloud to transport the group. Fox's Arwing spaceship crash-lands into Fossil Falls after an attack from Bowser and his son, who transforms Mario and Luigi into babies with a Super Scope. Despite Bowser double-crossing the brothers, he ultimately returns to his villainous ways to mend his relationship with his son. Yoshi finds the Super Scope, rescues the brothers from a Tyrannosaurus, and restores them to their proper ages. Luigi alerts the Lumas, who pick them up in the Comet Observatory. There, Peach learns that she has the same powers as Rosalina, her long-lost older sister. When they touch hands, they can summon the power of the cosmos. She and Rosalina were made from stardust, and Rosalina sent a young Peach to the Mushroom Kingdom via a warp pipe to defend her from the villainous forces.

Fox, Toad, and the Lumas pilot the Comet Observatory to send the other four to the newly-made Planet Bowser. Mario and Peach confront a vengeful Bowser on a bridge as he openly reveals his grudge over his humiliating defeat and never intends on redeeming himself. Mario collapses the bridge, dropping Bowser into the lava moat below, but the latter survives as a skeletal form. Luigi and Yoshi assist Mario in defeating the Bowsers with power-ups, and when one of Bowser Jr.'s creations turns against him, Mario destroys it to save Bowser Jr.'s life. Peach revives a dying Rosalina, and they use their power to terraform Planet Bowser into a new world. Returning to the Mushroom Kingdom, Mario, Luigi, and Yoshi help the sisters, Toads, and Lumas rebuild Peach's castle. Peach kisses Mario, much to his delight. Fox sends the Bowsers to prison before heading home to his own world. Back at the Gateway Galaxy, Princess Daisy stops Ukiki from committing another robbery.

== Voice cast ==
- Chris Pratt as Mario, an Italian-American plumber originally from Brooklyn
- Anya Taylor-Joy as Princess Peach, the ruler of the Mushroom Kingdom, and Rosalina's long-lost younger sister
- Charlie Day as Luigi, Mario's younger twin brother
- Jack Black as Bowser, the King of the Koopas and Mario's arch-nemesis
- Keegan-Michael Key as Toad, an anthropomorphic mushroom from the Mushroom Kingdom
- Benny Safdie as Bowser Jr., Bowser's son, the Prince of the Koopas, and Rosalina's kidnapper
- Donald Glover as Yoshi, a friendly green dinosaur who befriends Mario and Luigi
- Glen Powell as Fox McCloud, a red fox mercenary space pilot from another galaxy
- Brie Larson as Rosalina, a princess from outer space, the adoptive mother of the Lumas and Peach's long-lost older sister

Additional cast members include Luis Guzmán as Wart, a frog crime boss and owner of the Gateway Galaxy's casino, and Issa Rae as the Honey Queen, a large queen bee who rules the Honeyhive Galaxy. Kevin Michael Richardson reprises his voice role as Kamek, a Magikoopa serving as Bowser's advisor and informant. Eric Bauza reprises his role as the blue Toad general in Peach's royal court, in one of his final voice performances before his death in October 2026. Juliet Jelenic, daughter of co-director Michael Jelenic, reprises her role as Lumalee, a nihilistic blue Luma who was held prisoner by Bowser in the previous film and now works as a prison guard where the Bowsers are sent by Fox. Roxana Ortega voices Ukiki, a monkey thief living in the Gateway Galaxy. Michael Jelenic's two other daughters, Pepper and Virginia Dare, collectively voice the Lumas, Rosalina's star-like adopted children. Head of story Ed Skudder voices R.O.B., a robot that works in the Gateway Galaxy.

== Production ==
=== Development ===
In May 2021, Nintendo president Shuntaro Furukawa said that Nintendo would be interested in producing more animated films based on its intellectual properties if the first Mario film was successful. The post-credits scene hinted at a potential sequel featuring Mario's dinosaur steed Yoshi. Jack Black expressed interest in Pedro Pascal being cast to voice Mario's self-declared arch-rival Wario in the sequel.

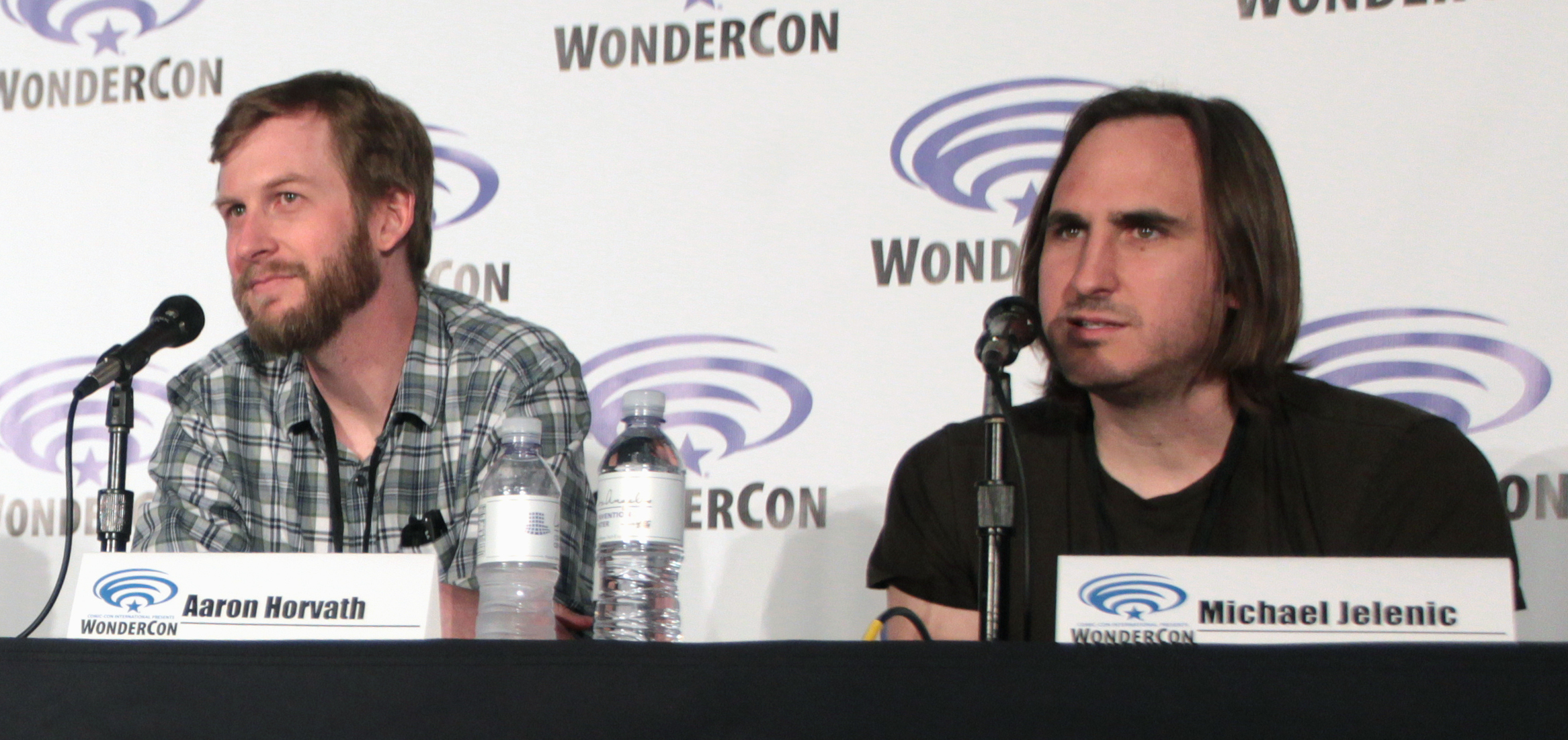
Aaron Horvath (left) and Michael Jelenic (right) returned to direct.

In April 2023, following the box office success, Nintendo stated that there would be more films based on their properties, though they did not confirm a Mario sequel. In June 2023, Chris Pratt said a sequel would be announced "soon", but with the caveat that the 2023 Writers Guild of America strike would have an effect on the production. In December 2023, Black expressed interest in the sequel being a musical titled Bowser's Revenge.

In March 2024, during a Mario Day presentation, Illumination CEO and producer Chris Meledandri and Mario creator Shigeru Miyamoto confirmed development of a new Mario film with Aaron Horvath and Michael Jelenic returning to direct and Matthew Fogel returning to write the screenplay. Meledandri said that Illumination's team was in the process of storyboarding and "developing set designs for new environments". In October 2024, Keegan-Michael Key said that the sequel would be "broader in scope" and feature "new folks and old favorites and some folks that [he thinks] are really deep cuts". Meledandri said that, while the games Super Mario Galaxy (2007) and Super Mario Galaxy 2 (2010) were the core inspiration, it would include "surprises for fans of every Mario era". According to Miyamoto, the sequel was originally planned to be a Yoshi movie, with Yoshi being in Brooklyn. The idea about Yoshi being in Brooklyn was later turned into a montage sequence in the final film. Miyamoto stated that he, Horvath, Jelenic and Meledandri felt that Princess Peach's portrayal as a "strong woman" in the first film "wasn't enough", so she was depicted as having worries, emotions, and relationship fluctuations with Mario to make her more relatable. Miyamoto also stated that the film's fast pacing was intentionally done to keep children and parents engaged.

=== Casting ===
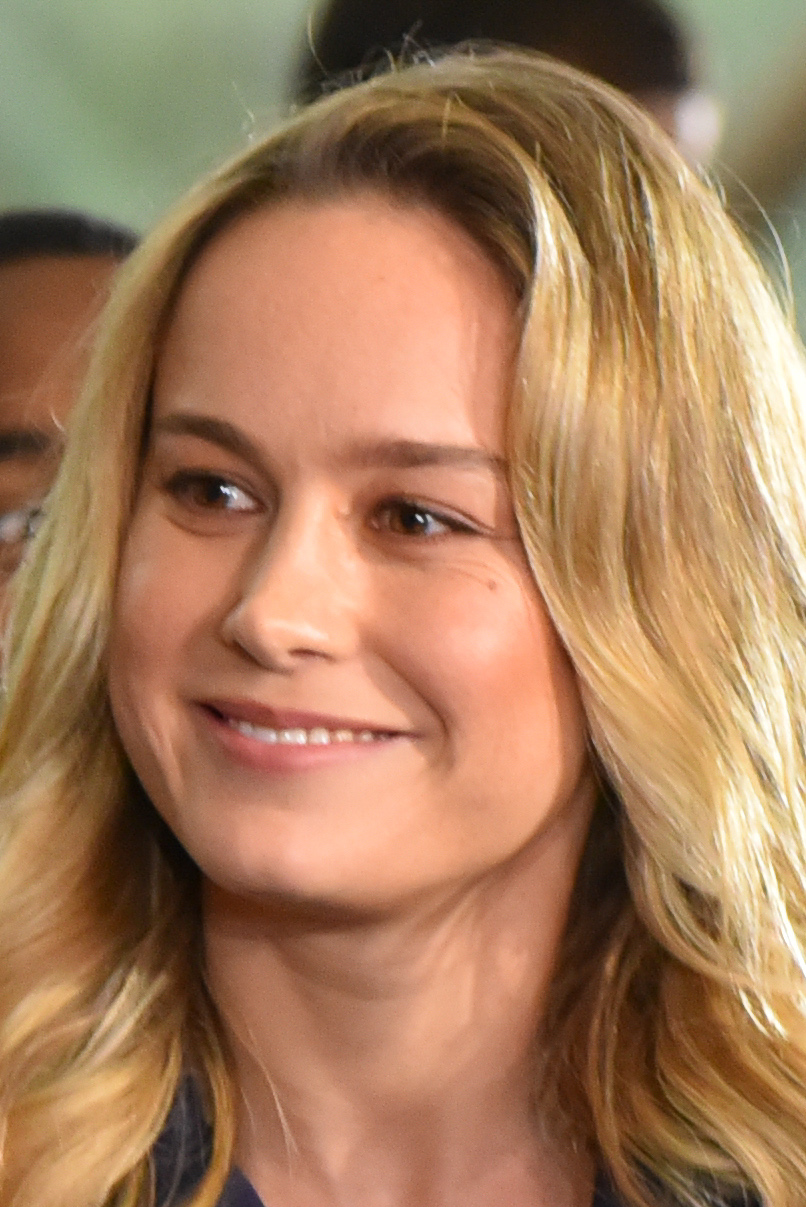
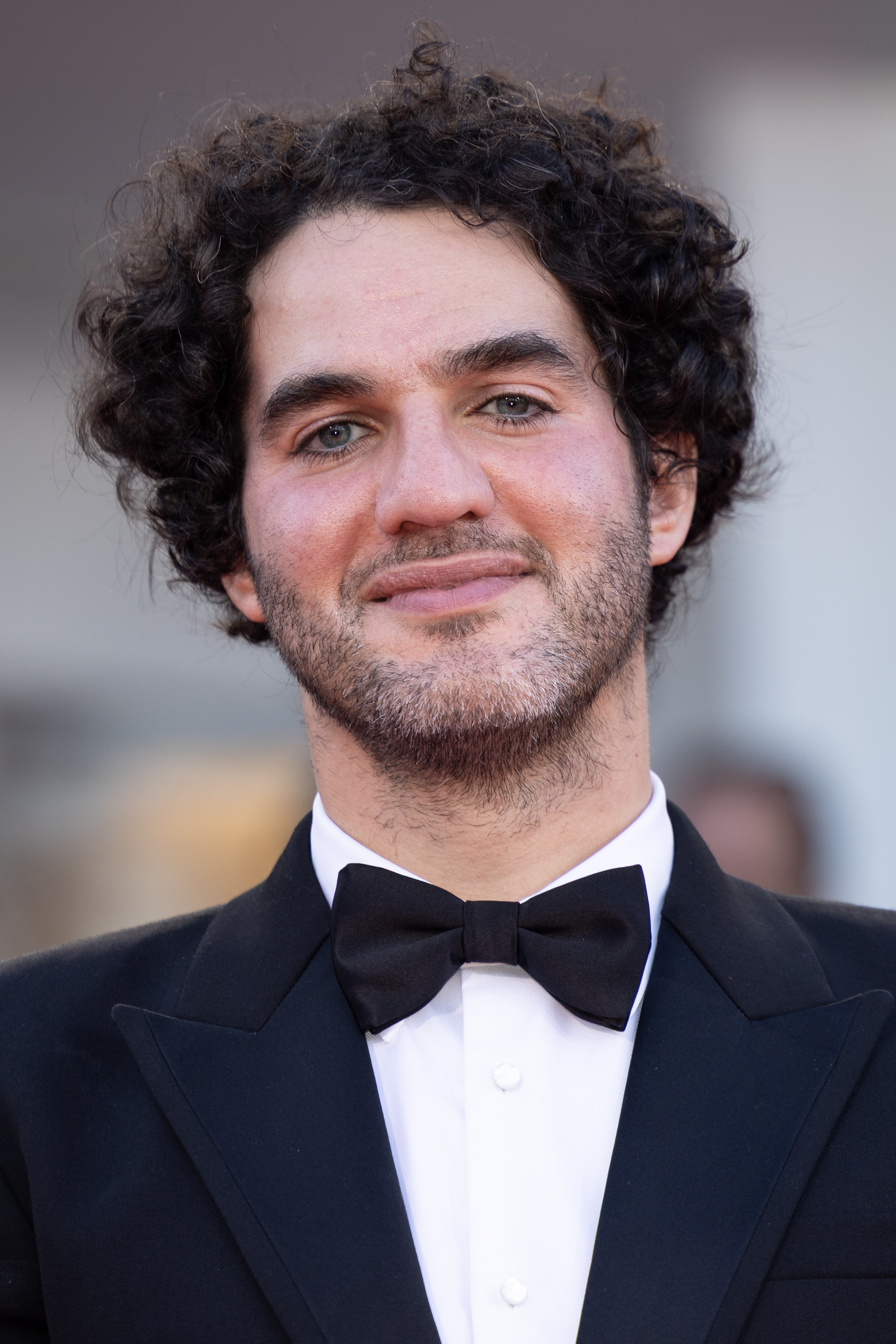
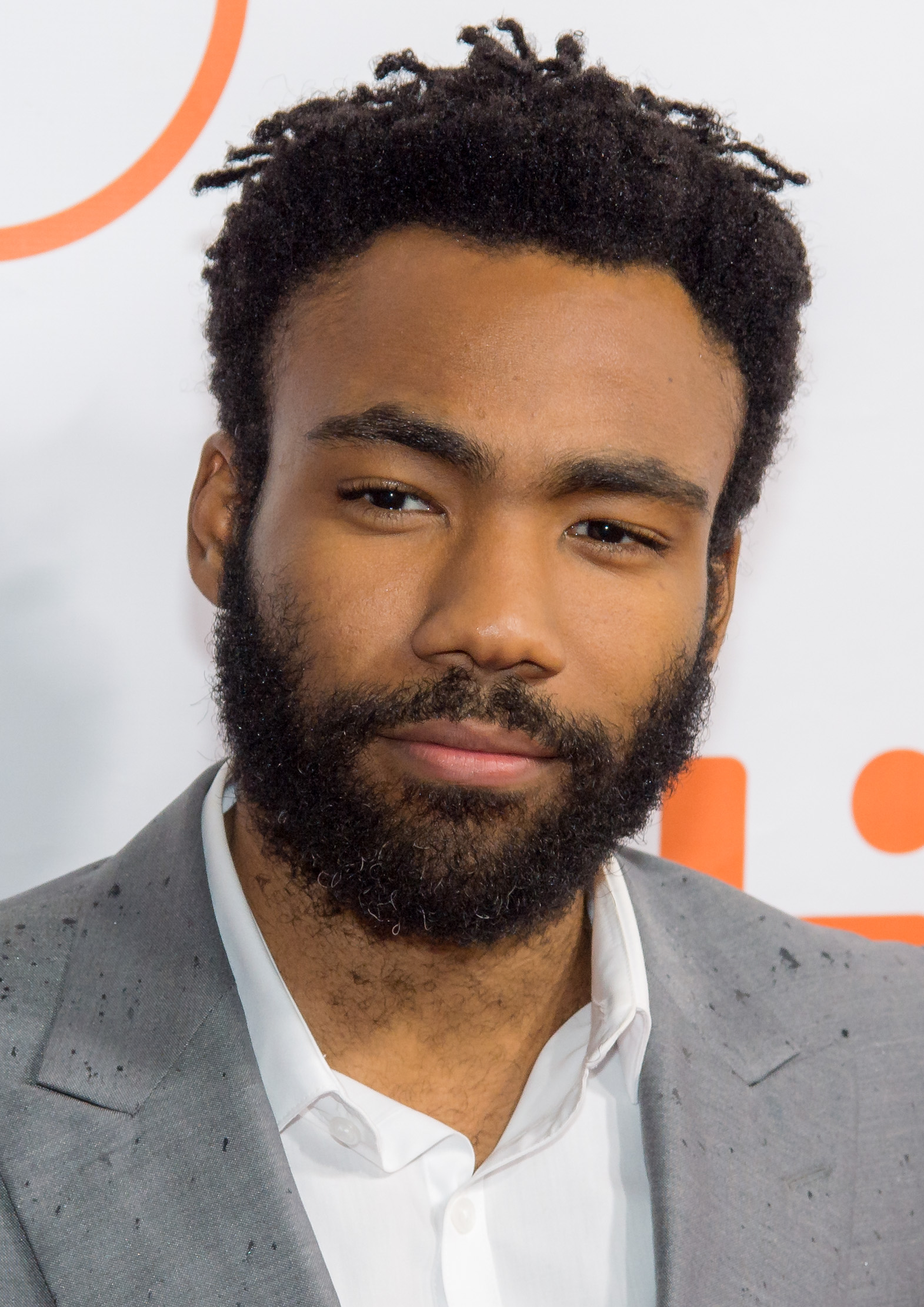
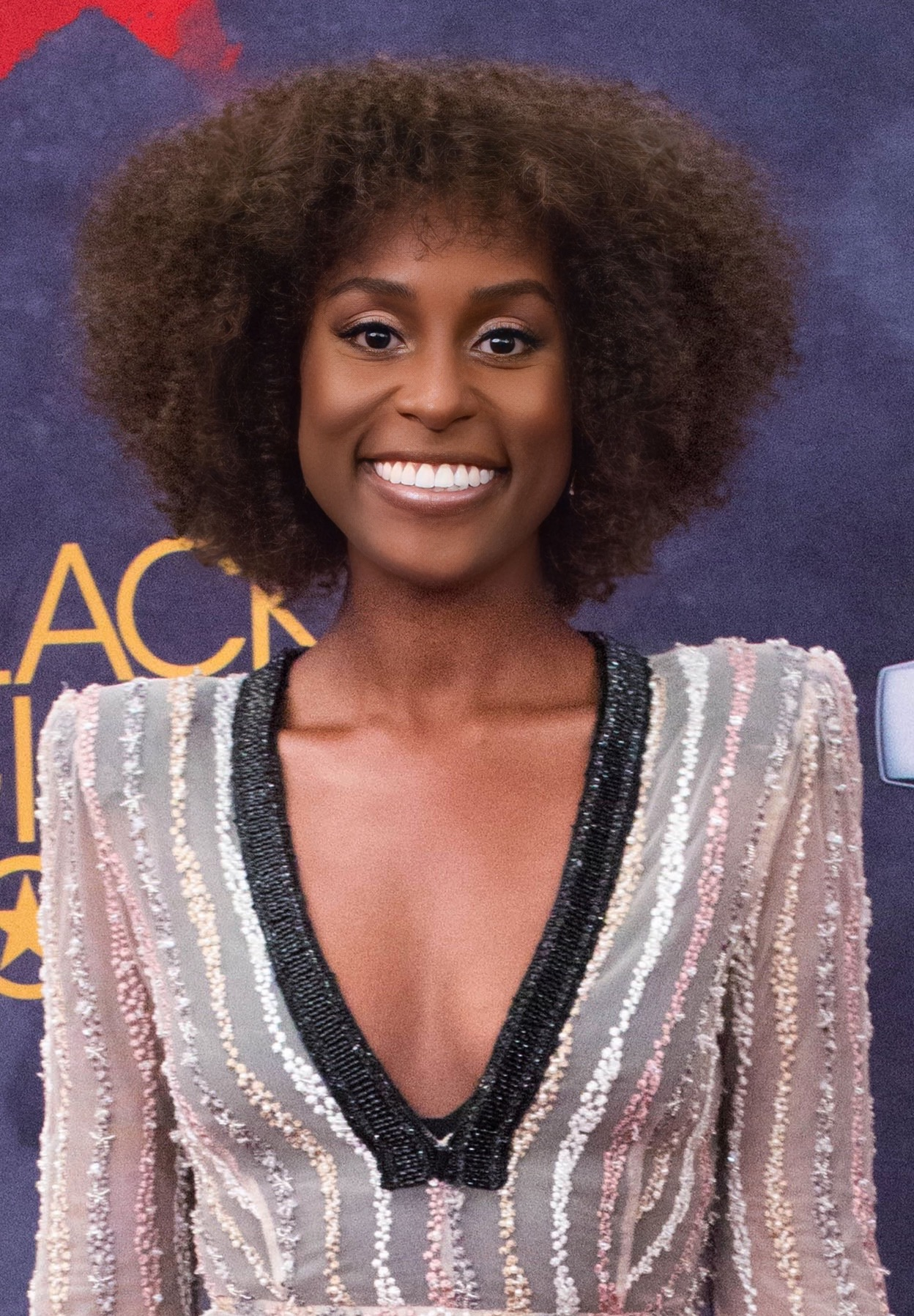
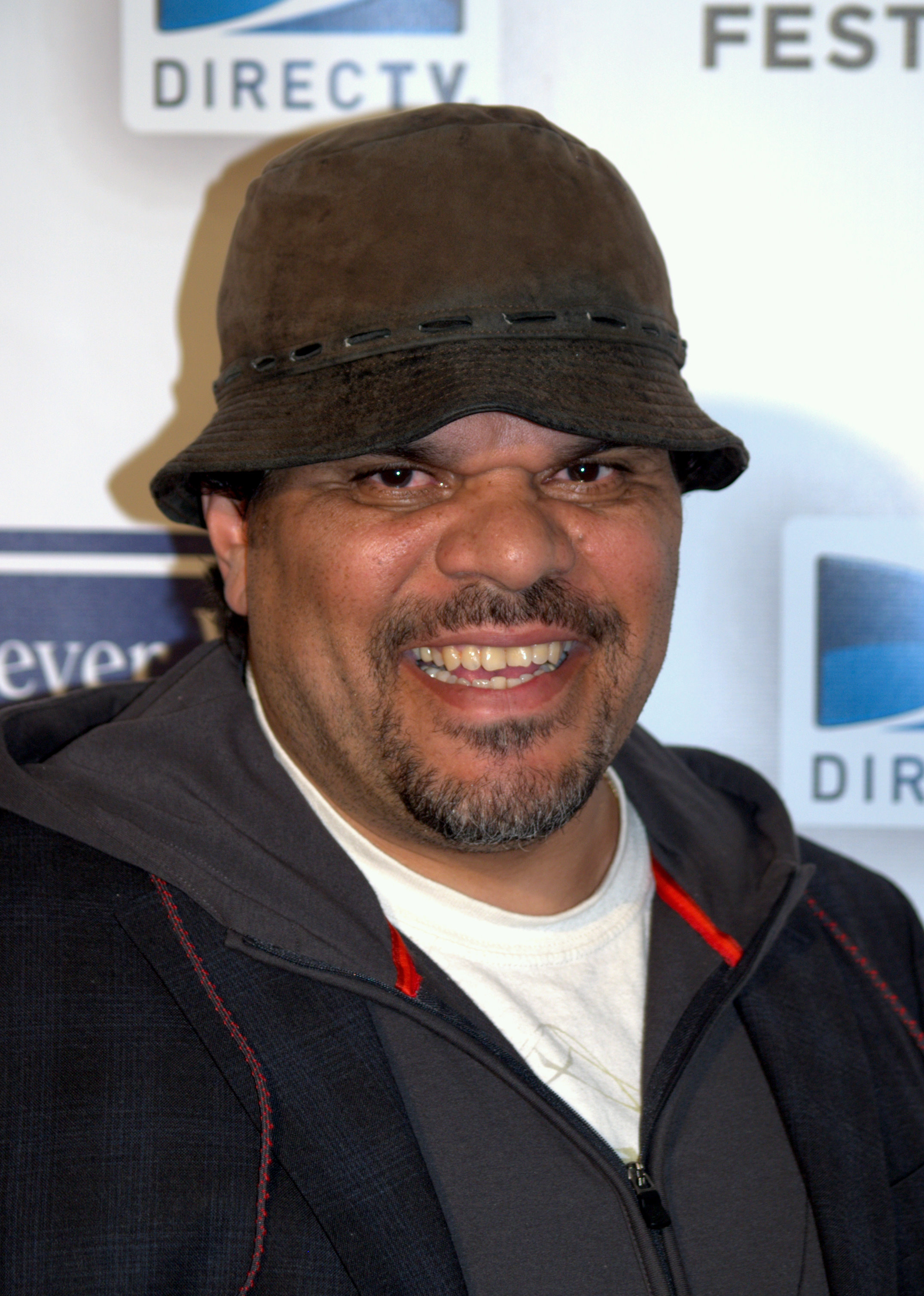
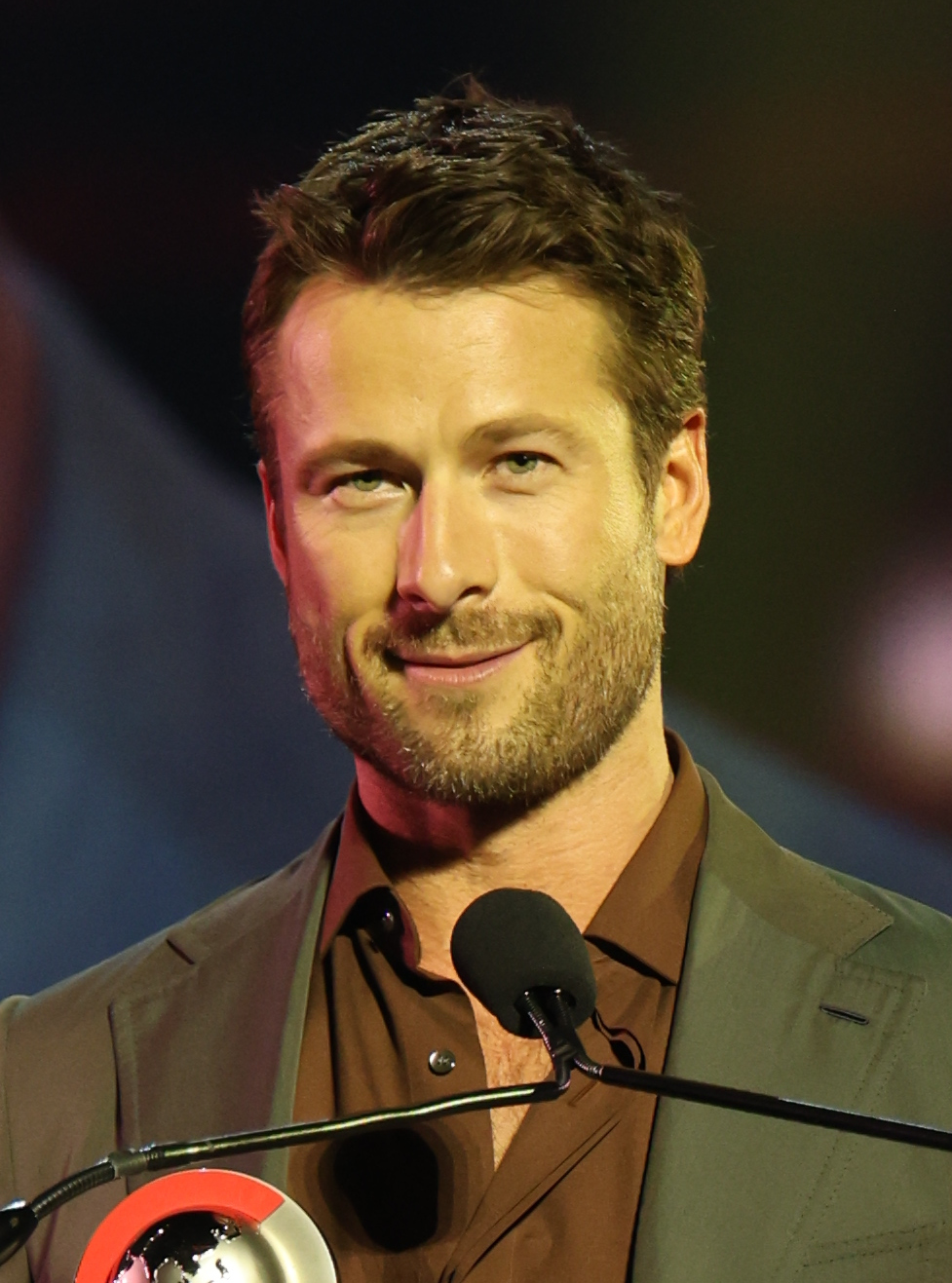
Top: Brie Larson, Benny Safdie, and Donald Glover joined as the respective voices of Rosalina, Bowser Jr. and Yoshi.
Bottom: Issa Rae, Luis Guzmán, and Glen Powell voice Honey Queen, Wart and Fox McCloud, respectively.

Nintendo announced the title The Super Mario Galaxy Movie in September 2025, during a Nintendo Direct presentation. Pratt, Anya Taylor-Joy, Charlie Day, Black, Key, and Kevin Michael Richardson were confirmed to reprise their roles from the previous film, with Brian Tyler returning to compose the score. Two months later, on November 12, a Nintendo Direct presentation for the film trailer was released, and Brie Larson and Benny Safdie were announced to have been cast as Rosalina and Bowser Jr., respectively. On March 9, 2026, with the release of the final trailer, it was revealed that Donald Glover, Issa Rae, and Luis Guzmán had joined the cast, with Glover voicing Yoshi in all dubbed versions of the film. For the Japanese dub, the actors were given freedom to improvise their characters' dialogue.

Days ahead of the release on March 27, 2026, Glen Powell was revealed to have joined the cast as the Star Fox protagonist, Fox McCloud. Powell and Glover both pitched themselves for their parts after the first film was released, with Powell particularly being passionate about leading a Star Fox film. Star Fox developer Argonaut Games felt proud upon seeing Fox's inclusion in the film, while character designer Takaya Imamura was "overwhelmed with emotion" and thanked Miyamoto for his inclusion. Miyamoto would later reveal in an interview with Famitsu that the inclusion of Fox McCloud and Yoshi in the movie encouraged development of a new Star Fox game and a new Yoshi game for the Nintendo Switch 2.

=== Animation and design ===
Like its predecessor, The Super Mario Galaxy Movie was animated by Illumination Studios Paris in Paris, France. Production was underway by March 2024, with animation finishing in November 2025. In January 2026, Meledandri confirmed that animation had been completed and post-production had begun. The scene where Fox explains his backstory was animated by Benjamin Faure.

== Music ==
On September 12, 2025, it was reported that Brian Tyler, who composed the score for The Super Mario Bros. Movie, would be returning to compose the score for the sequel. According to Tyler, he composed several pieces of the score for the movie from the hospital without telling the staff. The score is performed by a 70-piece orchestra and features arrangements of themes from the two Super Mario Galaxy games and other installments in the Super Mario series. The soundtrack was released on Back Lot Music and iam8bit on April 1, 2026, coinciding with the film's theatrical release.

== Release ==
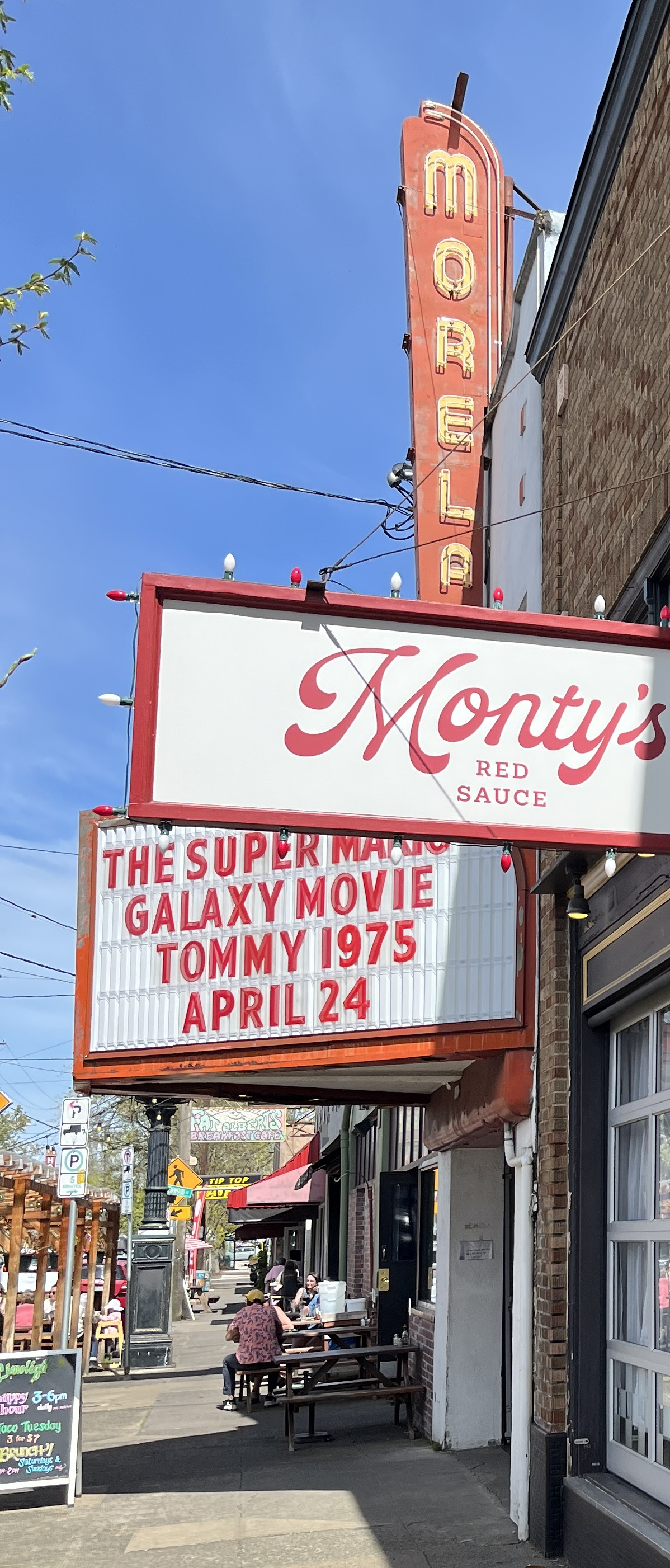
Marquee with the film's title at the Moreland Theater in Portland, Oregon, U.S.

=== Theatrical ===
The Super Mario Galaxy Movie was theatrically released in the United States on April 1, 2026, and in Japan on April 24, in RealD 3D and IMAX formats. It was originally scheduled to be released on April 3.

=== Home media ===
The Super Mario Galaxy Movie was released on video on demand on May 19, 2026. As part of Universal's long-term deal with Netflix for its animated films, the film is contracted to stream in the US on Peacock for the first four months of its pay-TV window, then move to Netflix for the next ten months, and then return to Peacock for four months. The film was released on 4K Ultra-HD Blu-ray, Blu-ray, and DVD on June 16, 2026.

== Reception ==
=== Box office ===
The Super Mario Galaxy Movie grossed $429.8 million in the United States and Canada, and $583.4 million in other territories, for a worldwide total of $1.013 billion. Produced on a budget of $110 million, the film is currently the fifth highest-grossing film of 2026 and the second highest-grossing animated film of the year. The film also set the record for the biggest global opening at the box office in 2026, the only animated film franchise with two films opening to over $350 million globally, the fifth-biggest global opening for an animated film of all time, the second-biggest global opening for an Illumination film, the second-biggest opening for a film based on a video game, and the fourth-biggest Easter three-day opening of all time. On June 7, 2026, the film crossed the $1 billion mark, becoming the first film of 2026, the 16th animated film overall, and the 61st film overall to cross this threshold. The film concluded its domestic theatrical run on July 2, 2026.

==== United States and Canada ====
The Super Mario Galaxy Movie made $34 million on its first day, outperforming its predecessor's $31.7 million, and earned a total of $122.1 million worldwide over its first two days of release. With a three-day opening of $131.7 million the film became the fourth-biggest Easter three-day opening of all time, behind The Super Mario Bros. Movie ($146.4 million), Furious 7 ($147.8 million), and Batman v Superman: Dawn of Justice ($166 million).

The film ended up debuting with $190.8 million, obtaining the fourth biggest five-day opening in the region, behind Moana 2 ($225.4 million in 2024), The Super Mario Bros. Movie ($204.6 million in 2023), and Transformers: Revenge of the Fallen ($200 million in 2009). The film has earned the highest Monday box office gross of 2026, at $16.8 million. In its second weekend, the film retained the top spot at the box office and made $68 million, a decline of 49%. The Super Mario Galaxy Movie once again topped the box office in its third weekend with $36.5 million. It was dethroned its fourth weekend by Michael and finished in second place with $20.6 million.

==== International ====
In its opening weekend from 80 markets, the film grossed $182.4 million, for a global debut of $372.6 million.

=== Critical response ===
On the review aggregator website Rotten Tomatoes, 42% of 224 critics' reviews are positive, with an average rating of 5.2/10. The website's consensus reads: "Packed with colorful world-building that's as frenetic as it is weightless, The Super Mario Galaxy Movie's visuals are often out of this world but the threadbare story ultimately loses its Milky Way." Metacritic, which uses a weighted average, assigned the film a score of 37 out of 100, based on 45 critics, indicating "generally unfavorable" reviews. Audiences polled by CinemaScore gave the film an average grade of "A−" on an A+ to F scale, down from the first film's "A", while those at PostTrak surveyed that 79% of audiences gave the film a positive review, with 62% saying they would "definitely recommend" it.

Glenn Garner of Deadline Hollywood gave the film a positive review writing, "The Super Mario Galaxy Movie is a fun sequel full of nostalgic references, all-star voices and epic animation, grounded by the father-son story of redemption for Bowser (Jack Black) and a sisterly origin story [sic] Princess Peach, both of which pave the way for more video game adaptation fun," while also praising the voice performances of Donald Glover and Glen Powell. Barry Hertz of The Globe and Mail stated: "...whereas a cosmic beast like Cthulhu or Azathoth at least possess all-knowing knowledge in addition to their sanity-breaking powers of terror, a horror like The Super Mario Galaxy Movie retains no vaguely redeeming qualities." In a one-and-a-half out of four review, Eli Friedberg of Slant Magazine said it was "an unpretentiously vapid cocktail of big-budget technical mastery and lack of artistic ambition. The visual language is divorced from reality and referent to the games; even Looney Tunes action is grounded in the real world—the better to subvert it." Tara Brady of The Irish Times said "the dynamic between Bowser and his son, and the Frozen-like sisterhood between Peach and Rosalina, are jettisoned as quickly as they are introduced. Subplots remain half-formed. New additions—especially Glen Powell's inexplicably underused Fox McCloud—barely register. The abrupt conclusion feels like an abandonment. At least it's short."

William Bibbiani of TheWrap said, "So lacking in substance and purpose that after a while you can't even hear the dialogue over the incessant sound of Aristotle's ghost punching himself." Kevin Maher gave the film zero out of five in The Times, called it "the end of cinema", and said it "provoked periods of actual physical discomfort. I had to stab myself repeatedly in the hand with a pen to distract from the howling distress." Alissa Wilkinson of The New York Times stated "There's a flat empty nothingness to The Super Mario Galaxy Movie, even more than its flat empty predecessor," and complained that it had an overstuffed narrative which left little room to get emotionally invested. However, Wilkinson still offered mild praise for the animators' visual world-building. Bilge Ebiri of Vulture also gave an unfavorable review, writing that "Like being asphyxiated in a ball pit filled with candy, the experience of watching The Super Mario Galaxy Movie is at once kaleidoscopic and nerve-wracking," writing it had strained chaos and corporate flatness, but found the hand-animated, anime-styled introduction of Glen Powell's Star Fox to be a highlight.

Peter Bradshaw of The Guardian gave The Super Mario Galaxy Movie one out of five, calling it a "bland screensaver of a movie that's actually worse than AI" and "an inert and uninteresting follow-up". Owen Gleiberman of Variety, who praised the previous film, called it a "frenetic and disappointing sequel", while also stating: "[It] almost seems like these talented artists have been body-snatched." Clint Worthington of RogerEbert.com gave it one and a half out of four, writing: "This is not a movie to be scrutinised, but to allow beleaguered elder millennial dads to sit their tots down for a precious two hours (if you count the trailers) and get some much-needed rest." Wilson Chapman of IndieWire gave The Super Mario Galaxy Movie a grade of C−, saying that while the video game "is filled with moments of euphoric joy", the film "registers as flat, imagination packed into the most cleanly corporate and focus-group approved form possible." In Screen International, Tim Grierson wrote that it had "strained humor and cluttered action sequences ... too often this Illumination production mistakes visual and narrative busyness for genuine excitement." Clarisse Loughrey of The Independent gave the film two out of five, calling it "a joke-free sequel that doubles down on its own blandness." Andrzej Lukowski of Time Out gave it three out of five, saying it was "not deep, but [is] made with love and it hits the spot." Gene Park of The Washington Post gave it a mixed review writing, "The modernity of Chris Pratt prattling as Mario and the rest of the cast firing off frenetic fast-paced gags and snark is still exhausting and comes off flat," criticizing the fast pacing for stifling the game's iconic orchestral music while still admiring the film's physical comedy and its visuals.

In a review from IGN, Clint Gage wrote "The Super Mario Galaxy Movie is a dazzling, reference-stuffed sequel whose wall-to-wall Easter eggs, epic action set pieces, and affectionate design work keep fans grinning even as the crowded plot and lack of a single emotional throughline prevent it from reaching the heights of its predecessor." Lindsey Bahr of the Associated Press said "The joy of video games like Super Mario Galaxy is simple and pure: The viewer is transported to a colorful fantasy where space isn't scary—it's inviting, shimmering, and full of wonder," appreciating the animation and themes of family dynamics while finding the film's embedded merchandise placement and Easter eggs to be a distracting symptom of late-stage capitalism. According to Frank Scheck of The Hollywood Reporter, "Relentlessly fast-paced and filled with hyperkinetic visuals, the sequel hits the sweet spot in terms of what its target audience wants," praising the vocal performances and animation while noting that adult non-aficionados might find little of interest beyond its surface-level charms.

Soren Andersen of The Seattle Times gave the film a favorable review writing, "Every square inch of the screen, from top to bottom, corner to corner, is packed with images derived from the game... watching it is akin to being inside the 2007 Super Mario Galaxy game itself," praising the grander sci-fi scope and the emotionally recognizable themes of family ties while noting that a deep knowledge of the franchise is essential for full appreciation. Joseph A. Wulfsohn of Fox News gave it a highly positive review writing, "While it doesn't reinvent the wheel, The Super Mario Galaxy Movie is a joy for both kids and their nostalgic parents," declaring that it exceeds its predecessor while praising the "dazzling, vibrant animation", Brian Tyler's "robust" musical score, and Jack Black's comedic vocal performance.

Rosalina's limited role in the film was criticized by fans and critics alike, especially in contrast to Fox McCloud's role. Writing for Gizmodo, James Whitbrook notes that Rosalina lacked a major character arc, writing that "[Brie] Larson barely even gets more than a handful of lines that aren’t Rosalina grunting as she struggles against captivity." Chrishaun Baker of Inverse noted that her new role as Peach's older sister "doesn’t have enough to do in the movie to make the reveal as emotionally memorable as the game's storybook tale," in which Rosalina is stated to have had parents and a brother but is otherwise of no relation to Peach. Mercedes Rose, who voiced Rosalina in Super Mario Galaxy, praised Brie Larson's performance while also noting that she should have gotten more screentime.

=== Accolades ===
Award	Date of ceremony	Category	Recipient(s)	Result	Ref.
Golden Trailer Awards	May 28, 2026	Best Animation/Family TV Spot	The Super Mario Galaxy Movie, Go, Universal Pictures, Buddha Jones	Nominated	
Nickelodeon Kids' Choice Awards	November 14, 2026	Favorite Animated Movie	The Super Mario Galaxy Movie	Nominated	
Nickelodeon Kids' Choice Awards	November 14, 2026	Favorite Female Animated Voice from a Movie	Anya Taylor-Joy	Nominated	
Nickelodeon Kids' Choice Awards	November 14, 2026	Favorite Female Animated Voice from a Movie	Brie Larson	Nominated	
Nickelodeon Kids' Choice Awards	November 14, 2026	Favorite Male Animated Voice from a Movie	Chris Pratt	Nominated	
Nickelodeon Kids' Choice Awards	November 14, 2026	Favorite Male Animated Voice from a Movie	Jack Black	Nominated	
Nickelodeon Kids' Choice Awards	November 14, 2026	Favorite Villain	Jack Black	Nominated	
Hollywood Music in Media Awards	November 18, 2026	Best Original Score in an Animated Film	Brian Tyler	Nominated	
The Game Awards	December 10, 2026	Best Adaptation	The Super Mario Galaxy Movie	Pending	

== Future ==
Nintendo and Universal filed copyright information for an "Untitled Donkey Kong Project" in May 2025. In March 2026, Jack Black joked about performing a singing duet with Donald Glover in a third Mario film "in 2029". The same month, when ScreenRant interviewed the cast, Charlie Day expressed interest in reprising his role in a film based on Luigi's Mansion. Keegan-Michael Key and Anya Taylor-Joy further joked "Everybody loves a Jumpscare... especially three-year-olds".

In April 2026, following the release of The Super Mario Galaxy Movie, Miyamoto implied that there were no plans for a crossover film based on the Super Smash Bros. video game series, "I'll say that unlike something like Super Smash Bros., I don't think you'll have a situation [where] all Nintendo characters would be joining." That same month, an "untitled Illumination/Nintendo event film", rumored to be the aforementioned Donkey Kong-centric spin-off, was given a release date of April 12, 2028.

== See also ==
- List of films based on video games
- List of films featuring dinosaurs
