= List of animated television series of 2026 =

This is a list of animated television series that aired in 2026.

Title	Seasons	Episodes	Country	Year	Original channel	Technique
Adam Loves Adventure	1	20	Ireland	2026–present	RTÉ KIDSjr	Flash
Adventure Time: Side Quests	2	40	United States	2026–present	Hulu; Disney+	Flash; Traditional
Alley Cats	1	6	United Kingdom	2026–present	Netflix	Flash
Among Us	1	10	United States	2026	Paramount+	Traditional
Avatar: Seven Havens	1	13	United States	2026–present	Paramount+	Traditional
Baby Lemmings	1	78	France	2026–present	France 4	CGI
Bass X Machina	1	6	United States	2026–present	Netflix	Flash
Breaking Bear	1	8	United States; Canada	2026–present	Tubi	Flash
Butterfly Academy	1	26	Canada	2026	CBC Kids	CGI
Cartoon Cartoons	1	18	United States	2026	YouTube	Various
Circo Gómez	1	10	Mexico	2026	Vix	Flash
Color Crew: First Numbers		10	United States	2026–present	BabyFirst	Flash
Los Colorado	1	10	Mexico	2026–present	Cartoon Network	Flash
Cow Squad			United States	2026–present	YouTube	Flash
Dang!	1	8	United States	2026–present	Netflix	Traditional
The Doomies	1	22	France; United States	2026–present	Disney+	Traditional
Doozie's Doghouse	1	7	United States	2026–present	Netflix	CGI/Live-action
The Doug Out!			United Kingdom	2026	YouTube	CGI
Dragon Striker	1	11	United States; France	2026–present	Disney XD; Disney Channel/Disney+ (worldwide)	Traditional
Duck and Frog	1	25	United Kingdom	2026	CBBC	Flash
Fairy Express	1	52	Israel	2026	Nick Jr.	CGI
Finally, A Show About Men!			Australia	2026	YouTube	Flash
Flower & Flour	TBA	TBA	Australia; Canada	2026	TVOKids	CGI
Gameoverse	1	1	Australia	2026–present	YouTube	Traditional
Garfield			United States	2026–present	Paramount+	Flash
Goat Girl	1	26	Canada; United Kingdom	2026–present	Cartoon Network	Flash
Golden Axe	1	10	United States	2026–present	Paramount+	Traditional
The Grumpy Onion			Ireland	2026–present	RTÉ KIDSjr	Flash
Happy House	1	26	Australia	2026	ABC Kids	Flash
HexVets and Magic Pets	1	20	United States	2026	Paramount+	CGI/Traditional
Hey A.J.!	1	25	United States	2026–present	Disney Jr.	Flash
Kevin	1	8	United States	2026	Amazon Prime Video	Flash
Kisah Bawah Tanah	1	26	Malaysia	2026–present	Astro Prima	Flash
Legasi Kuasa	TBA	TBA	Malaysia	2026	TV Okey	Traditional
Living the Dream	1	8	United Kingdom; Ireland	2026	Netflix	Flash
Louca	1	26	France	2026	TF1	CGI
MaeBee	1	52	United Kingdom	2026–present	CBeebies	Flash
Magicampers	1	22	United States	2026–present	Disney Jr.	CGI
The Marsupilamis	1	52	French; Belgium	2026–present	Nickelodeon	CGI
Mating Season	1	10	United States	2026–present	Netflix	Traditional
Migali	1	52	France	2026	TF1	Flash
Millie Magnificent	1	52	Canada	2026–present	Treehouse TV	CGI
Montclair & the Mechanical Mysteries			France	2026	TV5Monde	CGI
O Mundo [Sem Filtro] de Any Malu	TBA	10	Brazil	2026	Cartoon Network; HBO Max	Toon Boom Harmony
My Two Cents	1	8	Italy	2026	Netflix	Flash
New Keluarga Somat	1	26	Indonesia	2026–present	Mentari TV	CGI
Pablo: Next Level	1	40	United Kingdom; Ireland	2026–present	CBBC	Flash
Phoebe & Jay	1	16	United States; Canada	2026–present	PBS Kids	Flash
Pif & Hercule Go Green	1	26	France	2026–present	Canal+ Kids	CGI
Planetronika	TBA	1	Philippines	2026–present	YouTube	Traditional
President Curtis	2	10	United States	2026–present	Adult Swim	Flash
Rabbit Academy	1	52	Germany	2026	KiKa	Flash
Rafi the Wishing Wizard	1	52	United Kingdom	2026–present	CBeebies; BBC iPlayer	Flash
Regular Show: The Lost Tapes	1	38	United States	2026–present	Cartoon Network	Traditional
Sofia the First: Royal Magic	1	13	United States	2026–present	Disney Jr.	CGI
Star Wars: Maul – Shadow Lord	2	10	United States	2026–present	Disney+	CGI
Stranger Things: Tales from '85	2	18	United States	2026–present	Netflix	CGI
Strip Law	1	10	United States	2026	Netflix	Flash
Submarine Jim	1	52	France	2026–present	Toggo (Germany); CBBC (United Kingdom)	Flash
Super Why's Comic Book Adventures	1	20	United States	2026–present	PBS Kids	Flash
Tales From Outer Suburbia	1	10	Australia	2026	ABC iview	CGI
Ted: The Animated Series	TBA	TBA	United States	2026	Peacock	Traditional
Terror Man	1	8	South Korea	2026	TVING	Traditional
Tiny Head	TBA	TBA	France	2026	TV5 Monde	Flash
Tomb Raider King	1	5	South Korea	2026	Aniplus	Traditional
Tralala	1	52	Canada	2026–present	CBC Kids	Flash
Unicorn Academy: Secrets Revealed	2	14	United States	2026–present	Netflix	CGI
Witch Detectives	1	26	France	2026–present	TF1; Super RTL	CGI
Zog	1	52	United Kingdom	2026–present	CBeebies	CGI

== See also ==
- 2026 in animation
- 2026 in anime
- List of animated feature films of 2026
