= Sardar Sarvai Papanna (film) =

- సర్దార్ సర్వాయి పాపన్న (Telugu)
- Directed by: Venkatesh Goud Lingampalli
- Written by: Venkatesh Goud Lingampalli
- Screenplay by: Venkatesh Goud Lingampalli
- Produced by: Venkatesh Goud Lingampalli
- Starring: Sardar Sarvai Papanna; Aliya Begum; Nanchari; Madhavi Latha; Sarvamma; Dharmanna
- Cinematography: Suresh Malla; Mirzapuri Simon; Pravallika Raj Lakkam; G. V. Harikishore
- Edited by: Chiranjeevi Karrolla; Praveen Ragi; Satish Peteti
- Music by: Raj Kiran; Raghu Charukeshi
- Production company: VG Movie Makers
- Distributed by: VG Movie Makers
- Release date: 21 August 2026 (India)
- Running time: 145 minutes
- Country: India
- Language: Telugu
- Budget: ₹3.6 crore

Sardar Sarvai Papanna – The Rebel King of Deccan is a 2026 Indian Telugu-language historical animated feature film directed and produced by Venkatesh Goud Lingampalli under the banner of VG Movie Makers. Based on the life of 17th-century bandit chieftain Sarvayi Papadu, the film depicts his armed resistance against local feudal oppression and Mughal expansion in the Deccan region. Noted as an early feature-length Indian production developed using AI-assisted animation and generative computer graphics, the film was theatrically released on 21 August 2026.

== Plot ==
During the late 17th century in the Deccan region, Sarvai Papanna observes systemic oppression, heavy taxation, and feudal exploitation under Mughal administration. Following the death of his father Dharmanna, Papanna is motivated by his mother Sarvamma to initiate armed resistance against local administrative oppression.

Papanna organizes agrarian communities and fighters across diverse social backgrounds into an armed rebellion. Rather than relying solely on guerrilla warfare, he establishes fortified strongholds at Sarvaipeta, Tatikonda, and Shahpur.

The regional instability following the decline of the Golconda Sultanate and the execution of ministers Akkanna and Madanna creates a power vacuum across Telangana. Papanna expands his administrative campaigns around Warangal and Bhongir. As his influence grows, opposing forces align against him. Imperial commanders Yusuf Khan and Rustam Dilawar Khan coordinate with local rival Venkat Rao to besiege Shahpur Fort. Militarily outnumbered and facing internal betrayal, Papanna is eventually captured, though his resistance endures as a regional historical legacy.

== Cast ==
- Sardar Sarvai Papanna
- Aliya Begum
- Nanchari
- Madhavi Latha
- Dharmanna
- Sarvamma
- Aurangzeb Alamgir
- Abul Hasan Qutb Shah
- Rustam Dilawar Khan
- Qasim Khan
- Yusuf Khan
- Venkat Rao

== Production ==
The film was conceived as an animated historical biography exploring the socio-political movements of the late 17th century in Telangana. Venkatesh Goud Lingampalli handled the story, screenplay, direction, and production under the VG Movie Makers banner. Editing was handled by Chiranjeevi Karrolla, Praveen Ragi, and Satish Peteti.

Visual development, background design, character styling, and battle environments were generated using AI-assisted animation pipelines and computer-generated imagery (CGI), supervised by Suresh Malla and Saganix Studio in association with Luminoid Studio.

== Music ==
The original soundtrack and score were composed by Raj Kiran and Raghu Charukeshi, with lyrics written by Venkatesh Goud Lingampalli.

No.	Title	Singer(s)	Length
1.	"Amba Jai Jai Jai Jagadamba"		
2.	"Jagajjanani Akhilanda Koti Maisamma"		
3.	"Amma Bhuthalli"		
4.	"Sarasara Sena Kadile"		
5.	"Parihasamaduthoo Marimari Choosthadu"		
6.	"Jagajjanani Yellamma Song"		

== Release and reception ==
The film received a 'UA 13+' certificate from the Hyderabad regional office of the Central Board of Film Certification (CBFC) on 3 August 2026 (Certificate No: DIL/6/57/2026-HYD), with an official runtime of 145 minutes and 54 seconds. It had its theatrical release across Telangana and Andhra Pradesh on 21 August 2026.

Reviewing the film for Namasthe Telangana, critics praised the film as a tribute to regional history, commending its depiction of the Bahujan warrior's struggle for self-governance and the integration of folklore with modern animation. V6 Velugu commended the project's technical initiative in portraying Telangana's historical legacy through new-age visual technology. Media outlets including News18 Telugu and Times Now highlighted the film's utilization of generative AI tools in regional Telugu cinema and its portrayal of 17th-century warfare.

Upon its release, the film garnered positive word of mouth from audiences.
