= Ihn =

Ihn may refer to:

- Ihn (Wallerfangen), a village in Saarland, Germany
- Ihn Yo-han (born John Alderman Linton, 1959), American and South Korean physician and politician

== See also ==
- IHN (disambiguation)
