= The Shrew of Destiny =

Polish comic book

- Author: Tomasz Samojlik
- Original title: Ryjówka przeznaczenia
- Illustrator: Tomasz Samojlik
- Language: Polish (original)
- Genre: Comedy; Fantasy; Science
- Publisher: Kultura Gniewu
- Publication date: 2014
- Publication place: Poland (origin)

The Shrew of Destiny (Polish: Ryjówka przeznaczenia) is a Polish graphic novel that tells the story of Dobrzyk the shrew who along with his animal friends from the Białowieża Forest set out to stop an unfriendly human whose environmental unawareness may end up destroying the forest. It was written and illustrated by Tomasz Samojlik... It is the first book in the Shrew Saga (Polish: Saga o Ryjówce) series about the adventures of animals from the Białowieża Forest, Poland. The book was published in the year 2014 by Kultura Gniewu and is one of his most famous comics. There are, as of 2021, three sequels to the book. It is a book from the fantasy genre that mostly keeps in line with natural facts about its setting and characters.

== Characters ==
=== Main characters ===
- Dobrzyk (Eurasian pygmy shrew, Latin Sorex minutus, Polish ryjówka malutka)

The main character. He is a clumsy pygmy shrew who gets beaten or begged into surrender by the insects that are a shrew's prey. Due to this, he relies on support from Śmiłka for his food.

As a pygmy shrew, he is among the smallest shrews. He also has a crown-shaped marking that suggests that he is The Shrew of Destiny.

- Śmiłka (common shrew, Latin Sorex araneus, Polish ryjówka aksamitna)

Dobrzyk's good friend who provides him with food.

- Labhallan (Eurasian water shrew, Latin Neomys fodiens, Polish rzęsorek rzeczek)

A water shrew with a paralyzing bite. He is a self-proclaimed “Bloody warrior and a ladies’ man”.

He lives near the river and is unaware that it has been poisoned by the human until Dobrzyk points out that all the fish are dead, probably from being poisoned, thus saving Labhallan's life.

- Korina (bicolored, white-toothed shrew, Latin Crocidura leucodon, Polish zębiełek białawy)

The princess of the white-toothed shrews.

- Kosmacz (European hedgehog. Latin Erinaceus europaeus, Polish jeż europejski)

A hedgehog who guards a path between two trees, and lets travelers through if they either pay a fee of ten earthworms or defeat him in a duel, though he claims that he is undefeatable. His weakness is a severe case of arachnophobia, or fear of spiders, that Dobrzyk exploits to gain passage.

- Fiodor (European pond turtle, Latin Emys orbicularis, Polish żółw błotny)

A wise old turtle who is the sage of Shrews’ Valley. He sleeps most of the time, however. As a turtle, he is very long-lived, possibly over one hundred years old.

- Sorek (common shrew, Latin Sorex araneus, Polish ryjówka aksamitna)

Another common shrew, he runs the school in Shrews’ Valley. He uses a walking stick made of a pine needle due to being elderly. He is also Fiodor's friend.

- ? (American mink, Latin Neogale vison, Polish wizon amerykański, norka amerykańska)

An unnamed mink who attempts to kill Dobrzyk. The second book reveals him to be a spy to the Mink Emperor.

=== Supporting characters ===
- Taka and Tuka (common toads, Latin bufo bufo, Polish ropucha szara)

Two female toads, extremely toxic back, who lead the shrews to the nail in the tree. They tell the legend of the forest guardian.

- Mr. and Mrs. Raven (common ravens, Latin corvus corax, Polish kruk zwyczajny)

Two friendly ravens, look on from trees, commenting everything and arguing

- The Black Enemy (human, Latin homo sapiens, Polish człowiek)

Takes trash into the forest polluting it.

- Rare Spider (funnel-web spider, Latin Agelena labyrinthica, Polish lejkowiec labiryntowy)

A spider who helps Dobrzyk beat Kosmacz.

- Himisław (forest dormouse, Latin Dryomys nitedula, Polish koszatka leśna)

Meets Dobrzyk on a tree.

- Bats (brown long-eared bat, Latin plecotus auratus, Polish gacek brunatny)

Live in a tree hollow and use echolocation. They give Dobrzyk an airlift.

- Badger (European badger, Latin meles meles, Polish borsuk europejski)

Lives in a burrow, lets the shrews through as a reward for answering his riddle.

- Rhinoceros beetle (European rhinoceros beetle, Latin oryctes nasicornis, Polish rohatyniec nosorożec)

Helps get the nail out of the tree stump.

- Stefan and unnamed friend (unknown shrew species)

Two shrew soldiers who patrol the borders.

- Barbarian Slug (tree slug, Latin lehmannia marginate, Polish pomrów)

A slug who threatens to kill the shrews but ends up getting eaten himself.

- Owl (tawny owl, Latin strix aluco, Polish puszczyk zwyczajny)

An owl who captures Dobrzyk after the shrews exit the badger burrow.

- Forest ranger (human, Latin homo sapiens, Polish człowiek)

Has to remind the polluter about the importance of recycling.

- The Black Enemy’s wife (human, Latin homo sapiens, Polish człowiek)

She gives her husband the ideas for polluting the forest.

== Setting ==
The story is set in a fictional area deep in the Białowieża Forest that is called The Shrew's Valley. The valley is inhabited by several shrew species, who live in a medieval society and believe in prophecies. The surrounding forest has some notable landmarks, such as the Owl Meadow, badger burrow, Kosmacz the Hedgehog's Gate and the river. A map poster stylized as a leaf, is included in It the third book of the series. The forest is also a UNESCO Biosphere Reserve and a World Heritage Site and is located between Poland and Belarus.

== Lore ==
=== The Black Enemy Prophecy ===
It is explained by Fiodor the Turtle to the shrews in the Shrews’ Valley School scene at the beginning of the story. Once, the Black Enemy came to the forest, and left not a tree standing. The prophecy says that he will return, and when he does, the Shrew of Destiny will appear to fight him.

=== The Legend of the Forest Guardian ===
A story told by Taka and Tuka, the toad witches, explaining the nail in the stump to the shrews after the first polluted area scene in the middle of the story. Long ago the forest guardian got a nail in his foot, but was saved by a small shrew. The guardian then put the nail in a tree stump.

== Plot ==
=== Main story ===
The story begins with Dobrzyk fighting a spider in the forest. Eventually, Dobrzyk overcomes the spider, who begs for mercy and says that it is an endangered species. Dobrzyk leaves the spider be and continues the hunt, finding a large cuckoo egg, however, he is begged by some smaller birds into not eating the egg. He returns to Shrews’ Valley, unaware that he is being followed by a mink, and meets Śmiłka, who points out that he did not catch anything, as usual, and shares a snack, an earthworm, with him. She calls him out on being a softy, but he denies that. He pulls up his shirt to show that there is not a gram of fat on him, also revealing a strange, crown-shaped marking. Unknown to the shrews, the marking is seen by the mink. Meanwhile, the shrews retreat to their burrows. The mink walks away, monologuing about how he will dispose of the shrew with the “king's mark” and that then, minks can take over. Then, the scene cuts to Korina stuck in a plastic bottle, calling for help. The call is heard by two shrew guards on duty some distance away, but they dismiss it. Suddenly, they encounter a bottle cap, and then, a cloaked shadow covers the ground. Meanwhile, the scene cuts to Dobrzyk sleeping in his burrow when he is woken by Korina, who is trying to tell him something. Dobrzyk is confused by this and wakes up before he can learn anything.

Dobrzyk is woken by Śmiłka, and they head to the local school for their final exams. Along the way, they encounter the birds from earlier, who are having trouble with the cuckoo chick, that has since hatched. Dobrzyk confronts the cuckoo chick and advises it to go live with larger birds, like a local crow couple, who can provide it with more food. The chick takes off, and Dobrzyk and Śmiłka arrive at the school, that is, a clearing under a tree. They meet Sorek, the only teacher at the school, who quizzes them on shrew-appropriate behavior. During the test, the guards from earlier barge into the school, saying that they saw a “Black Enemy”. Everyone except Dobrzyk knows what is happening and Sorek wakes up his friend Fiodor, the ancient turtle, and asks him for help. Dobrzyk suddenly remembers the evil's name, calling it a “hume” (a warped version of the word “human”, in the Polish version “ludź” as in “ludzie”, humans). Fiodor then recounts the prophecy about the Black Enemy and the Shrew of Destiny, that the Black Enemy will destroy the forest. However, there is also a positive part of the story. When the Enemy comes, a shrew of destiny will appear to battle them. Dobrzyk, hungry and bored, chases a butterfly to the riverbank, however, the butterfly slaps him with its wings, and he gives up the chase. He then notices an upturned fish and decides it will do fine too. However, he is then attacked by a water shrew, who intends to steal the fish. Then, Dobrzyk notices that all the fish in the river are upturned. Concluding that the river is poisoned, Dobrzyk stops the water shrew from eating the fish. The water shrew apologizes and introduces himself as Labhallan, a “Bloody warrior and ladies’ man” before he suddenly escapes into the nearby grass.

Śmiłka approaches the riverbank, and Dobrzyk tells her about the water shrew. She then notices what happened to the river. They return to the school and inform Sorek and Fiodor of the problem. Fiodor closes his eyes, thinking how to recognize the Shrew of Destiny, not knowing that a grasshopper has landed on his head. Dobrzyk follows the insect up to Fiodor's head, and it escapes. Dobrzyk loses his balance, and tips onto the turtle's face just as Fiodor opens his eyes, and the turtle recognizes Dobrzyk as the Shrew of Destiny. Everyone is surprised by this, and Dobrzyk faints. Again, he encounters Korina in his dream, this time in the bottle where she is trapped. She tells him to find and free her, and that she is where the Black Enemy is. Dobrzyk wakes up, and Fiodor gives him some tips for the quest. Sorek tells the guards to take Dobrzyk to where they saw the enemy. Dobrzyk and the guards reach a polluted area where the Black Enemy is. Suddenly, the Enemy appears, revealed to be a local man who has been throwing his trash into the forest. Dobrzyk escapes from the human down a hole and finds himself in Korina's bottle prison. Upon meeting her, Dobrzyk is fully convinced that she is real, and he attempts to bite through the bottle. When that fails, he resorts to calling for help. Śmiłka then appears and rescues them. After an introduction, they learn that the guardian of the forest is the only one who can stop the human and that they need the nail in the tree stump. They acquire it, and rainfall starts. During a crossing of a slippery tree trunk over a river, Dobrzyk falls into the water and is saved by Labhallan. Labhallan tells the group that he met the guardian of the forest once, and he will take them to where that happened.

The rain stops, and they continue the march before they come to a path between two trees guarded by Kosmacz, the hedgehog. Kosmacz challenges Dobrzyk to a duel, and if the shrew could win, the group would get free passage. The battle begins, but the Endangered Spider from before jumps on him. Dobrzyk tells the hedgehog, who is afraid of spiders, to lie down so that he can get the spider off. Since the criteria for victory was to get the opponent to the ground, The group gains passage. Kosmacz decides to join the group after realizing that he is not unbeatable. They come upon the Owl Meadow, where owls grab unsuspecting prey. They choose to avoid it using a Badger burrow. They find their way using echolocation but are blocked from exiting by a badger. Dobrzyk manages to answer the badger's riddle, and they are let through. Dobrzyk is then captured by an owl but manages to escape its grip by shrinking himself. In his absence, Sorek joins the group, having followed them. Dobrzyk falls into a hole in a tree, that is filled with bats, and hitches a ride on one of them. However, the Bat drops him. Unconscious, he encounters Śmiłka in the dream. Upon awakening, Śmiłka and the rest of the group encounter the mink. Kosmacz holds the mink off while the rest of the group can escape. Dobrzyk then appears, and the mink attacks him but is suddenly scared off by the guardian of the forest, a European bison. Dobrzyk climbs the bison with the nail from the tree stump and asks him for help. The bison refuses and throws Dobrzyk off, but he is caught by the small bird and lowered safely to the ground.

Without the bison's help, the group goes off to fight a desperate final battle against the human, and Dobrzyk leaves the nail in the ground. Korina reveals that she also has a king's mark, and that the mink had been sent to destroy all of the royalty in Shrews’ Valley. The group reenters the polluted area, where the human is bringing new trash. He notices the group, and the battle begins. The Human prepares to stomp the group when he is stopped by the European bison, who forces him to pick up the trash.

In the end, Kosmacz leaves to find another path between trees, Korina and Labhallan leave on a honeymoon, and Dobrzyk becomes the king of the shrews. However, the mink is still plotting to establish Shrews’ Valley as mink territory.

=== Epilogue 1 (“Romantic Ending”) ===
Dobrzyk is fighting a caterpillar and loses to it. Śmiłka then gives him another insect and says that he can always count on her.

=== Epilogue 2 (Thriller ending) ===
The human's wife points out to him that he has brought all the trash back. Then, a forest ranger comes to visit them and informs them about recycling and trash cans.

=== Bonus Story (Sorek and Fiodor: Explorers of the Forest’s Darkest and Lightest Secrets) ===
Sorek and Fiodor are searching for the Sleeping Doormouse to wake her up. They find the stump where she is sleeping, only to be scared off by slugs.

=== Bonus Shrew Movie Posters ===
A collection of shrew themed movie posters humorously referencing classic movies: “Shrew Saga Episode I” (Star Wars Episode I), “The Planet of Minks” (The Planet of Apes), “Dancing with the Shrews” (Dancing With the Wolves), “Raiders of the Lost Dormouse” (Raiders of the Lost Ark), “To Kill a Beetle” (To Kill a Mockingbird), “The Silence of The Shrews” (The Silence of The Lambs), “Shrew Park” (Jurassic Park), “The Game of Tails” (The Game of Thrones).

== Reception ==
“The Shrew of Destiny” received generally favorable reviews and was read by a wide audience, reviewers praising it for its educational quality, getting it into the “science comics” category, and a message of saving the environment, earning it the title of “eco-comic”. The book was praised for its style, warm colors, and soft, serene lines (typical of the author) with “cartoony” characters, the good aesthetic regardless of computerized creation, and the paper quality. The use of a large panel that takes up a whole page to emphasize a dramatic situation by the author was applauded. It was also acknowledged positively that in children's book fashion, the characters are likable, and readers often wish them well.

It is difficult to place the book in a strict age category, due to it originally being made for kids but finding itself read by teens and adults, who noticed the many references to pop-culture and science fiction/fantasy classics such as “The Lord of The Rings”, “Star Wars”, “Monty Python and the Holy Grail”, with a style similar to “Thorgal”, “Usagi Yojimbo”, “Bone” and Tadeusz Baranowski’s comics. These references, wordplay, and situation jokes make a second layer of the book, which is more understandable and more appealing to adults, not children.

It was also criticized for overly anthropomorphizing the animal characters to the point of unnaturalizing them and showing the “bad guy” as an uneducated villager who disrespects nature even though they tend to pollute less than city-dwellers. To balance the fantasy and educational qualities the book contains a segment at the end explaining the facts about its characters’ various species that adds to the overall educational value.

== Awards ==
It was nominated comic book of the year by Dybuk and, in 2012, won its author Tomasz Samojlik the Polish Comic Book Society Award. A sequel, “The Shrews’ Winter”, received an award in a plebiscite of the reader blog awarding youth literature “Lokomotywa".

== Impact ==
In 2013, when “The Shrew of Destiny” was first published, Polish comics were dying out, and the book served to partially revive the genre for kids. It was the base of many of its author's drawing workshops with kids. It later received a second edition containing a bonus story.

== Adaptations ==
- Radio theater: A word-by-word conversion of The Shrew of Destiny into a radio transmission by the studio Sound Tropez. Featuring Marcin Hycnar as Dobrzyk and Julia Kamińska as Śmiłka
- Movie: An upcoming animated adaptation of The Shrew of Destiny, created by the animation studio EGoFILM. Samojlik himself did not draw the animation, however, he, along with Maciej Kur, are working on the script. As of 2021, the movie is in the production stage, a trailer has already been released in both Polish and English

== Other books in the series ==
- Norka zagłаdy (“The Mink of Extinction”), 2015

The book tells the later adventures of the shrews, this time threatened by minks which are an invasive species, and those often cause the extinction of local species due to having little to no natural threats.

- Powrót rzęsorka (“The Return of Cilia”), 2015

The book is about the shrews and a Eurasian water shrew (A.K.A. a Cilia), a creature related to the shrew, only it has venomous teeth and swims well, escaping from a massive forest fire.

- Zguba zębiełków (“The Shrews’ Winter”), 2018

A comic about the shrews’ struggle to survive the winter.

- Opowieść z Doliny Ryjówek (“A Story from Shrews’ Valley”), 2021

A free, short prequel about Dobrzyk and the mysterious disappearance of the Rain-Boot temple.
