= Copán La Leyenda =

- Theatrical release poster
- Directed by: Ricardo Morales
- Produced by: Level 7 Studios
- Release date: May 7, 2026 (Metrocinemas)
- Running time: 74 minutes
- Country: Honduras
- Language: Spanish

Copán La Leyenda (English: Copán The Legend) is a 2026 Honduran AI-generated animated film directed by Ricardo Morales and produced by Level 7 Studios. The film was promoted by the Honduran Institute of Tourism (IHN) and Banco Atlántida, one of the largest banks in the Central American country, with the aim of promoting Mayan archaeological sites located in the Copán Department. It premiered on May 7, 2026, in Honduran theaters and it was heavily panned by the critics and audience.

== Synopsis ==
The film follows the adventures of disgraced archaeologist Roberto Agurcia and his grandson Gabo, a high school student, as they explore various ancient ruins in Honduras and attempt to create a portal to Xibalba, the underworld present in Mayan mythology.

== Development ==
The film's director, Ricardo Morales, told the Honduran newspaper El Libertador that the idea for the film came to him after a visit to the Copán Ruins when he was 7 years old. According to Televisión Nacional de Honduras (TNH), the Honduran government's state-run media outlet, the film took about 15 years to develop with the aim of promoting tourism in the country and was supported by Andrés Ehrler, head of the Honduran Ministry of Tourism.The film received support from the oldest school in Tegucigalpa, Elvel School, the Banco Atlántida Museum, and the Bancatlan Cultural Fund Foundation as part of their efforts to promote the country's cultural heritage.

Following the film’s premiere, director Ricardo Morales spoke in detail to the newspaper La Prensa about the film’s negative reception and the production process. He clarified that the 15 years mentioned in press releases were dedicated to the creative process, and that about 10 of those were originally devoted to creating 3D environments and characters using traditional methods.

Morales clarified that the original film was going to be a traditional 3D animated movie, but due to production costs and budget cuts, the process had to be put on hold. With the advent of AI-powered video creation tools, the decision was made to use these tools to largely finish what was needed to complete the film. Morales also made it clear that he is open to the idea of creating sequels or other films using AI, citing examples of productions that use it in China and Japan.

== Release ==
The film was initially distributed by Metrocinemas, a local cinema chain in Honduras, on May 7, 2026. The premiere was attended by the Honduran Minister of Tourism Andrés Ehrler, who also promoted the film on social media.

Reports emerged of children in some schools being forced to watch it.

It was also shown in various audiovisual programs at some public schools with the aim of raising awareness of archaeological ruins and tourist attractions.

== Reception ==
The film drew heavy criticism and sparked debate within artistic and media circles in Latin America following the use of artificial intelligence to replace real artists from local productions.

Danielle Marcillo, Ecuadorian journalist for Diario Expreso, stated that the film had several flaws, such as forced product placement for brands like Banco Atlántida, as well as promotions for the latest car models that had no connection to the film, calling it a “long commercial.” Additionally, the film contained messages alluding to conspiracy theories regarding flat-Earth beliefs, which could set a bad example for students who were required to review the film in their schools. Kenneth Triviño, an entertainment reporter for Ecuavisa, explained that the film could mark the beginning of a new era for the Latin American animation industry, in which the widespread use of artificial intelligence could jeopardize artists’ job security and encourage the theft of intellectual property in order to cut production costs.

The movie has been heavily criticized all over social media, and in response to it Level 7 Studios has silenced lots of users who showed their discomfort with the movie on the studio's social media by blocking and deleting their comments in a desperate attempt to cover the bad reception of their work.

Antonela Rabanal, Peruvian entertainment journalist for Infobae, explained that the film had sparked considerable controversy on social media, noting that it could set a bad precedent for filmmakers and animators in the region. She cited various media outlets dedicated to reviewing animated content in Latin America, such as Cinemafilia, which described the film as "a forced mix, incapable of developing an idea with true ingenuity".

Ivel Hernández Martínez, a Mexican visual effects specialist, commented that the film made extensive use of AI tools to generate both its visuals and sound, resulting in a film that is confusing and incoherent, and that it could set a bad example for young people by including messages that promote conspiracy theories, such as the claim that the moon landing was faked, in addition it divided the Honduran academic community when shown in public schools due to the film’s poor quality and lack of educational value.

Jamie Lang, editor of Cartoon Brew, explained that although the animation market in Honduras is fairly small, many artists and the general audience are more willing to support films that showcase human creativity and artistic intent rather than those that rely on new technologies such as generative AI.

Julieta Chavéz for The Hollywood Reporter en Español, noted that much of the film’s background imagery is unrecognizable, as is the presence of watermarks from Gemini Image Generator in the trailers and promotional materials made the film appear less professional.

Yoel Melián, a cultural journalist for the Spanish newspaper La Razón, concludes, “Copán La Leyenda is not just a bad movie; it is a serious warning about the direction cultural creation is taking,” as part of his review, explaining that films generated entirely with AI and aimed at children can cause problems in brain development, citing several academic studies that explain how exposure at an early age to overly stimulating content can cause attention deficits.
