= 2026 in animation =

2026 in animation is an overview of notable events, including notable awards, list of films released, television show debuts and endings, and notable deaths.

== Events ==
=== January ===
- January 1: Clarabelle Cow, Blondie, Pluto, Flip the Frog, and the first Betty Boop cartoon Dizzy Dishes enter the public domain in the United States.
- January 9: Stan Marsh, Kyle Broflovski, Eric Cartman, Kenny McCormick, & Butters Stotch from South Park were all added as skins to Fortnite, Towelie was also added as a sidekick.
- January 11: Season 3 of Primal premiered on Adult Swim.
- January 15:
  - A third Phineas and Ferb film is announced by Disney Branded Television to be in development.
  - Ice King, Fionna, Cake, & Lemongrab from Adventure Time were all added as skins to Fortnite.
- January 16:
  - The final two episodes of the fifth season of Phineas and Ferb premiere on Disney Channel and Disney XD simultaneously.
  - The Phineas and Ferb spin-off short series titled Agent P, Under C premiered on Disney+, with its first episode uploaded to YouTube.
- January 17: The final ten episodes from the fifth season of Phineas and Ferb were released on Disney+.
- January 22: Shingo Yamashita's Cosmic Princess Kaguya!, produced by Studio Colorido and Studio Chromato, was released on Netflix.
- January 24:
  - Ed from Ed, Edd n Eddy was added as a skin to Fortnite.
  - A crossover series between Cocomelon and Hello Kitty, titled CoComelon Playdates with Sanrio Friends, was released on YouTube.
- January 26: Turner Classic Movies (TCM) announced a six-year contract with Warner Bros. Discovery to air the Looney Tunes and Merrie Melodies shorts starting in February amid ongoing efforts from several companies to acquire the company.
- January 29: The Incredibles is inducted into the National Film Registry.
- January 30:
  - Mordecai & Skips from Regular Show were added as skins to Fortnite, Rigby was also added as a sidekick.
  - Neon's Arco was released.

=== February ===
- February 2:
  - The Looney Tunes and Merrie Melodies shorts began airing on TCM with a marathon of Bugs Bunny cartoons.
  - Season 2 of The Wonderfully Weird World of Gumball premiered internationally on Cartoon Network and HBO Max.
- February 7: The eighth Helluva Boss short, titled "Mission: Big Boss", was released on YouTube.
- February 9: Season 7 of The Creature Cases premiered on Netflix.
- February 10: Amphibia creator Matt Braly announces that Sony Pictures Animation has canceled a planned film that he and Steven Universe creator Rebecca Sugar had been working on together.
- February 13:
  - Sony Pictures Animation's Goat was released.
  - Glitch Productions officially greenlights Knights of Guinevere for a full series.
  - The teaser trailer for the indie animated series, Clara and the Below, created by Amphibia creator Matt Braly, was released on YouTube.
- February 15: The season 37 finale (also promoted as its 800th episode) of The Simpsons premiered on Fox.
- February 16: The second season of RoboGobo premiered on Disney Jr. in the United States.
- February 18:
  - Kim Possible voice actress Christy Carlson Romano announced she had a positive cancer screening result, but not an official diagnosis.
  - Kristen Bell was announced to be voicing Amy Rose in Sonic the Hedgehog 4 to be released in 2027.
- February 19: It was announced that Jeff Bergman and Anna Vocino will be voicing Mr. & Mrs. Potato Head in Toy Story 5, replacing Don Rickles and Estelle Harris.
- February 21: The 53rd Annie Awards were held.
- February 22: American Dad! returns to Fox after airing on TBS for 12 years with the 22nd season.
- February 25: It was announced that Smiling Friends will end after three seasons, according to the creators Michael Cusack and Zack Hadel, which was their decision. It was also announced that the last two episodes will premiere on April 12 on Adult Swim.
- February 27:
  - Season 11 of The Loud House began on Nickelodeon with the premiere of the episode "Living the Dream Boat."
  - Doraemon: New Nobita and the Castle of the Undersea Devil was released in Japanese theaters.
  - The season 19 finale episode of Upin & Ipin premiered on Astro Prima, Astro Ceria, MNCTV, and RCTI, before twentieth season will premiere.

=== March ===
- March 1: Various Cartoon Network, Warner Bros. Animation, and Hanna-Barbera series were added to Tubi.
- March 2: The thirteenth season of Gabby's Dollhouse, titled "Fairylandia", premiered on Netflix.
- March 6:
  - Disney-Pixar's Hoppers was released.
  - Tom Lizard from Hoppers was added as a skin to Fortnite to celebrate the film's release.
  - Pickle Rick and Rick Prime from Rick and Morty were added as skins to Fortnite.
  - Paramount+ greenlights a new Garfield series starring Lamorne Morris as the titular character.
- March 7:
  - Part 2 of the third and final season of Beastars premiered on Netflix.
  - The ninth Helluva Boss short, titled "Mission: Bigfoot", was released on YouTube.
- March 9: It is confirmed that Donald Glover will voice Yoshi in The Super Mario Galaxy Movie.
- March 12:
  - A second Family Guy spin-off centered around Stewie was announced to be premiering next year on Fox and Hulu.
  - Netflix officially greenlit a sequel to KPop Demon Hunters.
  - The twentieth season of Upin & Ipin, premiered on MNCTV and was released on YouTube.
- March 15: 98th Academy Awards:
  - KPop Demon Hunters directed by Maggie Kang and Chris Appelhans wins Best Animated Feature.
  - The Girl Who Cried Pearls directed by Chris Lavis and Maciek Szczerbowski wins Best Animated Short.
  - Ejae, Mark Sonnenblick, 24, Ido, and Teddy Park's Golden from KPop Demon Hunters wins the Academy Award for Best Original Song.
- March 17: The Kickstarter campaign for Amphibia creator Matt Braly's indie animated series Clara and the Below was fully funded within 15 minutes of launching.
- March 18: Season 4 of Invincible premiered on Prime Video.
- March 19: Bugs Bunny was added as a skin to Fortnite.
- March 20: The eighth and penultimate episode of The Amazing Digital Circus, titled "hjsakldfhl", was released on YouTube.
- March 21:
  - Music video for "My Little One", by Siamés, premiered on YouTube.
  - The first half of Season 2 of Iyanu premiered on Cartoon Network, next day on HBO Max.
  - ZAMination, a web animation group that was founded in 2015 by Zachary Preciado, Micah Preciado, and Andy Gill and became popular for its Minecraft and Five Nights at Freddy's animations, released its official channel introduction video, "What is ZAMination?", on YouTube. The video explained their history from dealing with low budgets and forced content farms under Mob Entertainment to becoming an independent animation studio partnering with Glitch Productions to create original animated shows.
- March 26: Lola Bunny & Daffy Duck were added as skins to Fortnite.
- March 28:
  - Hercules, Megara, & Hades, from Disney's Hercules, were all added as skins to Fortnite.
  - ZAMination released the announcement trailer for Calling All Villains, their first original animated series and an SMG4 spin-off featuring Mr. Puzzles, based on a concept by Luke Lerdwichagul (the machinima series' creator who announced its conclusion in October of 2025 and released its final episode in December of the same year). The series will follow Mr. Puzzles and a new cast of characters as they embark on adventures in an unfamiliar world.

=== April ===
- April 1:
  - Season 2 of Dorohedoro premiered on both Netflix and Crunchyroll.
  - Illumination and Nintendo's The Super Mario Galaxy Movie was released.
  - The tenth Helluva Boss short, titled "Mission: It's Chaz Funeral" was released on YouTube.
- April 2:
  - Season 2 of The Bad Guys: The Series premiered on Netflix.
  - Season 4 of Ninjago: Dragons Rising premiered on Netflix.
  - An anime series adaptation of The Ramparts of Ice was released as a Netflix exclusive.
- April 4: Perry the Platypus and Dr. Heinz Doofenshmirtz from Phineas and Ferb were added as skins to Fortnite.
- April 6: The anime series adaptation of Witch Hat Atelier premiered on Crunchyroll and Netflix.
- April 10: CBS Studios executive Alec Botnick is announced to also be the new president of Nickelodeon Animation Studio Inc., the studio will now operate as its own label for CBS Studios.
- April 12:
  - The last two episodes of Smiling Friends premiered on Adult Swim.
  - Universal Basic Guys concluded its second season on Fox with the episode "Crowmaster".
- April 13: The Avatar Aang: The Last Airbender film was leaked online after clips were shown on X, with the leaker said that Nickelodeon "accidentally emailed them the film", leading to a full investigation.
- April 18:
  - A sixteenth season of Cyberchase was released.
  - The Simpsons showrunner Matt Selman has confirmed that the show has officially stopped featuring couch gags in the intro for every episode to be able to focus more on the plot & airtime length of the episodes.
- April 19: Krapopolis concluded its third season on Fox.
- April 20: Kevin premiered on Prime Video.
- April 22: The first trailer for the long-awaited Looney Tunes film Coyote vs. Acme was released on YouTube.
- April 23: Stranger Things: Tales from '85 was released on Netflix.
- April 24:
  - My Brother the Minotaur premiered on Apple TV.
  - The person who leaked the Avatar Aang: The Last Airbender film was found and arrested in Singapore.
  - The 11th Helluva Boss short, titled "Barbie's Bad Day", premiered at this year's LVL UP EXPO convention, and then on YouTube the following day.
- April 25: Hazbin Hotel gets renewed for a fifth and final season.
- April 28: Stranger Things: Tales from '85 gets renewed for a second season, which is slated to premiere later in the year.

=== May ===
- May 1:
  - Skydance Animation's third feature film Swapped was released as a Netflix exclusive.
  - Angel Studios' Animal Farm was released.
- May 8: Lois Griffin, Peggy Hill and Linda Belcher, were added as skins in Fortnite in honor of Mother's Day.
- May 9: The fourth season of Chibiverse premiered on Disney Channel and Disney XD simultaneously.
- May 11: Regular Show: The Lost Tapes premiered on Cartoon Network in all countries simultaneously, and released internationally on HBO Max.
- May 12: Season 2 of Devil May Cry premiered on Netflix.
- May 15: The pilot episode of Glitch Productions' Gameoverse was released on YouTube.
- May 16: An animated Helluva Boss music video centered around Chazwick Thurman, titled "Shark Boy Summer", for which the song was written and sung by Chazwick's voice actor Eric Schwartz, was released on YouTube.
- May 17:
  - Family Guy concluded its 24th season on Fox with the episode "High School History".
  - Bob's Burgers concluded its 16th season on Fox with the episodes "Stuck in the Middle with Hu(go)" and "Smellbound".
  - American Dad! concluded its 22nd season on Fox with the episode "Where the Wild Boars Are".
- May 19:
  - Rick and Morty co-creator & executive producer Dan Harmon announced that a film based on the popular Adult Swim series is currently in early development at Warner Bros., and will be directed by show director Jacob Hair.
  - The Brazilian dub of The Amazing Digital Circus' upcoming final episode was accidentally leaked online ahead of both its theatrical release, and standard release on social media accounts such as X (Twitter) & TikTok.
- May 20: C. H. Greenblatt revealed on his Instagram account that he recently pitched a preschool-oriented reboot of Chowder titled "Chowder: First Course" to Cartoon Network, but they unfortunately had to reject the idea cause they didn't have enough money to produce the show.
- May 22:
  - Mating Season premiered on Netflix.
  - Pac-Man: Snack Breaks premiered on YouTube.
- May 24: The ninth season of Rick and Morty premiered on Adult Swim.
- May 25: Sofia the First: Royal Magic premiered on Disney Jr. and the next day on Disney+.
- May 26: The final Toy Story 5 trailer was released.
- May 27: My Two Cents premiered on Netflix.

=== June ===
- June 3: Season 4 of The Legend of Vox Machina premiered on Prime Video.
- June 4: The Amazing Digital Circus: The Last Act was released in select theaters throughout United States, Europe, Canada, Latin America, Japan, etc. It combines both Episodes 8 and 9 (with the latter episode making its world premiere).
- June 5:
  - SpongeBob SquarePants concluded its sixteenth season on Nickelodeon with the episode "Karen's Klatch".
  - Among Us is released in its entirety on Paramount+.
- June 8: Regular Show: The Lost Tapes was released on HBO Max in the United States.
- June 9:
  - La Chouette Compagnie's Dragon Striker premiered on Disney XD and Disney+ the next day.
  - SpongeBob SquarePants gets renewed for an 18th & 19th season and The Patrick Star Show gets renewed for 6th & 7th season by Nickelodeon.
- June 12:
  - Dragon Striker premiered on Disney Channel.
  - Animated music video of the song "Her" by JVKE, featuring Annika Wells and Kaden Hawke, was released on YouTube.
  - Season 17 of SpongeBob SquarePants began on Nickelodeon with the premiere of the episodes "Kiss of the Nematode/Brainless Brawn".
  - Pomni and Jax from The Amazing Digital Circus were added as skins in Fortnite in honor of the show's finale, Zooble & Bubble were also featured as pickaxes.
- June 13:
  - The 12th Helluva Boss short, titled "Imp Training Video", was released on YouTube.
  - Season 3 of My Adventures with Superman premiered on Adult Swim.
- June 15: Disney Branded Television (Parent company of Disney Television Animation) rebrands itself as "Disney Kids & Family".
- June 16:
  - The first trailer for Shrek 5 was released on YouTube.
  - Various seasons of Beavis and Butt-Head were released on Netflix for the first time.
- June 19:
  - Pixar's Toy Story 5 was released.
  - The ninth & final episode of The Amazing Digital Circus, titled "Remember", was released on YouTube. Episodes 8 and 9 were also released on Netflix.
- June 22:
  - Warner Bros. Pictures Animation announce their following upcoming projects at this year's Annecy film festival:
    - A new film named "Prehistoria", which will be directed by Hazbin Hotel & Helluva Boss creator Vivienne Medrano.
    - A second Powerpuff Girls film that is currently in development.
  - A theatrical Looney Tunes short titled "Daffy Season" was shown at this year's Annecy film festival, it was later released in theaters alongside The Cat in the Hat. This was the first theatrical Looney Tunes/Merrie Melodies short since "Daffy's Rhapsody" in 2012.
- June 24:
  - The following upcoming Cartoon Network Studios projects were announced at this year's Annecy film festival:
    - A new Adventure Time spin-off titled "Bubblegum & Marceline" for HBO Max.
    - A Conan the Barbarian series developed by Genndy Tartakovsky for Amazon Prime Video.
  - Invincible was announced to be renewed for a 6th season by Prime Video at this year's Annecy film festival.
- June 25: Warner Bros. Animation and DC Studios announce their following upcoming project collabs at this year's Annecy film festival:
  - A series adaptation of the comic book series Absolute Batman by Scott Snyder.
  - Their first ever anime series titled "Joker: Laugh Riot", which will be co-produced by Sola Entertainment.
  - A new Krypto series developed by C. H. Greenblatt.
- June 26:
  - The Doomies premiered on Disney+.
  - Cartoon Network and Adult Swim announce their following upcoming projects at this year's Annecy film festival:
    - A five-part docuseries focusing on the history of Cartoon Network in honor of the channel's upcoming 35th anniversary next year.
    - Two new Robot Chicken specials, one featuring various Adult Swim characters (in honor of the block's 25th anniversary this year), and the other featuring various Cartoon Network characters (in honor of the channel's upcoming 35th anniversary next year).
    - Genndy Tartakovsky's upcoming series "Heist Brothers" (previously titled "Heist Safari") is officially greenlit for Adult Swim.
- June 29:
  - Adventure Time: Side Quests was released as a Hulu & Disney+ exclusive in the United States.
  - An eighth season of Daniel Tiger's Neighborhood was released.

=== July ===
- July 1:
  - Season 2 of X-Men '97 premiered on Disney+.
  - Illumination's Minions & Monsters was released.
  - Garfield and Friends, The Magic School Bus, Clifford the Big Red Dog and Clifford's Puppy Days were released on Paramount+ for the first time.
  - Several WB and Cartoon Network shows and specials like The Addams Family, Evil Con Carne, Dexter's Laboratory: Ego Trip, Ed, Edd n Eddy's Big Picture Show, the three Ed, Edd n Eddy holiday specials and Codename: Kids Next Door: Operation: Z.E.R.O. were removed from Tubi.
- July 3: Stan and Francine Smith from American Dad! were added as skins to Fortnite in honor of Independence Day.
- July 5: An anime series adaptation of Sparks of Tomorrow was released as a Netflix exclusive.
- July 10: The Patrick Star Show concludes its fourth season on Nickelodeon with the episodes "Doctor Patrick/Slumber Party Stars".
- July 11: The 13th Helluva Boss short, titled "Mission: Book Report", was released on YouTube.
- July 14: Nickelodeon celebrated their first official "SpongeBob Day", a holiday dedicated to the titular character's canonical birthday and Tom Kenny's birthday a day before.
- July 17: Season 5 of The Patrick Star Show began on Nickelodeon with the premiere of the episodes "Retreat!/Sidekick Search".
- July 20: Season 15 of King of the Hill premiered on Hulu.
- July 25: Paramount Pictures and Nickelodeon's Avatar Aang: The Last Airbender was released as a Paramount+ exclusive.
- July 26: The Rick and Morty spin-off President Curtis premiered on Adult Swim (and then on HBO Max the following day).
- July 29: The fourth and final season of The Proud Family: Louder and Prouder premiered on Disney+.
- July 31: Season 2 of Batman: Caped Crusader premiered on Amazon Prime Video.
- Unspecified: Former Cartoon Network & Warner Bros. Animation SVP Vishnu Athreya (who was infamously known for plaguing the CN schedule with constant reruns of Teen Titans Go! back in 2017) was appointed as EVP & President of Spin Master.

=== August ===
- August 3: Season 11 of Futurama began on Hulu with the premiere of the episode "Beef".
- August 5: Star Wars: Visions Presents – The Ninth Jedi premiered on Disney+ and Hulu.
- August 7: Alley Cats was released as a Netflix exclusive.
- August 12: An animated music video of the song "In the Ruins", by Mastodon, premiered on YouTube.
- August 14:
  - Paramount Animation and Nickelodeon's Paw Patrol: The Dino Movie was released.
  - The following was announced on the first day of this year's D23 from the following studios:
    - Disney: Zootopia 3 and Clay
    - Pixar: Coco 2 and a new original film titled Ghost Market
    - Disney Television Animation: Kingdom Hearts anime series
- August 21: Season 5 of Big City Greens premiered on Disney Channel and Disney XD simultaneously (and then on Disney+ the following day).
- August 28: Warner Animation Group's Coyote vs. Acme (a once-cancelled live-action animated film based on Ian Frazier's satirical article from The New Yorker about Wile E. Coyote and the Road Runner) was released in theaters by Ketchup Entertainment.

=== September ===
- September 4:
  - Zhang Gang's Tom and Jerry: Forbidden Compass was released in U.S. theaters.
  - Disney Pixar's Cars was re-released for its 20th anniversary.
- September 16: Season 29 of South Park (named "South America" for this season) began on Comedy Central with the premiere of the episode "South American Biker Gangs". Mike Judge reprises his role as Kenny (unmuffled) from Bigger, Longer & Uncut.
- September 17:
  - Optimus Prime: Awakening, a new 12-minute short, was released in theaters with the 40th anniversary re-release of The Transformers: The Movie. It marks the final time Peter Cullen voiced Optimus Prime before his death, Frank Welker reprises his roles as Megatron, and Soundwave.
  - Season 2 of Stranger Things: Tales from '85 premiered on Netflix.
- September 18: Aardman's Shaun the Sheep: The Beast of Mossy Bottom was released.
- September 21: The Futurama episode "A New New York Yankee in King Elfo's Court" premieres on Hulu, it is a crossover with Matt Groening's other series Disenchantment.
- September 25: DreamWorks Animation's Forgotten Island was released.
- September 27:
  - Season 38 of The Simpsons premiered on Fox.
  - Season 3 of Universal Basic Guys premiered on Fox.
  - Season 3 of Grimsburg premiered on Fox.
- September 28: Futurama concluded its revival run on Hulu with its 11th season finale "Final Ending: The Last Conclusion".
- September 30: Season 2 of Mickey Mouse Clubhouse+ premiered on Disney Channel & Disney Jr. in the United States.

=== October ===
- October 1: Season 3 of Pupstruction premiered on Disney Channel & Disney Jr. in the United States.
- October 2: Season 2 of Adventure Time: Side Quests was released as a Disney+ & Hulu exclusive in the United States.
- October 3: The fourteenth Helluva Boss short, titled "The Princess & The Pupper", premiered on YouTube.
- October 4:
  - Season 3 of the 2024 anime series remake of Rumiko Takahashi's Ranma ½ by MAPPA premiered on Japanese television, followed by its immediate Netflix debut shortly after.
  - Get Jiro! premiered on Adult Swim.
- October 5:
  - Adventure Time: Side Quests premiered internationally on Cartoon Network and HBO Max.
  - Family Guy's third exclusive Halloween special titled "Happy Hell-o-ween" was released as a Hulu exclusive. Kieran Culkin guest starred in this special as Satan.
  - Super Why's Comic Book Adventures premiered on PBS Kids.
- October 6:
  - Skydance now owns both Warner Bros. and Paramount.
  - The second standalone Kiff Halloween special "Scarm II: The Screamwriter" premiered simultaneously on Disney Channel and Disney XD (and then on Disney+ the following day), the episode is a sequel to the Season 1 Halloween special "Trevor's Rockin' Halloween Bash".
  - Season 6 of Phineas and Ferb began simultaneously on Disney Channel and Disney XD with the premiere of the Halloween special "Night of The Living Candace Suits/Terrors of the Altspace". It will release on Disney+ the following day.
- October 9:
  - Season 2 of Haunted Hotel premiered on Netflix.
  - Avatar: Seven Havens premiered on Paramount+.
  - Episode 2 of Knights of Guinevere, titled "Wolves Around the Corner", premiered on YouTube. The episode was dedicated to animator Luis De La Rosa, who sadly died after getting hit by a train while attending this year's Annecy film festival.
- October 10-11: Production files of various Cartoon Network & animated Warner Bros. series began leaking online, in which people are referring to as the "Cartoon Network Gigaleak".
- October 14: The first 3 episodes from the first half of Season 3 of Helluva Boss ("Turtle Emoji", "Bad Reputation", and "Gimpy Gimpy") premiered on Prime Video (and then the first episode will release on YouTube the following month).
- October 16: Charlie Morningstar, Vaggi, and Alastor the Radio Demon from Hazbin Hotel were added as skins to Fortnite as part of the Fortnitemares event.
- October 18: Apu Nahasapeemapetilon returns in The Simpsons episode "Treehouse of Horror Presents: The Revengening".
- October 21: Episodes 4 and 5 from Season 3 of Helluva Boss ("A Trial of Errors" and "The Auction") premiered on Prime Video.
- October 23:
  - Laika's Wildwood was released.
  - Glitch Productions officially greenlights Gameoverse for a full series.
- October 27: Season 2 of Zombies: The Re-Animated Series premiered on Disney Channel.
- October 28: Episodes 6 & 7 from Season 3 of Helluva Boss ("Return to Loo Loo Land" & "YES/NO") premiered on Prime Video and will then go on hiatus for the remainder of the year.
- October 31: The pilot for ZAMination's Calling All Villains premiered on YouTube (on the ZAMination channel).

=== November ===
- November 1: Season 7 of Miraculous: Tales of Ladybug & Cat Noir premiered on TF1 in France.
- November 6: Warner Bros. Pictures Animation's animated film The Cat in the Hat, based on the Dr. Seuss book of the same name, was released. It is accompanied by the Looney Tunes short Daffy Season, featuring one of Eric Bauza's final roles.
- November 15: The Simpsons episode "Dream Scenari-Moe" was released which features the late Eric Bauza as Mr. Fong and Harry Metsali.
- November 20: Netflix Animation Studios' Steps was released.
- November 25:
  - Walt Disney Animation Studios' Hexed, will be released, along with the Lilo & Stitch short Lilo & Scratch.
  - South Park will conclude its twenty-ninth season on Comedy Central
- November 26: The anime series adaptation of Kasumi Yasuda's Fool Night will be released as a Netflix exclusive.
- November 27: SpongeBob SquarePants will begin its eighteenth season with the one-hour Christmas special, "Merry Christmas, Mr. Plankton," on Nickelodeon and Paramount+.
- November 28: Teen Titans Go! will conclude its ninth season on Cartoon Network with the premiere of the three-part special "The Night Begins to Shine 3: Vinyl City," and it will mark the final time Greg Cipes will voice Beast Boy due to parkinson's disease.

=== December ===
- December 11: A new Garfield series will premiere on Paramount+.
- December 17: Ted: The Animated Series will premiere on Peacock. The series will take place 12 years after the events of Ted 2.
- December 18: Skydance Animation's Ray Gunn will be released as a Netflix exclusive.
- December 23: Paramount Pictures' The Angry Birds Movie 3 will be released.

=== Teased release date ===
- The Kiff special "The Oddest Sea" will premiere simultaneously on Disney Channel and Disney XD.

=== Specific date unknown ===
- Season 17 of Bob's Burgers will premiere on Fox.
- Season 25 of Family Guy will premiere on Fox.

== Awards ==
- Academy Award for Best Animated Feature: KPop Demon Hunters
- Academy Award for Best Animated Short Film: The Girl Who Cried Pearls
- American Cinema Editors Award for Best Edited Animated Feature Film: KPop Demon Hunters
- AnimaniA Awards for Best Movie: Cinematic Release:Demon Slayer: Kimetsu no Yaiba – The Movie: Infinity Castle
- Annecy International Animation Film Festival Cristal du long métrage: Paper Trail
- Annie Award for Best Animated Feature: KPop Demon Hunters
- Annie Award for Best Animated Feature – Independent: Arco
- Annie Award for Best Animated Television Production: Common Side Effects
- Astra Film Award for Animation is Cinema: Demon Slayer: Kimetsu no Yaiba – The Movie: Infinity Castle
- Astra Film Award for Best Animated Film: KPop Demon Hunters
- Astra TV Award for Best Animated Series: Hazbin Hotel
- Astra TV Award for Best Anime Series: Witch Hat Atelier
- Austin Film Critics Association Award for Best Animated Film: KPop Demon Hunters
- BAFTA Award for Best Animated Film: Zootopia 2
- BAFTA Award for Best Short Animation: Two Black Boys in Paradise
- Boston Society of Film Critics Award for Best Animated Film: Endless Cookie
- Central Ohio Film Critics Association Awards for Best Animated Feature: Little Amélie or the Character of Rain
- César Award for Best Animated Film: Arco
- Chicago Film Critics Association Award for Best Animated Film: KPop Demon Hunters
- Critics' Choice Awards Celebration of AAPI Cinema and Television For Animation Award: KPop Demon Hunters
- Critics' Choice Awards Celebration of AAPI Cinema and Television For International Animation Award: Demon Slayer: Kimetsu no Yaiba – The Movie: Infinity Castle
- Critics' Choice Movie Award for Best Animated Feature: KPop Demon Hunters
- Critics' Choice Television Award for Best Animated Series: South Park
- Crunchyroll Anime Award for Anime of the Year: My Hero Academia
- Crunchyroll Anime Award for Film of the Year: Demon Slayer: Kimetsu no Yaiba – The Movie: Infinity Castle
- Dallas–Fort Worth Film Critics Association Award for Best Animated Film: KPop Demon Hunters
- European Film Award for Best Animated Feature Film: Arco
- Florida Film Critics Circle Award for Best Animated Film: Little Amélie or the Character of Rain
- Golden Globe Award for Best Animated Feature Film: KPop Demon Hunters
- Golden Reel Award for Outstanding Achievement in Sound Editing – Sound Effects, Foley, Dialogue and ADR for Animated Feature Film: Zootopia 2
- Golden Tomato Awards for Best Animated Movie: Zootopia 2
- Golden Tomato Awards for Fan-Favorite Animated Movie:Demon Slayer: Kimetsu no Yaiba – The Movie: Infinity Castle
- Goya Award for Best Animated Film: Decorado
- Hochi Film Awards for Best Animated Picture: Demon Slayer: Kimetsu no Yaiba – The Movie: Infinity Castle
- Japan Academy Film Prize for Animation of the Year: Demon Slayer: Kimetsu no Yaiba – The Movie: Infinity Castle
- Japan Expo Awards for Best Feature Film:Chainsaw Man – The Movie: Reze Arc
- Kids' Choice Award for Favorite Animated Movie: Zootopia 2
- Los Angeles Film Critics Association Award for Best Animated Film: Little Amélie or the Character of Rain
- Las Vegas Film Critics Society Award For Best Animated Film: KPop Demon Hunters
- Minnesa Film Critics Alliance Award for Best Animated Feature: KPop Demon Hunters
- NAACP Image Award for Outstanding Animated Motion Picture: Zootopia 2
- National Board of Review Award for Best Animated Film: Arco
- New Mexico Film Critics Association Awards for Best Animated Film: Demon Slayer: Kimetsu no Yaiba – The Movie: Infinity Castle
- New York Film Critics Circle Award for Best Animated Film: KPop Demon Hunters
- Online Film Critics Society Award for Best Animated Film: KPop Demon Hunters
- Producers Guild of America Award for Best Animated Motion Picture: KPop Demon Hunters
- San Diego Film Critics Society Award for Best Animated Film: KPop Demon Hunters
- San Francisco Bay Area Film Critics Circle Award for Best Animated Feature: KPop Demon Hunters
- Saturn Award for Best Animated Film: Zootopia 2
- Saturn Award for Best international animated film: Demon Slayer: Kimetsu no Yaiba – The Movie: Infinity Castle
- Seattle Film Critics Society Award for Best Animated Feature: KPop Demon Hunters
- St. Louis Film Critics Association Award for Best Animated Feature: Zootopia 2
- Tokyo Anime Award: Demon Slayer: Kimetsu no Yaiba – The Movie: Infinity Castle
- Toronto Film Critics Association Award for Best Animated Film: Endless Cookie
- Visual Effects Society Award for Outstanding Visual Effects in an Animated Feature: KPop Demon Hunters
- Washington D.C. Area Film Critics Association Award for Best Animated Feature: KPop Demon Hunters

== Television series debuts ==
Date	Title	Channel, Streaming
January 4	Journal with Witch	BS Asahi, Crunchyroll
January 11	You and I Are Polar Opposites	MBS, TBS, Crunchyroll
January 13	Hey A.J.!	Disney Jr., Disney+
January 24	CoComelon Playdates with Sanrio Friends	YouTube
February 2	Phoebe & Jay	PBS Kids
February 20	Strip Law	Netflix
March 2	BeddyByes	Disney Jr.
March 15	Rooster Fighter	Adult Swim, HBO Max
March 23	Magicampers	Disney Jr.
April 2	The Ramparts of Ice	Netflix
April 4	Daemons of the Shadow Realm	Tokyo MX, Crunchyroll, Netflix, Hulu
April 4	Akane-banashi	ANN (TV Asahi), Netflix
April 6	Star Wars: Maul – Shadow Lord	Disney+
April 6	Witch Hat Atelier	Tokyo MX, Crunchyroll, Netflix
April 14	Nippon Sangoku	Tokyo MX, BS NTV, Amazon Prime Video
April 20	Kevin	Prime Video
April 23	Stranger Things: Tales from '85	Netflix
April 24	My Brother the Minotaur	Apple TV
May 11	Regular Show: The Lost Tapes	Cartoon Network, HBO Max (Note: International only; will release on the service in the United States on June 8th.)
May 15	Gameoverse	YouTube
May 22	Mating Season	Netflix
May 22	Pac-Man: Snack Breaks	YouTube
May 25	Sofia the First: Royal Magic	Disney Jr., Disney+
May 27	My Two Cents	Netflix
June 5	Among Us	Paramount+
June 9	Dragon Striker	Disney XD, Disney+
June 26	The Doomies	Disney+
June 29	Adventure Time: Side Quests	Hulu
July 5	Sparks of Tomorrow	Netflix
July 6	Jaadugar: A Witch in Mongolia	TV Asahi, Crunchyroll
July 7	The Ghost in the Shell	Kansai TV, Fuji TV, Prime Video
July 24	Breaking Bear	Tubi
July 24	Teeny Mutant Ninja Turtles	Nickelodeon, Nick Jr.
July 26	President Curtis	Adult Swim, HBO Max
August 5	Star Wars: Vision Presents - The Ninth Jedi	Disney+, Hulu
August 7	Alley Cats	Netflix
September 8	Dang!	Netflix
September 16	Golden Axe	Paramount+
October 3	Get Jiro!	Adult Swim, HBO Max
October 5	Super Why's Comic Book Adventures	PBS Kids
October 9	Avatar: Seven Havens	Paramount+
October 16	Strawberry Shortcake's Bake Shop	YouTube
October 31	Calling All Villains	YouTube
November 3	Bass X Machina	Netflix
November 9	Doozie's Doghouse	Netflix
November 26	Fool Night	Netflix
December 11	Garfield	Paramount+
December 17	Ted: The Animated Series	Peacock
December 18	Living the Dream	Netflix
TBA	HexVets and Magic Pets	Nickelodeon, Nick Jr.

== Television series endings ==
Date	Title	Channel, Streaming	Year	Notes
January 12	Xavier Riddle and the Secret Museum	PBS Kids	2019–2026	Ended
February 20	Strip Law	Netflix	2026	Cancelled
March 7	Beastars	Netflix	2019–2026	Ended
April 12	Smiling Friends	Adult Swim, HBO Max	2022–2026	Ended
April 19	Skillsville	PBS Kids	2025–2026	Ended
April 20	Kevin	Prime Video	2026	Cancelled
May 31	Rooster Fighter	Adult Swim, HBO Max	2026	Ended
June 14	Rugrats (2021)	Paramount+, Nickelodeon, Nicktoons	2021–2026	Ended
June 19 (Note: Premiered in selected theaters on June 4, two weeks ahead of its YouTube release.)	The Amazing Digital Circus	YouTube/Netflix	2023–2026	Ended
July 29	The Proud Family: Louder and Prouder	Disney Channel, Disney XD, Disney+	2022–2026	Ended
October 12	Rock Paper Scissors	Nickelodeon	2024–2026	Cancelled
October 23	Max & the Midknights	Nickelodeon	2024–2026	Ended
TBA	Iron Man and His Awesome Friends	Disney Jr., Disney+	2025–2026	Cancelled

== Television season premieres ==
Date	Title	Season	Channel, Streaming
January 11	Primal	3	Adult Swim, HBO Max
February 9	The Creature Cases	7	Netflix
February 22	American Dad!	22	Fox (Note: Returned to Fox after airing on TBS from 2014 to 2025.)
February 27	The Loud House	11	Nickelodeon
March 2	Gabby's Dollhouse	13	Netflix
March 18	Invincible	4	Prime Video
March 21	Iyanu	2	Cartoon Network, HBO Max
April 1	Dorohedoro	2	Netflix, Crunchyroll
April 2	The Bad Guys: The Series	2	Netflix
April 2	Ninjago: Dragons Rising	4	Netflix
May 9	Chibiverse	4	Disney Channel, Disney XD
May 12	Devil May Cry	2	Netflix
May 24	Rick and Morty	9	Adult Swim
June 3	The Legend of Vox Machina	4	Prime Video
June 12	SpongeBob SquarePants	17	Nickelodeon
June 13	My Adventures with Superman	3	Adult Swim, HBO Max
June 19	Rock Paper Scissors	3	Nickelodeon
June 26	Camp Snoopy	2	Apple TV
July 1	X-Men '97	2	Disney+
July 10	Mr. Men Little Miss Mini Adventures	2	YouTube
July 17	The Patrick Star Show	5	Nickelodeon
July 20	King of the Hill	15	Hulu
July 29	The Proud Family: Louder and Prouder	4	Disney+
July 31	Batman: Caped Crusader	2	Prime Video
August 3	Futurama	14	Hulu
August 21	Big City Greens	5	Disney Channel, Disney XD
September 16	South Park (Note: Named "South America" for this season.)	29	Comedy Central
September 17	Stranger Things: Tales from '85	2	Netflix
September 27	The Simpsons	38	Fox
September 27	Universal Basic Guys	3	Fox
September 27	Grimsburg	3	Fox
September 30	Mickey Mouse Clubhouse+	2	Disney Channel, Disney Jr.
October 1	Pupstruction	3	Disney Channel, Disney Jr.
October 2	Adventure Time: Side Quests	2	Hulu, Disney+
October 4	Ranma ½	3	Nippon TV, Netflix
October 6	Phineas and Ferb	6	Disney Channel, Disney XD
October 9	Haunted Hotel	2	Netflix
October 12	The Patrick Star Show	6	Nickelodeon
October 14	Helluva Boss	3	Prime Video, YouTube
October 14	Beavis and Butt-Head	12	Comedy Central
October 27	Zombies: The Re-Animated Series	2	Disney Channel
November 27	SpongeBob SquarePants	18	Nickelodeon

== Television season finales ==
Date	Title	Season	Channel, Streaming
January 16	Phineas and Ferb	5	Disney Channel, Disney XD
February 15	The Simpsons	37	Fox
March 15	Primal	3	Adult Swim, HBO Max
April 12	Universal Basic Guys	2	Fox
April 19	Krapopolis	3	Fox
April 22	Invincible	4	Prime Video
May 4	Star Wars: Maul - Shadow Lord	1	Disney+
May 17	Family Guy	24	Fox
May 17	Bob's Burgers	16	Fox
May 17	American Dad!	22	Fox
June 5	SpongeBob SquarePants	16	Nickelodeon
June 12	Rock Paper Scissors	2	Nickelodeon
June 24	The Legend of Vox Machina	4	Prime Video
June 29	Adventure Time: Side Quests	1	Hulu, Disney+
July 10	The Patrick Star Show	4	Nickelodeon
July 20	King of the Hill	15	Hulu
July 26	Rick and Morty	9	Adult Swim
July 31	Mr. Men Little Miss Mini Adventures	2	YouTube
August 12	X-Men '97	2	Disney+
September 27	President Curtis	1	Adult Swim, HBO Max
September 28	Futurama	14	Hulu
October 23	The Patrick Star Show	5	Nickelodeon
October 30	Avatar: Seven Havens	1	Paramount+
November 20	SpongeBob SquarePants	17	Nickelodeon
November 25	South Park (Note: Named "South America" for this season.)	29	Comedy Central
November 28	Teen Titans Go!	9	Cartoon Network

== Deaths ==
=== January ===
- January 4: Donald C. Rogers, American sound engineer (The Secret of NIMH), dies at age 94.
- January 8: Guy Moon, American composer (Cartoon All-Stars to the Rescue, Hanna-Barbera, Nickelodeon Animation Studio, Grim & Evil, The Adventures of Rocky and Bullwinkle, Johnny Test), dies at age 63.
- January 9:
  - Bill Millar, English visual effect artist and animator (The Transformers: The Movie, G.I. Joe: The Movie), dies at age 79.
  - T. K. Carter, American actor (voice of Alex in Turbo Teen, Monstar Nawt in Space Jam, Anthony Julian in Jem, Rocksteady in The Transformers episode "Auto-Bop", Sledgehammer O'Possum in the What a Cartoon! episode "Sledgehammer O'Possum: What's Going on Back There?"), dies at age 69.
  - Ted Nichols, American composer (Hanna-Barbera), dies at age 97.
- January 13: Scott Adams, American cartoonist and producer (Dilbert) dies at age 68.
- January 14: Gloria Rocha, Mexican voice actress (Latin American dub voice of Olive Oyl in Popeye, Sorceress in He-Man and the Masters of the Universe and She-Ra: Princess of Power, Tweety in Looney Tunes, Melody in Josie and the Pussycats, Velma Dinkley in Scooby-Doo), dies at age 94.
- January 16:
  - Yoichiro Yoshikawa, Japanese composer (ViVid Strike), dies at age 68.
  - Mark Jones, American director, screenwriter (Super Friends, Saturday Supercade, Skysurfer Strike Force, Mister T, Heathcliff, Wild West C.O.W.-Boys of Moo Mesa, Captain Caveman and the Teen Angels, James Bond Jr., Rubik, the Amazing Cube, The Puppy's Further Adventures) and producer (Rubik, the Amazing Cube, The Puppy's Further Adventures), dies at age 72.
  - Kianna Underwood, American actress (voice of Fuchsia Glover in Little Bill), dies at age 33.
- January 18: Roger Allers, American director (The Lion King, Open Season, The Prophet), screenwriter (The Emperor's New Groove, Brother Bear, Aladdin, Beauty and the Beast,The Lion King 1½, The Little Matchgirl), and animator, (Animalympics, Rock & Rule, Open Season, The Little Mermaid, Little Nemo: Adventures in Slumberland), dies at age 76.
- January 19: Stefan Gossler, German actor (German dub voice of Master Monkey in the Kung Fu Panda franchise, King Julien in the Madagascar franchise, Splinter in Teenage Mutant Ninja Turtles: Mutant Mayhem, Cell in Dragon Ball Z), dies at age 70.
- January 20: Kōzō Shioya, Japanese voice actor (voice of Majin Buu in Dragon Ball Z), dies at age 70.
- January 22: Hudson Talbott, American author and animator (We're Back! A Dinosaur's Story), dies at age 76.
- January 24:
  - Alexis Ortega, Mexican voice actor (Latin American dub voice of Spider-Man in Spider-Man, Guardians of the Galaxy and Marvel Super Hero Adventures, Tadashi Hamada in Big Hero 6 and Big Hero 6: The Series, Ryan "Inside" Laney in Cars 3, Jack in Goldie & Bear), dies at age 38.
  - Maureen Shelleau, Canadian animator (Nelvana) dies at 65.
- January 25: Gabe Lopez, American composer (Dora, Trolls: TrollsTopia), dies at age 48.
- January 28: Bryan Loren, American songwriter (wrote "Do the Bartman" for The Simpsons), dies at age 59. (Note: Some sources mislabel his age as "58".)
- January 29: Kenneth Hyman, American studio executive (Warner Bros.-Seven Arts), dies at age 97.
- January 30: Catherine O'Hara, Canadian-American actress (voice of Sally and Shock in The Nightmare Before Christmas, Ludmilla in Bartok the Magnificent, Tina in Chicken Little, Kaossandra in Skylanders Academy, Skaelka in The Last Kids on Earth, Aunt Tennelli in The Magic School Bus Rides Again, Susan Frankenstein, Gym Teacher and Weird Girl in Frankenweenie, Judith in Where the Wild Things Are, Kata in Brother Bear 2, Penny in Over the Hedge, Miss Malone in The Completely Mental Misadventures of Ed Grimley, Aunt Edith in Rock & Rule, Brooke Ripple in Elemental, Malicious in Witch's Night Out, Mom in Monster House, Pinktail in The Wild Robot, Morgana in the Sofia the First episode "Gone With the Wand", Gwendolyn Swish in the Central Park episode "The PAIGE-riarchy!"), dies at age 71.

=== February ===
- February 4: Ricardo Schnetzer, Brazilian voice actor (Brazilian dub voice of Ares and Hades in Justice League Unlimited, Lancelot in Shrek the Third, Spider-Man Noir in Spider-Man: Into the Spider-Verse, Master Monkey in Kung Fu Panda, Captain Planet in Captain Planet and the Planeteers, Deathstroke in Teen Titans Go! To the Movies, Teen Titans, Justice League: The Flashpoint Paradox, Son of Batman and Teen Titans: The Judas Contract, Benson Dunwoody in Regular Show, Hank in Dungeons & Dragons), dies at age 72.
- February 5: Eladio González Garza, Mexican voice actor (Latin American dub voice of Robin, The Atom, The Flash, Bizarro, Captain Cold, Gorilla Grodd and Hawkman in Super Friends, The Joker in The New Adventures of Batman, Jimmy Olsen in Superman, Ronald Radford III in Fred and Barney Meet the Thing, Lok in Valley of the Dinosaurs, Station in Lloyd in Space), dies at age 89.
- February 10: Shelly Desai, American actor (voice of Crenshaw in the Archer episode "Mole Hunt"), dies at age 90.
- February 11:
  - James Van Der Beek, American actor (voice of Boris in Vampirina, Jonathan "Mox" Moxon in the Robot Chicken episode "Message Chair", English dub voice of Pazu in Castle in the Sky), dies at age 48.
  - Bud Cort, American actor and comedian (voice of Toyman in the DC Animated Universe, Tempest in The Mask: Animated Series, The King in The Little Prince, Josiah Wormwood in the Batman: The Animated Series episode "The Cape and Cowl Conspiracy"), dies at age 77.
- February 13:
  - Friedhelm Ptok, German actor (German dub voice of Palpatine in Star Wars: The Clone Wars and Star Wars Rebels, Alfred Pennyworth in Batman: The Long Halloween, Dad in Secrets of the Furious Five), dies at age 92.
  - Dolores Muñoz Ledo, Mexican voice actress (Latin American dub voice of Chip in Chip 'n Dale: Rescue Rangers, Sorceress in He-Man and the Masters of the Universe), dies at age 107.
- February 14: Tom Noonan, American actor (voice of Principal in Hair High, Everyone else in Anomalisa, Phil's Dad in the Animals. episode "The Democratic People's Republic of Kitty City"), dies at age 74.
- February 15:
  - James G. Robinson, American studio executive (Morgan Creek Entertainment), dies at age 90.
  - Pino Colizzi, Italian actor and voice actor (Italian dub voice of Charlie B. Barkin in All Dogs Go to Heaven, Robin Hood in Robin Hood), dies at age 88.
- February 16: Jane Baer, Canadian-American animator (The Great Mouse Detective, Who Framed Roger Rabbit, Mickey's Christmas Carol, Rover Dangerfield, Tom and Jerry: The Movie, Sleeping Beauty, Beauty and the Beast, Hot Wheels), dies at age 91.
- February 17: Jesse Jackson, American civil rights activist and politician (voice of Cocky Locky in the Happily Ever After: Fairy Tales for Every Child episode "Henny Penny"), dies at age 84.
- February 19: Eric Dane, American actor (voiced himself in the Family Guy episode "Veteran Guy"), dies at age 53.
- February 21: G.G. Santiago, American animator (Rainbow Brite and the Star Stealer), dies at age 82.
- February 23:
  - Gary Dontzig, American screenwriter (W.I.T.C.H.), dies at age 79.
  - Robert Carradine, American actor (voice of Lewis Skolnick in the Robot Chicken episode "Boo Cocky"), dies at age 71.
- February 25: Michael Halperin, American screenwriter (He-Man and the Masters of the Universe, Challenge of the GoBots), dies at age 91.

=== March ===
- March 1: Clément Oubrerie, French comic artist, director, producer, screenwriter and animator (The Rabbi's Cat, Aya of Yop City), dies at age 59.
- March 2: Stephen Hibbert, American screenwriter (Darkwing Duck, Tiny Toon Adventures, Animaniacs, Shrek), dies at age 68.
- March 3:
  - Masako Ikeda, Japanese voice actress (voice of Maetel in Galaxy Express 999, Chimera Ant Queen in Hunter × Hunter, Sharon in Space Brothers, Nanaka no Oba in Myself; Yourself, Fuyuka Liqueur in Silent Möbius, Nodoka Saotome in Ranma ½, Japanese dub voice of Charlotte in Charlotte's Web, Hera in Hercules), dies at age 87.
  - Bob Rosenfarb, American screenwriter (Heathcliff, Defenders of the Earth, The Get Along Gang, The Wuzzles), dies at age 74.
- March 4: Michael Donovan, Canadian voice actor (voice of Eggplant Wizard in Captain N: The Game Master, Sir Darren in King Arthur and the Knights of Justice, Sabretooth in X-Men: Evolution, X in Mega Man, El Rey in ¡Mucha Lucha!, Guile and Zangief in Street Fighter, Dojo Kanojo Cho in Xiaolin Chronicles, Zoukien Mato in Fate/Zero, Suikotsu in Inuyasha, Ryoga Hibiki in Ranma ½), dies at age 72.
- March 5:
  - Yonehiko Kitagawa, Japanese voice actor (voice of Chairman Harabote Muscle in Kinnikuman, Cat Sailor B in Animal Treasure Island, Farmer in Hana no Ko Lunlun, President of Earth in Space Battleship Yamato III, Patrol Chief in Hashire Melos!, Hans in Future War 198X, Boss in Andromeda Stories, Dr. Dinessen in Galactic Gale Baxinger, al-Salem in Legend of the Galactic Heroes), dies at age 94.
  - Jane Lapotaire, English actress (voice of Sarah in the Testament: The Bible in Animation episode "Abraham"), dies at age 81.
- March 6: Tsutomu Shibayama, Japanese anime director (Doraemon, Ranma ½), animator (God Mazinger) and storyboard artist (Doraemon, Ranma ½), dies at age 84.
- March 9: Yukie Maeda, Japanese voice actress (voice of Alpha Q in Transformers: Energon, Onsen Tamago and Sachiyo Matsumoto in Love Hina), dies at age 52.
- March 15:
  - Sam Kieth, American comics artist and screenwriter (What a Cartoon!), dies at age 63.
  - Bruno Salomone, French actor (voice of Nico in A Cat in Paris, Felix's father in Santa's Apprentice, Albert in A Monster in Paris, Karl in Yellowbird, Manole in Marona's Fantastic Tale, French dub voice of Syndrome in The Incredibles, Zoc in The Ant Bully, Rick in Happily N'Ever After), dies at age 55.
- March 16:
  - Kiki Shepard, American television host (voice of Polly in the Oh Yeah! Cartoons segment "Jamal the Funny Frog" and Naomi in the segment "That's My Pop!"), dies at age 74.
  - Sally Grace, English actress (voice of Weasel and Owl in The Animals of Farthing Wood, Mrs. Wicket in Mr. Bean: The Animated Series), dies at age 74.
- March 17: Sam Semon, American studio executive (CBS, Gaumont Television, NBCUniversal, Amazon MGM Studios), dies at age 60.
- March 18: Tom Georgeson, British actor (voice of Jacob in the Animated Tales of the World episode "The Enchanted Lion: A Story from Germany"), dies at age 89.
- March 19: Chuck Norris, American martial artist and actor (voiced himself in Karate Kommandos), dies at age 86.
- March 20:
  - Jessie Jones, American actress and screenwriter (Teacher's Pet), dies at age 75.
  - Nicholas Brendon, American actor (voice of Huntsboy 89 in American Dragon: Jake Long), dies at age 54.
- March 24: Barry Caldwell, American artist (Animaniacs, Pinky and the Brain, Tiny Toons, The Smurfs), dies at age 68.
- March 25: Esther Roord, Dutch actress (Dutch dub voice of Joan Rivers in Shrek 2), dies at age 61.
- March 28: Richard Donat, Canadian actor (voice of Deej in Star Wars: Ewoks, Big Hawk in Trailer Park Boys: The Animated Series), dies at age 84.

=== April ===
- April 4: Arne Olsen, Canadian screenwriter (All Dogs Go to Heaven 2), dies at age 64.
- April 10: Sid Krofft, Canadian-American puppeteer (H.R. Pufnstuf, Land of the Lost) and screenwriter (H.R. Pufnstuf, Land of the Lost), dies at age 96.
- April 14: Kazuo Ebisawa, Japanese animator (G.I. Joe: The Movie, The Transformers: The Movie, Grendizer, Queen Millennia, Nausicaä of the Valley of the Wind, Little Nemo: Adventures in Slumberland, Kiki's Delivery Service, Tiny Toon Adventures: How I Spent My Vacation, Romeo × Juliet, Wakko's Wish, Akira), dies at age 72-73.
- April 17:
  - Nathalie Baye, French actress (French dub voice of The Queen in The Ant Bully), dies at age 77.
  - Carlos Becerril, Mexican voice actor (Latin American dub voice of Fancy-Fancy in Top Cat, Chick Hicks in the Cars franchise), dies at age 90.
- April 18:
  - Wakana Yamazaki, Japanese voice actress (voice of Noriko in One Piece, Ran Mouri in Case Closed), dies at age 61.
  - Rif Hutton, American actor (voice of Crewman #1 in Tugger: The Jeep 4x4 Who Wanted to Fly, Metro City Sergeant in Astro Boy, DJ in The Princess and the Frog, Blithe Hollow Townsperson in ParaNorman, Lord Farquaad's Guards in Shrek, High Official in Kingsglaive: Final Fantasy XV, Cop #1 in The Twits, Fish in Shark Tale, Crowd Member in Madagascar, provided additional voices for Osmosis Jones, The Madagascar Penguins in a Christmas Caper, Curious George, Open Season 3, Epic, Mr. Peabody & Sherman, Ice Age: Collision Course, Resident Evil: Vendetta, The Star, Spider-Man: Into the Spider-Verse, Paws of Fury: The Legend of Hank, The Wind Rises, The Tale of Desperaux, Lightyear), dies at age 73.
- April 19: Gianni Quillico, Italian actor (Italian dub voice of Spider-Man in Spider-Man 1967 and Spider-Man 1981, Kobra Khan in He-Man and the Masters of the Universe, Greed in Fullmetal Alchemist, Caesar Clown in One Piece, Leonard Powers in Ugly Americans, Musashi in Gintama, Nariyoshi Tokugawa in Hell's Paradise, Taisho Sushiya in Beyblade X), dies at age 79.
- April 20: Alan Osmond, American singer and musician (voiced himself in The Osmonds), dies at age 76.
- April 22: Michael Tilson Thomas, American composer (Bugs and Daffy's Carnival of the Animals), dies at age 81.
- April 24:
  - Tatsuo Sato, Japanese screenwriter (Martian Successor Nadesico, Cat Soup), director (Akazukin Chacha, Martin Successor Nadesico, Cat Soup, Ninja Scroll: The Series), producer (Sister Princess, Azumanga Daioh), and storyboard artist (Martian Successor Nadesico, Shaman King, Azumanga Daioh, Ninja Scroll: The Series), dies at age 61.
  - Benoît Rousseau, Canadian actor (French Canadian dub voice of Hamm in Toy Story, Abe Simpson, Kirk van Houten and Mr. Burns in The Simpsons, Krypto, Black Adam and Anubis in DC League of Super-Pets, Spider-Man Noir in Spider-Man: Into the Spider-Verse, Superman in Teen Titans Go! To the Movies, Lord MacGuffin in Brave), dies at age 66.
- April 25: Bill Wise, American actor (voice of Knuckles the Echidna in Sonic the Hedgehog: The Movie, Screenslaver in Incredibles 2), dies at age 61.
- April 26: Gerry Conway, American comic book writer and screenwriter (My Little Pony, The Transformers, G.I. Joe: A Real American Hero, Dino-Riders, The Centurions, Dinosaucers, Batman: The Animated Series, Spider-Man), dies at age 73.
- April 27: Steve Maslow, American sound mixer (Thumbelina, A Troll in Central Park, The Pagemaster, The Pebble and the Penguin, Balto, Cats Don't Dance, Antz), dies at age 81.
- April 29: David Allan Coe, American singer (voiced himself in the Squidbillies episode "The Okaleechee Dam Jam"), dies at age 86.

=== May ===
- May 4:
  - Yuji Ohno, Japanese composer (Lupin III, Space Adventure Cobra, Mighty Orbots), dies at age 84.
  - Jorge Calandrelli, Argentine composer (The Great Mouse Detective), dies at age 86.
- May 5: Yevhen Syvokin, Soviet and Ukrainian director (Fragments, The Man Who Could Fly, The Tale of Good Rhino, Fraction), dies at age 88.
- May 6: Ted Turner, American entrepreneur, television producer, media proprietor and philanthropist (Cartoon Network, founder of Turner Broadcasting System, co-creator of Captain Planet and the Planeteers), dies at age 87.
- May 10: David Burke, British actor (voice of the Narrator in the Shakespeare: The Animated Tales episode "As You Like It", God in the Testament: The Bible in Animation episode "Creation and the Flood", Goat-Kneed Commander in the Animated Tales of the World episode "The Shepherdess and the Chimney Sweep: A Story From Denmark"), dies at age 91.
- May 11: Abdul Rahman Abu Zahra, Egyptian actor (Egyptian dub voice of Scar in The Lion King, Jafar in Aladdin), dies at age 92.
- May 12:
  - Izo Hashimoto, Japanese screenwriter (Akira), dies at age 72.
  - Donald Gibb, American actor (voice of Bromanor in the Secret Mountain Fort Awesome episode "The 6th Disgustoid"), dies at age 71.
  - Stanisława Celińska, Polish actress (Polish dub voice of Ursula in The Little Mermaid, Morgana in The Little Mermaid II: Return to the Sea, Mama Odie in The Princess and the Frog), dies at age 79.
  - Rex Reed, American film critic and actor (voiced himself in The Critic), dies at age 87.
  - Jack Taylor, American actor (English dub voice of Prince Finlap in Guliver's Travels, Kyochi Saionji in Adolescence of Utena), dies at age 99.
- May 14: Takahiro Fujiwara, Japanese voice actor (voice of Mokoena and Alan in Jormungand, Security Guard in Aikatsu!, Fortitudo in Bayonetta: Bloody Fate, Dwalla in Outbreak Company, Chandragupta in Nobunaga the Fool, Besub in Gaist Crusher, Setter in Captain Earth, Lu Gonghu in The Irregular at Magic High School, Ekichi Nebuya in Kuroko's Basketball, Ojisan in Attack on Titan, King Baum and Charlotte Basskarte in One Piece, Funamishi in Boruto, Orc in Edens Zero, Kurogiri/Fourth Kind in My Hero Academia, Japanese dub voice of Marshmallow in Frozen), dies at age 43.
- May 18: Tom Kane, American voice actor (voice of Professor Utonium, Him, and Talking Dog in The Powerpuff Girls, Darwin Thornberry in The Wild Thornberrys, Lord Monkey Fist in Kim Possible, Mr. Herriman in Foster's Home for Imaginary Friends, Yoda in the Star Wars franchise, Magneto in Wolverine and the X-Men, Iron Man in Next Avengers: Heroes of Tomorrow, Ultron in Next Avengers: Heroes of Tomorrow and The Avengers: Earth's Mightiest Heroes, Guard #1 in Shrek the Third, Doctor Doom in the Spider-Man episode "Secret Wars, Chapter 3: Doom"), dies at age 64.
- May 21: Judith Chalmers, English television presenter (voice of Judith Poodle in Rex the Runt), dies at age 90.
- May 23: Dame Jools Topp, New Zealand musician and comedian (voice of Sue Witherwax in The Barefoot Bandits episode "Terracotta Terror"), dies at age 68.
- May 24:
  - Gary Foster, American composer (DuckTales the Movie: Treasure of the Lost Lamp, Aladdin, A Bug's Life, Monsters, Inc., Finding Nemo, The Adventures of Tintin, The Hunchback of Notre Dame, Ice Age, Robots, Chicken Little), dies at age 89.
  - Jordi Amorós, Spanish animator (Koki), dies at age 82.
- May 25:
  - Brian Johnson, British special effects artist (Thunderbirds), dies at age 86.
  - Gary L. Pudney, American television executive (ABC), dies at age 91.
  - Robin Hurlstone, British actor (voice of Walter Boggis in Fantastic Mr. Fox), dies at age 68.
- May 26: Howard Storm, American director and actor (voice of Commercial Director in the Duckman episode "They Craved Duckman's Brain!"), dies at age 94.

=== June ===
- June 1: Anthony Head, English actor (voice of Alfred Pennyworth in Batman: Gotham by Gaslight, Professor Third in Fillmore!, Rupert Giles and Albus Dumbledore in the Robot Chicken episode "Endgame", Wizard Con in the Adventure Time: Distant Lands episode "Wizard City"), dies at age 72.
- June 2: Peabo Bryson, American musician (Beauty and the Beast, Beauty and the Beast: The Enchanted Christmas, Aladdin) and actor (voice of National Anthem Singer in the King of the Hill episode "Meet the Manger Babies"), dies at age 75.
- June 3: Max Kleven, Norwegian-born American second unit director (Who Framed Roger Rabbit), dies at age 92.
- June 4: Marjane Satrapi, French-Iranian director (Persepolis) and actress (voice of Schloss in Persepolis, herself in The Simpsons episode "Springfield Splendor"), dies at age 56.
- June 6: William Hasley, American screenwriter (The Smurfs, Fat Albert and the Cosby Kids), dies at age 78.
- June 9:
  - Tamao Nakamura, Japanese actress (voice of Shige's Friend in My Neighbors the Yamadas), dies at age 86.
  - Sophie Faucher, Canadian actress (Canadian dub voice of Yzma in The Emperor's New Groove and Kronk's New Groove, Morgana in The Little Mermaid II: Return to the Sea, Prudence in Cinderella III: A Twist in Time), dies at age 68.
- June 11: Margaret Kerry, American actress (voice of Mermaid in Peter Pan), and inspiration and model for Tinker Bell in Peter Pan, dies at age 97.
- June 12:
  - Ronnie Schell, American actor (voice of Jason in Battle of the Planets, Gilly in Goober and the Ghost Chasers, Rick the Racoon in Shirt Tales, Pushover Smurf in The Smurfs episode "The Smurf Who Couldn't Say No", Freako in Scooby-Doo Meets the Boo Brothers, Colonel Calloway in Scooby-Doo and the Ghoul School, Master Fezzick in The Legend of Prince Valiant, Rudy 2 in Jetsons the Movie, Eddie in Rover Dangerfield, Mayor Fitzhugh in Recess), dies at age 94.
  - Gene Shalit, American journalist, television personality, critic and author (voice of Gene Scallop in the SpongeBob SquarePants episode "The Krusty Sponge", himself in The Critic episodes "Pilot", "Marty's First Date" and "Siskel and Ebert & Jay & Alice"), dies at age 100.
- June 13: Flor Vargas, Colombian actress (voice of Queen in Bolívar el héroe), dies at age 98.
- June 14: Oliver Tree, American musician (voice of Zane in the Royal Crackers episode "Craftopia"), dies at age 32.
- June 16: Daveigh Chase, American actress, singer and model (voice of Lilo Pelekai in the Lilo & Stitch franchise, Joyce Summit and Tracy Manbini in Fillmore!, Betsy in Betsy's Kindergarten Adventures, English dub voice of Chihiro Ogino in Spirited Away), dies at age 35.
- June 20: Akihiro Miwa, Japanese singer and actor (voice of Arceus in Pokémon: Arceus and the Jewel of Life, Witch of the Waste in Howl's Moving Castle, Moro-no-kimi in Princess Mononoke), dies at age 91.
- June 21: Jeff Olson, American special effects artist (Who Framed Roger Rabbit), dies at age 77.
- June 22: Joaquim Casado, Spanish voice actor (Spanish dub voice of Doctor Onishi in Akira), dies at an unspecified age.
- June 24: Luis de la Rosa, Mexican animator (My Little Pony: The Movie, Night at the Museum: Kahmunrah Rises Again, Space Jam: A New Legacy, Spider-Man: Across the Spider-Verse, Knights of Guinevere, Carmen Sandiego, Cloudy with a Chance of Meatballs, Animaniacs), dies at age 34.
- June 29: Penelope Keith, English actress (voice of Nana Poo-Poo in The Secret Show episode "Commando Babies", Queen Bee in the Tinga Tinga Tales episode "Why Bees Sting"), dies at age 86.
- June 30: Irén Henrik, Hungarian cinematographer (Mattie the Goose-boy), dies at age 89.

=== July ===
- July 1: Moritz Borman, German-born American producer (The Little Prince, Playmobil: The Movie), dies at age 71.
- July 3: Yukiko Nikaido, Japanese actress (voice of Fujiko Mine in Lupin the 3rd Part I), dies at age 85.
- July 9: Don Iwerks, American studio executive (Disney), dies at age 96.
- July 10: Wai Ching Ho, Hong Kong actress (voice of Grandma Wu in Turning Red), dies at age 82.
- July 13: Sam Neill, New Zealand actor, director, producer and screenwriter (voice of Sam Sawnoff in The Magic Pudding, Allomere in Legend of the Guardians: The Owls of Ga'Hoole, Frankie Scales in Daisy Quokka: World's Scariest Animal, Dr. Maybe in Scarygirl, Tommy Brock in Peter Rabbit and Peter Rabbit 2: The Runaway, Molloy in The Simpsons episode "Homer the Vigilante", Monogatron Leader in the Rick and Morty episode "The Old Man and the Seat"), dies at age 78.
- July 14: Cees Geel, Dutch actor (Dutch dub voice of Russ Cargill in The Simpsons Movie, Lord Garmadon in The Lego Ninjago Movie), dies at age 61.
- July 15: Plas Johnson, American composer (The Pink Panther), dies at age 94.
- July 18: Jim Gilstrap, American singer and session musician (performed the theme song from TaleSpin), dies at age 79.
- July 19: Patrick Gleeson, American composer (Star Wars: Droids, Star Wars: Ewoks, The Plague Dogs), dies at age 91.
- July 20:
  - Katsushi Murakami, Japanese animator (Ulysses 31) and producer (Super Dimensional Fortress Macross II: Lovers Again), dies at age 83.
  - Joachim Kerzel, German actor (German dub voice of AUTO in WALL-E), dies at age 84.
- July 22: Chuck Russell, American director, producer and screenwriter (played himself in the Space Ghost Coast to Coast episode "The Mask", and created The Mask movie which later got an animated adaptation), dies at age 74.
- July 25: Bill Oddie, English actor (voice of Sweep in The Willows in Winter, Crow, Chief O'Reilly, Doctor Gloom and Rembrandt in Bananaman, English dub voice of Asterix in Asterix and the Big Fight), dies at age 85.
- July 27: Phyllida Law, Scottish actress (English dub voice of Sadako in the Optimum dub of Arrietty), dies at age 94.
- July 29:
  - Carol Lynn Pearson, American author and screenwriter (Thumbelina), dies at age 86.
  - Glen Hansard, Irish musician and actor (voice of Irish Guy in The Simpsons episode "In the Name of the Grandfather"), dies at age 56.

=== August ===
- August 1: Vincent Pastore, American actor (voice of Luca in Shark Tale, Terry in Aqua Teen Hunger Force, Mr. Castaneda in the Fillmore! episode "Code Name: Electric Haircut", Big Pussy in the Animals episode "Cats"), dies at age 80.
- August 2:
  - David Z, American music producer (produced "Stand Out" and "I 2 I" for A Goofy Movie), dies at age 78.
  - Carlos del Campo, Mexican voice actor (Latin American dub voice of Slinky Dog in the Toy Story series, C-3PO in the Star Wars series, Gin Ichimaru in Bleach, Watari / Quillsh Wammy in Death Note), dies at age 68.
- August 3: Jon Cypher, American actor (voice of Ira Billings / Spellbinder in Batman Beyond, Administrator in the Pinky and the Brain episode "Bah, Wilderness"), dies at age 94.
- August 5: Tedde Moore, Canadian actress (voice of Polie-Anna in Rolie Polie Olie), dies at age 79.
- August 7: H. Lee Peterson, American editor (Aladdin, Monsters University, Pocahontas, Dinosaur, Madadagascar franchise, Home on the Range, The Little Mermaid), dies at age 73.
- August 9: Reggie Bannister, American actor (voice of Guard in the Transformers: Prime episode "Deus Ex Machina"), dies at age 80.
- August 14: R. J. Kizer, American editor (The Lion King, The Return of Jafar, Megamind), dies at age 73.
- August 15:
  - Peggy Webber, American actress (voice of Elderbery in The Smurfs), dies at age 100.
  - Jan Frycz, Polish actor (Polish dub voice of Thanos in What If...?), dies at age 72.
- August 16: Hayden Panettiere, American actress (voice of Dot in A Bug's Life, Suri in Dinosaur, Ashley in the American Dad! episode "Stan's Food Restaurant", Red Puckett in Hoodwinked Too! Hood vs. Evil, Yumi in the Fillmore! episode "Code Name: Electric Haircut", Cheetara in the Robot Chicken episode "Endless Breadsticks", Fairy Princess Willow in Scooby-Doo! and the Goblin King, Kate in Alpha and Omega) and singer (performed "I Still Believe" for Cinderella III: A Twist in Time), dies at 36.
- August 17:
  - Nick Glennie-Smith, English composer (The Lion King franchise, Despicable Me franchise, Wreck It Ralph franchise, Winnie the Pooh franchise, Shark Tale, The Simpsons Movie, Legends of Oz: Dorothy's Return, Big Hero 6, The Little Prince, Smallfoot, Strange World), dies at age 74.
  - Laura Cardoso, Brazilian actress (Brazilian dub voice of Betty Rubble in The Flintstones), dies at age 98.
- August 19: Michael Wright, American actor and animator (Sausage Party), dies at age 70.
- August 22: Shelley Fabares, American actress (voice of Marta Kent in the DC Animated Universe and Superman: Brainiac Attacks), dies at age 82.
- August 24: Jeff Lowell, American screenwriter (Beethoven), dies at age 52.
- August 25:
  - Dolly Parton, American singer-songwriter, actress, philanthropist, and businesswoman (voice of Dolly Gnome in Gnomeo and Juliet, Katrina Murphy in The Magic School Bus episode "The Family Holiday Special", Noleen Hen in the Lily's Driftwood Bay episode "The Salty Chicken", herself in the Alvin and the Chipmunks episode "Urban Chipmunk" and The Simpsons episode "Sunday, Cruddy Sunday"), dies at age 80.
  - Tim Curry, English actor and singer (voice of Taurus Bulba in Darkwing Duck, Captain Hook in Peter Pan and the Pirates, Hexxus in Ferngully: The Last Rainforest, Nigel Thornberry in The Wild Thornberrys, Forte in Beauty and the Beast: The Enchanted Christmas, Ben Ravencroft in Scooby-Doo and the Witch's Ghost, Joseph Chadwick in the Ben 10 franchise, Drake in The Pebble and the Penguin, Lord Dragaunus in Mighty Ducks, Palpatine in Seasons 5 and 6 of Star Wars: The Clone Wars, Mr. Salamone in Eloise: The Animated Series, Pretorius in The Mask: Animated Series, King Acorn in Sonic the Hedgehog, Professor Finbarr Calamitous in The Adventures of Jimmy Neutron, Boy Genius, Auntie Whispers in the Over the Garden Wall episode, "The Ringing of the Bell", Dr. Mystico in the Freakazoid episode "Island of Dr. Mystico", The Sorcerer in Randy Cunningham: 9th Grade Ninja, Dr. Anton Sevarius in Gargoyles, Zimbo (and additional voices) in Aaahh!!! Real Monsters, Prince in Garfield: A Tail of Two Kitties, Muthro Botha in the Batman Beyond episode "Final Cut", English dub voice of the Cat King in The Cat Returns), dies at age 80.
- August 26: Peter Cullen, Canadian-American voice actor (voice of Optimus Prime in the Transformers franchise, Eeyore in the Winnie the Pooh franchise, Murky Dismal in Rainbow Bite, Venger in Dungeons & Dragons, Hulk, Red Skull and Mysterio in Spider-Man and His Amazing Friends, Mario in the Donkey Kong segment of Saturday Supercade, Captain Slaughter in Pound Puppies, Bankjob Beagle and Admiral Grimitz in DuckTales, Coran and Narrator in Voltron: Defender of the Universe, announcer for Toonami, original voice of Monterey Jack in Chip n' Dale Rescue Rangers), dies at age 85.

=== September ===
- September 1: Carla Jeffery, American actress (voice of Mania in the Spider-Man episode "Maximum Venom", Bree in the Zombies franchise), dies at age 33.
- September 2: Francisco Reséndez, Mexican voice actor (Latin American dub voice of Scooby-Doo in the Scooby-Doo franchise, Mario in the Donkey Kong segments of Saturday Supercade, Ambrose Bandenham in Central Park, Wonder Dog in Super Friends, Tonbee in Naruto, Makarov Dreyar in Fairy Tail, Dot Pyxis in Attack on Titan) and dub screenwriter (The Simpsons), dies at age 85.
- September 4: Ettore Zuim, Brazilian actor (Brazilian dub voice of Yakko Warner in Animaniacs, Jon Arbuckle in Garfield and Friends), dies at age 66.
- September 5: Georgina Lightning, Canadian director and actress (voice of Morning Dove in the Happily Ever After: Fairy Tales for Every Child episode "Snow White", provided additional voices for Pocahontas II: Journey to a New World and Spirit: Stallion of the Cimarron), dies at age 63.
- September 6: Joji Hirota, Japanese composer (The Lord of the Rings: The War of the Rohirrim, Animated Tales of the World), dies at age 78.
- September 9: Mike McFarland, American voice actor (English dub voice of Master Roshi in the Dragon Ball franchise, Jean Havoc in Fullmetal Alchemist, Buggy the Clown in One Piece, provided additional voices for Pokémon), director (Attack on Titan, Dragon Ball), screenwriter (Marvel Future Avengers, Fullmetal Alchemist), and producer (One Piece), dies at age 56.
- September 15: Gerrit Graham, American actor (voice of Cat R. Waul in Fievel's American Tails, Franklin Sherman in The Critic, Guardian in Gargoyles, Milo in The Tick episode "Armless But Not Harmless") and screenwriter (Oliver & Company, The Little Mermaid, The Prince and the Pauper), dies at age 76.
- September 17: Duncan Sheik, American composer (Little Spirit: Christmas in New York), dies at age 56.
- September 21: Barry Marder, American screenwriter (Bee Movie), and actor (voice of Waterbug in Bee Movie), dies at age 76.
- September 22: Loyd Price, English animator (Wallace & Gromit, Shaun the Sheep, Chicken Run, The Pirates! In an Adventure with Scientists!, Early Man, Flushed Away), dies at age 64.
- September 25: Antonio Canal, Spanish actor (Spanish dub voice of Winnie-the-Pooh in the Winnie the Pooh franchise, Kaa in The Jungle Book 2, Mayor Adam West in Family Guy), dies at age 90.
- September 26:
  - James H. Rosenfield, American executive (CBS), dies at age 97.
  - Asami Yaguchi, Japanese voice actress (voice of Kuchipatchi in the Tamagotchi franchise, Haruo in the Doraemon franchise), dies at age 47.
- September 27: Dennis Haskins, American actor (voice of Mr. Belding and Jigsaw in the Robot Chicken episode "Boo Cocky"), dies at age 75.
- September 28: Naoki Bandō, Japanese voice actor (voice of Gato in Naruto, Centichoro in One-Punch Man, Hiroshi Uzaki in Nurse Angel Ririka SOS, Otis in Mobile Suit Victory Gundam, Japanese dub voice of Muggsy Bogues in Space Jam, Doctor Sivana in Batman: The Brave and the Bold), dies at age 68.
- September 30: Scott Froschauer, American key grip (The Wacky Adventures of Ronald McDonald), dies at age 57.

=== October ===
- October 1:
  - Del Casher, American composer (KaBlam!, Robotech: Love Live Alive) and producer (Sakura Wars, Tenchi Muyo!, Love Hina), dies at age 88.
  - Frank Mancuso Sr., American executive (Paramount Pictures, Metro-Goldwyn-Mayer), dies at age 93.
- October 3: Renato Cortesi, Italian voice actor (Italian dub voice of Goofy in Who Framed Roger Rabbit, Tigger in the Winnie the Pooh franchise, Principal Skinner in The Simpsons, Lafayette in The Aristocats), dies at age 87.
- October 5: George Fenton, English composer (Valiant), dies at age 76.
- October 6: Eva Marie Saint, American actress (voice of Katara in The Legend of Korra), dies at age 102.
- October 11: Hiroshi Tsuchida, Japanese voice actor (voice of Raido Namiashi in Naruto, Friedrich von Purgstail in Guyver: The Bioboosted Armor, Shogo Muramasa in Tokko, Kazushi Yamazaki in Honey and Clover, Akamashi in Murder Princess, Yang in D.Gray-man, John Titor in Steins;Gate, Ezel in Fairy Tail, Grisha Yeager in Attack on Titan, Japanese dub voice of Malik in Space Jam: A New Legacy, Lightning McQueen in the Cars franchise, Gwi-Ma in KPop Demon Hunters, Dr. Nefario in Minions: The Rise of Gru, Donatello in Teenage Mutant Ninja Turtles), dies at age 54.
- October 12:
  - Lucian Piane, American composer (Wallykazam!), dies at age 46.
  - RJ Mitte, American actor (voice of Walter White Jr. in the Robot Chicken episode "Food"), dies at age 34.
- October 14: Michael Forest, American actor (voice of Alex Rosewater in The Big O), dies at age 97.
- October 15: Richard Riehle, American actor (voice of Sheriff Sam Brown in Home on the Range, Bumi in The Legend of Korra, Leo Grant in the Fillmore! episode "Masterstroke of Malevolence", various characters in Axe Cop), dies at age 78.
- October 16: Michael Gray, American actor (voiced himself in Archer and in the Goober and the Ghost Chasers episode "Aloha Ghost"), dies at age 75.
- October 20: Sandy Frank, American producer (Battle of the Planets), dies at age 97.
- October 21: Tom Skerritt, American actor (English dub voice of Colonel in Wings), dies at age 93.
- October 25:
  - Walter Koenig, American actor (voice of Mr. Savic in Stretch Armstrong and the Flex Fighters, Vladimir Pavel Maximov in The Real Ghostbusters episode "Russian About", himself in the Futurama episode "Where No Fan Has Gone Before"), and screenwriter, (Star Trek: The Animated Series), dies at age 90.
  - Eric Bauza, Canadian-American actor (voice of Stimpy in Ren & Stimpy "Adult Party Cartoon", Foop in The Fairly OddParents, Periwinkle “Peri” in The Fairly OddParents: A New Wish, the Beagle Boys in DuckTales, Puss in Boots in the Shrek franchise, Belly Bag in Uncle Grandpa, Dr. Psychobos, Driba, Fistrick, and various Omnitrix aliens in Ben 10: Omniverse, Master Frown in Unikitty, Fozzie Bear, Statler, Sam the Eagle, Robin the Frog, and Dr. Bunsen Honeydew in Muppet Babies, José Carioca and Scrooge McDuck in Legend of the Three Caballeros, Splinter in Rise of the Teenage Mutant Ninja Turtles, Mr. Woodbird in T.O.T.S., White Pantera in El Tigre: The Adventures of Manny Rivera, Buhdeuce in Breadwinners, Harry, Sniff, and Lloyd in Pupstruction, Mr. Negative in Spider-Man, Adam Warlock in the Guardians of the Galaxy, Amadeus Cho, Iron Spider, and Scorpion in Ultimate Spider-Man, Sentinels in X-Men '97, Principal Faust in The Owl House episode “Them’s the Breaks, Kid”, continued voice of Bugs Bunny, Daffy Duck, and various characters in the Looney Tunes franchise and Woody Woodpecker), dies at age 46.
- October 28:
  - Patrick Stewart, English actor (voice of Number One and Homer's unnamed co-worker in The Simpsons, Avery Bullock in American Dad!, Adventure in The Pagemaster, Seti I in The Prince of Egypt, King Goobot in Jimmy Neutron: Boy Genius, Mr. Woolensworth in Chicken Little, the Great Prince of the Forest in Bambi II, Max Winters in TMNT, Poop in The Emoji Movie, Major in The Plague Dogs, Jean-Luc Picard and himself in Family Guy, English dub voice of Lord Yupa in Nausicaä of the Valley of the Wind), dies at age 86.
  - Barbara Barrie, American actress (voice of Alcmene in the Hercules franchise), dies at age 95.
- October 29: Kyle Glencross, American animator (JoJo's Circus), dies at age 54.

=== November ===
- November 1: Tony Butala, American singer (voice of Lost Boy in Peter Pan), dies at age 87.
- November 4: Donnie Dunagan, American actor (voice of young Bambi in Bambi), dies at age 92.
- November 6: Dawn Greenhalgh, Canadian actress (voice of Queen Celeste in Babar, Schanhorst in Cadillacs and Dinosaurs), dies at age 93.
- November 8: Skip Hinnant, American actor (voice of Fritz the Cat in Fritz the Cat and The Nine Lives of Fritz the Cat, Sunny the Easter Bunny in The Easter Bunny Is Comin' to Town, Pogo Possum in I Go Pogo, provided additional voices for My Little Pony), dies at age 86.
- November 10:
  - Helen Fraser, English actress (provided additional voices for Minions), dies at age 84.
  - Anthony Clark, American actor (voice of Tony in the Dr. Katz, Professional Therapist episode "Family Car") and screenwriter (Dr. Katz, Professional Therapist), dies at age 62.
  - Irma P. Hall, American actress (voice of Aunt T. in the Rugrats episode "A Rugrats Kwanzaa"), dies at age 91.
  - Stacy Keach, American actor (voice of Phantasm and Carl Beaumont in Batman: Mask of the Phantasm, Howard Duff in The Simpsons, Skipper Riley in Planes and Planes: Fire & Rescue, Robert Vance in the Batman Beyond episode "Lost Soul", Marvin Finster in Rugrats, Roland De Fleures in The Zeta Project episode "The Nex Gen", Mayor and Harold Lind in What's New Scooby-Doo?, Narrator in A Turtle's Tale: Sammy's Adventures), dies at age 85.
- November 11:
  - Michael John Roberts, American director (TripTank, BoJack Horseman, Strange Planet, Clone High), animator (TripTank, BoJack Horseman, Strange Planet, Clone High), screenwriter (TripTank) and producer (TripTank), dies at age 48.
  - Laurence Crouzet, French voice actress (French dub voice of April O'Neil in Teenage Mutant Ninja Turtles, Wuya in Xiaolin Showdown, Launch in Dragon Ball, Phoebe in James Bond Jr.), dies at age 65.
- November 14: Tina Simmons, British actress (Ink and Paint Club Patron Member in Who Framed Roger Rabbit), dies at an unknown age.
- November 16: Yukio Yamagata, Japanese singer and actor (voice of Torry Aaes in Mobile Suit Victory Gundam), dies at age 69.
