= Bob's Burgers season 15 =

Bob's Burgers
- Season 15
- Promotional poster for the fifteenth season
- No. of episodes: 22

Release
- Original network: Fox
- Original release: September 29, 2024 – August 14, 2025

Season chronology
- ← Previous; Season 14 Next → Season 16

The fifteenth season of the American animated television series Bob's Burgers premiered on Fox on September 29, 2024.

== Production ==
On January 27, 2023, Bob's Burgers was renewed for a fourteenth and fifteenth broadcast season by Fox, keeping it on the air until 2025.

Jari Jones, the voice actress for Marshmallow, prepared for her musical debut in the episode "Hope n' Mic Night" by drawing on her background in musical theater. Marshmallow was previously voiced by David Herman but recast with Jones in 2020. Speaking to Deadline, Jones also reflected on her positive experiences joining the cast, and her adjustment of her portrayal of Marshmallow using her speaking voice and choosing to forgo Herman's previous portrayal with a deeper, masculine voice. Jones described the decision as wishing to discontinue the trans stereotype of a "deep-voiced girl in a dress" and stated that producers were "very open and accepting" of her perspective.

In the episode, Marshmallow sings a cover of the Alessi Brothers' single "Seabird". The rendition by Jones as well as two other songs performed in the episode—a rendition of "Hold on Loosely" by Teddy (Larry Murphy) and Mort (Andy Kindler), and the original song "Draw a Face on Your Butt" by the Belcher kids (Kristen Schaal, Eugene Mirman, and Dan Mintz) and Linda (John Roberts)—were released before the episode premiere for streaming and download on various platforms as an EP titled Bob's Burgers Open Mic Night by Fox.

== Episodes ==
No. overall	No. in season	Title	Directed by	Written by	Original release date	Prod. code	U.S. viewers (millions)
277	1	"The Tina Table: The Tables Have Tina-ed"	Bernard Derriman	Greg Thompson	September 29, 2024	DASA16	0.72
Tina's boring Wagstaff News segment is in danger of being cancelled. She agrees to feature Mr. Frond's new counseling computer game, which he designed. The game diagnoses students' personality types and becomes a sensation. However, it diagnoses wildly contrary personality types to the students, who begin working to conform to their results. As the game moves toward district-wide rollout, Tina discovers that Henry Haber hastily programmed it for Frond, who knows the game gives randomized results. She struggles on whether to reveal the truth, given how popular her show has become. She has Frond play the game live and, thanks to Henry's programming help, it negatively diagnoses him, forcing him to admit on air that the game is fake. With the rollout cancelled, students return to their lives, and Mr. Grant opts to keep Tina's show, appreciating her commitment to the truth. Meanwhile, Bob and Linda begin giving Teddy fake, elaborate spoilers for horror movies that he's too scared to see. One of Bob's imaginative summaries actually motivates Teddy to see one of the films, ultimately exposing their ruse. However, Teddy finds Bob and Linda's stories more creative than the actual films and asks for more, which they happily oblige.
278	2	"Saving Favorite Drive-In"	Brian Loschiavo	Katie Crown	October 6, 2024	DASA17	0.75
The community attends the final screening at the Cosmic Drive-In before it goes up for sale the next day. Bob is nostalgic, remembering being young and lonely and meeting and getting to know his friend Ramona there for the first time. He attempts to create a petition to save the run down theater, but attendees are less enthusiastic. He also sets up a fundraising web campaign for people to donate to, but before the screening begins, the drive-in's owner Evelyn tells him that she wants to sell because business has dwindled and she would like to do more things in her old age. She reassures Bob that the memories he has of this place won't go away, which Bob accepts. Meanwhile, Gene and Louise dip into Tina's candy stash and worry about being caught, but Tina reveals that she knew all along and just enjoyed watching them squirm. Simultaneously, Linda's inability to properly use her phone lands her in trouble when a mean comment she wrote gets sent to a fellow PTA mom on a group chat. Despite attempts to conceal it, being honest and admitting what she did ultimately clears the air between them.
279	3	"Colon-ly the Dronely"	Ryan Mattos	Lindsey Stoddart	October 20, 2024	DASA18	1.38
Teddy asks Linda to help him pick up Kathleen from her colonoscopy after he has a work accident that renders him unable to drive. Linda agrees, but they encounter several obstacles, to the point of giving up. Teddy confesses that he really wants to pick Kathleen up as an expression of his love for her, so they persevere and take Kathleen home. Meanwhile, the kids learn that recess has been cancelled so Mr. Frond can shoot a costly aerial drone video of the school for the school website. Louise hatches a plan to prank the shoot with large fart using a fog machine, while the other students want to do a dance. Seeing how important it is to them, she relents at the last minute. The video is used on the website despite their stunt. Bob uses the last of a miraculous shampoo Linda found by the dumpster, only to learn that it was the discontinued signature shampoo of a woman for whom Mort recently prepared a funeral. The woman's grieving family recognizes the unique scent while they eat at Bob's restaurant, and after figuring out what happened, they ask to smell his hair to remember her one last time.
280	4	"For Whom the Doll Toes"	Simon Chong	Loren Bouchard	October 27, 2024	DASA20	0.71
Gene is depressed after being excluded from a party thrown by other boys in his grade. After they pass by a local doll store being cared for by their substitute teacher Ms. Bisselbender, Louise invites the Belchers the next day to attend a doll murder mystery at the store that she planned and proceeds to act out with Ms. Bisselbender's assistance. It becomes clear that the murder mystery is lifted from Gene's exclusion by the other boys, but Gene plays along at Louise's insistence. The murderer is revealed to be the "Gene" doll's younger sister, and Louise finally admits that she overheard the circumstances that lead Gene to be excluded: The boys made fun of Ms. Bisselbender's camel toe, but Gene immediately defended her, causing the boys to secretly opt not to invite him to their party. Louise overheard their plan, but failed to come to Gene's defense, and has since wrestled with both her admiration of Gene's openness at speaking up, and her disappointment in her own silence and inaction. The family reassures Louise that she can talk to any of them when she needs to process difficult feelings like these, and Gene is cheered up.
281	5	"Don't Stop Be-cheesin'"	Chris Song	Dan Fybel	November 3, 2024	DASA19	1.05
It's the annual Cheese Royale, a multi-day tradition where 8th graders form teams and hold a battle royale where they throw slices of cheese at one another off school grounds until one team emerges victorious. Tina is unenthused, but elects to join Jimmy Jr.'s team. During practice, the entire team except Tina are hit by a mysterious competitor referred to as the "Big Cheese". Tina practices, becoming one of a handful of remaining teens. They are all summoned to a warehouse by fellow competitor Henry in a bid to suss out the Big Cheese's identity, but the remaining teens attack one another until only Tina and Sam are left. Sam reveals that he is the Big Cheese, but Tina tricks and defeats him, winning the Cheese Royale. Meanwhile, the other Belchers and Teddy teach Linda how to be a more effective eavesdropper so they can hear juicy gossip from their patrons. Linda takes a risk with her new skills, but manages to get all the details of a lover's quarrel, earning the others' respect.
282	6	"Hope N' Mic Night"	Simon Chong	Loren Bouchard	November 10, 2024	DASA22	0.71
Wagstaff cancels its talent show, and the kids plan an open mic night at the restaurant instead. Bob worries about the stacking expenses for equipment and licensing, but hopes the strong community interest, including from Mr. Fishoeder and Marshmallow, will mean enough sales to help them make some profit. The night of the event, the fire marshal threatens to shut the event down for being over capacity, but Marshmallow calls in a life debt he owes her after she saved him from a dance club fire, and he relents. Teddy and Mort perform a bossa nova rendition of "Hold On Loosely"; Mr. Fishoeder performs "Opposites Attract" with his guest, a Belgian princess; Marshmallow sings "Seabird" for her supportive parents; and the Belcher kids perform an original song, "Draw a Face on Your Butt", inspired by Tina's diary entries about Jimmy Jr.. The kids start a collection hat for the crowd to donate to cover the restaurant's costs and their performance delights Jimmy Jr., to Tina's relief. He dances along and the kids invite Linda to sing onstage with them to a cheering crowd. Three songs from the episode: "Hold on Loosely", "Seabird", and "Draw a Face on Your Butt" were released before the episode premiered as an EP for streaming and download.
283	7	"Boogie Days"	Brian Loschiavo	Jon Schroeder	November 24, 2024	EASA01	1.32
Louise talks Bob into participating in a father-daughter boogie boarding contest, despite Bob's fear of the ocean. At the contest, Bob reveals his fear is due to getting injured and almost drowning while boogie boarding when he was younger, which unnerves her. During the contest, Louise gets injured like Bob did and calls it quits. While walking back home, Bob regains his confidence and convinces Louise to try again. They reenter the contest, where they come in 4th place. Meanwhile, Linda plans a birthday party for Teddy, which Teddy cancels at the last minute due to a friend's death. After the funeral, Teddy and his handyman friends dine at Bob's Burgers, and Linda misreads the room and throws Teddy's birthday party anyway, and it doesn't go well. Linda saves the party by making a game of fixing the broken ice cream machine with the handymen.
284	8	"They Slug Horses, Don't They?"	Bernard Derriman	Nora Smith	December 8, 2024	DASA21	1.03
Tina and Louise clash after Louise carelessly, but accidentally, breaks Tina's new Equestranauts figurine. When Louise refuses to apologize, Tina calls her a brat. Linda has Louise write an apology to Tina, but instead, she draws a comic depicting Tina being launched into space. Incensed, Tina draws one showing Louise being launched into space instead and steals her Slug Army Knife doll. Worried that they cannot leave the two alone when she and Bob go out, Linda asks Gayle to babysit. Gayle attempts to help them make peace, but their conflict only grows. Finally, Gayle locates a piece of artwork Linda saved from their youth, where a young Gayle defaced one of Linda's collages of teen heartthrobs after Linda called her creepy, changing it to a portrait of them as sisters. Though Linda was initially upset, she kept it all these years out of sisterly affection. Gayle explains to the girls that being sisters can be challenging, feeling both love for and conflict with each other. She implores them not to drift apart. The girls reconcile, with Louise redrawing the comic so that the two maneuver their rockets together, while Tina connects their figurines so they can play together.
285	9	"Dog Christmas Day After Afternoon"	Chris Song	Steven Davis	December 15, 2024	EASA02	1.16
The Belcher children are disappointed when Christmas arrives but they don't get the expensive Game Whiz system they asked Bob and Linda for. Feeling guilty, Linda and Bob take the kids out to a wealthy neighborhood to look at the Christmas lights. While walking, Gene finds a lost puppy and feeds it his bar of dark chocolate before it runs away, not knowing that dark chocolate is poisonous to dogs. When he tells his family what he did, they all frantically search for the puppy to try to save it. They locate it and ask a nearby resident to help them induce the puppy to vomit out the chocolate with some hydrogen peroxide. The kids grow attached to the puppy, but its owner arrives looking for it, and learning that it was a gift for the owner's toddler, they make the difficult decision to give it back, now even more disappointed than before. However, the grateful owner gives Bob and Linda a large sum of cash as a thank you for saving his Christmas. Bob and Linda use it to buy the kids the Game Whiz, and Linda affirms that this was the Christmas magic of the universe aligning in their favor.
286	10	"Advice Things Are Ad-Nice"	Ryan Mattos	Holly Schlesinger	December 29, 2024	EASA03	1.20
Tina is assigned to write the school's anonymous student advice column "Ask an 8th Grader". When no one writes in, Louise and Linda secretly submit letters under the pseudonym "Miss Am-I-Normal" using content from Tina's diary. Tina's advice and Miss Am-I-Normal's issues resonate with the students, who identify with Miss Am-I-Normal, and elect her school ambassador for the upcoming city parade. Louise and Linda admit their ruse to Tina, but before she can tell anyone, Tammy claims to be Miss-Am-I-Normal, gaining the ambassadorship. Tina confronts her, but Tammy warns her that the students identify too strongly with Miss Am-I-Normal to take the truth well. At the parade, Tammy gives a judgmental speech contradicting Miss Am-I-Normal's positive message, which causes disillusionment in the students. Tina tries to help by admitting the truth, and Louise and Linda publicly announce that they are Miss Am-I-Normal. However, the students misinterpret it, and rally around collectively identifying as Miss Am-I-Normal and what she stood for. Louise suggests that Tina accept the good advice she gave herself. Meanwhile, Teddy struggles to build a parade float for a local club when he over-promises on its functionalities to impress them.
287	11	"Mr. Fischoeder's Opus"	Brian Loschiavo	Scott Jacobson	May 18, 2025	EASA04	0.52
Mr. Fischoeder recruits The Belchers to cater for a party he is throwing for the symphony's musicians as he anticipates his conducting debut. He hopes to convince the musicians to play the first movement of the piece at a faster tempo, a controversial opinion among admirers of the piece, and one strongly opposed by the concert master, Jackson. At the party, Jackson expresses distaste for Bob's signature burger using peaches, and Bob accidentally lets slip Fischoeder's intentions with the piece's tempo. Jackson rallies the other musicians to unanimously and vocally reject Fischoeder's proposed tempo change. Dismayed, Fischoeder leaves the party. Bob tries to cheer him up, suggesting that he play the piece conventionally. On the night of the performance, Bob discusses the advice he gave Fischoeder with Linda, saying that conventional is best, illustrated by how Jackson disliked his burger. However, Linda informs him that everyone else at the party raved about his burgers, and Bob realizes that Jackson may be wrong. He finds Fischoeder and convinces him to conduct his way. Fischoeder conducts the piece the way he wanted to. The audience and the musicians are enthused with the change, and Jackson must begrudgingly play along.
288	12	"Like a Candle in the Gym"	Chris Song	Lindsey Stoddart	May 29, 2025	EASA05	0.64
The Belchers go on a family walk to the pier. The Belcher kids run into their conspiracy-prone schoolmate Megan spying on Coach Blevins, whom she suspects of being part of a sinister conspiracy based on a rumor the Belcher kids made up in school in retaliation against Blevins. Fearing that Megan stalking Blevins and recording him could get her suspended and cause trouble for Blevins, they run after her, abandoning Bob and Linda, and Louise tries to reason with her. Ultimately, Megan listens to Louise's plea to truly value questioning things by also remembering to question herself and decides to abandon her plan. Meanwhile, during the walk, Linda soon gets severe blisters on her ankles from her ill-fitting shoes, and Bob improvises by wheeling her around in an abandoned shopping cart. Finally meeting up with them, the kids say they actually had fun, and the Belchers agree to do more family walks in the future.
289	13	"Snackface"	Ryan Mattos	Rich Rinaldi	June 5, 2025	EASA06	0.53
Tina, Gene and Louise begin making money by selling extreme-tasting homemade snacks at recess, risking detention, as selling snacks is banned by Mr.Frond. Millie joins their activities when she helps them stop a rival snack seller, but slowly edges Gene and Tina out after proposing a major sale. However, Tina and Gene learn the rival seller was a ruse created by Millie, and that the major sale is a trap so that she and Louise will get caught and be forced to spend detention together for the rest of the year. They warn Louise, managing to foil Millie's plan. Louise apologizes to her siblings, acknowledging them as her true team. Meanwhile, Bob and Linda's old laptop hard drive crashes in the middle of their strenuous tax record-keeping, putting all their unbacked-up data at risk. The computer repairman informs them that the chances of salvaging the data are slim, and they are forced to choose between rescuing their tax data or their family photos before the hard drive fails completely. At the last minute, Bob chooses the photos, which manage to back up to the new hard drive successfully, though the tax records are lost.
290	14	"The Place Beyond the Pinecones"	Brian Loschiavo	Katie Crown	June 12, 2025	EASA07	0.80
Tina attends an overnight retreat with the Thunder Girls, where the troops must find a golden spray-painted pine cone. Suspecting that Troop 257 will cheat, Tina's troop assigns her to follow them in the woods. Tina inadvertently finds the golden pine cone while trailing Troop 257. She hides it in her uniform before she is ambushed by Rena and Patty of Troop 257, who knew she was following them. The three get lost in the woods, and as night falls, they stumble upon a creepy finishing school for young girls, run by a strict headmistress. Their antics displease the headmistress, who separates the girls, keeping them guarded in a room, but Tina manages to escape. Disliking Rena and Patty, but recognizing that they are also Thunder Girls like her, she goes back to free them. She burns the golden pine cone as a distraction and the three girls escape and find their way back to their troops. With no pine cone, the troop leaders instead have the troops celebrate their camaraderie.
291	15	"The Lost City of Atlantic"	Chris Song	Dan Fybel	June 19, 2025	EASA08	0.71
The Belchers go to the casino to cash in old chips Linda received from her paternal grandfather Max during her childhood. The older casino staff fondly remember their colleague Max, but Linda discovers Max had an affair with waitress Shirley, and an illegitimate daughter, Sharon, who now works as the mermaid performer in the casino's giant fish tank. Devastated by her grandfather's infidelity, Linda angrily confronts Shirley, who reveals that the staff are also orchestrating a heist today to steal money that was promised to them by the original owner before the new owners reneged on the agreement. Linda inadvertently reveals this to Sharon while introducing herself as her relative. When the plan to sneak the money out is compromised, Shirley plans to swim the money out using the mermaid costume and the underwater tunnel to the outside fountain, but Sharon and Linda, both opposed to the heist, know Shirley is too old to make it. In the midst of the argument, Shirley reveals that Max told Linda's grandmother about the affair and she forgave him. Sharon, wanting to protect Shirley, reluctantly swims the money out. Linda, recognizing that life is complicated, makes peace with her grandfather's actions and her new relatives. Elsewhere at the casino, Bob is in sheer bliss at not only enjoying several free slabs of prime rib but being allowed to slice the roast before he leaves, and the kids are happy to get free candy (until they realize they hate the flavors they picked) but also determined to use a stray slot machine token after being prohibited from doing so by security.
292	16	"The Shell Game"	Chris Song	Greg Thompson	July 3, 2025	EASA11	0.58
Mr. Fischoeder invites the family to a 100th birthday party for his tortoise Ulysses. At the party he announces a contest among the guests to determine who will be Ulysses' future caretaker upon Fischoeder's death, including a yearly $10,000 stipend The Belcher kids, excited at the idea of a pet tortoise and the money secretly stuff Bob's pocket with dandelion greens to attract the tortoise, winning the contest. Bob, prone to not being favored by animals, gets excited at being picked by Ulysses. Inga, Mr. Fischoeder's housekeeper, and Ulysses' chief caretaker, feels dejected and decides to quit and return to Sweden. Realizing Inga is attached to the tortoise, the kids admit to cheating. Bob reluctantly convinces Fischoeder to get Inga to come back, and he agrees to let her remain Ulysses' caretaker.
293	17	"Wild Steal-ions"	Ian Hamilton	Brian Wylie	July 10, 2025	EASA10	0.68
Tina's erotic horse-fiction journal goes missing afterschool, after which she begins receiving ransom calls demanding money for its return. Gene and Louise's attempt to intervene results in the culprit damaging the book and demanding more money, infuriating Tina. Louise and Gene, wanting to make things right, begin to interrogate suspects, including Logan, who directs them to his friend Troy. They eventually discover Troy's high-school freshman sister Regan is the culprit, and all three Belchers confront her. Regan claims it's to protect Tina from judgement in high school as she was for drawing comics about frogs. She tries to throw the book into a backyard pizza oven, but Louise rescues the book from a fiery destruction. Tina brushes off Regan's insecurities as she embraces her passions and continues writing in the book.
294	18	"Don't Worry, Be Hoopy"	Ryan Mattos	Lindsey Stoddart	July 17, 2025	EASA15	0.60
After winning a school-wide basketball free throw competition in gym class (by 'granny-throwing'), Tina is placed in the district-wide competition. When she goes missing before her turn, Bob and Linda both begin to worry that their individual pep talks from the night before may have caused her to back out, and go looking for her. Tina is revealed to be suffering from anxiety over competing in front of a crowd, stemming from the stage fright she suffered before a ballet recital at age 6. While hiding in a closet, she is confronted by her six year old self who tries to convince Tina to bail on the competition. Tina finally realizes that she is causing herself more stress trying to throw the contest than actually playing, and returns to the gym in time to compete.
295	19	"The Dead Bo-ats Society"	Ryan Mattos	Jameel Saleem	July 31, 2025	EASA12	0.62
Wanting to keep their Saturday morning adventures, the kids promise their parents to be home on time to work. Louise convinces the other two to explore a marine scrap yard, unaware the owner has left his guard dog behind while he runs errands. The dog traps the kids in one of the abandoned yachts. They manage to reach to a rusty tugboat using a ladder to climb overhead, but become trapped when the ship rolls over and leaves them up against a fence. Things become even more dangerous when the dog manages to get inside the ship, and chases the kids into a kitchen cupboard, from where they find a tiny gap in the ship's hull. Tina narrowly evades the guard dog when she briefly escapes the cupboard to grab a crowbar to open the gap. The kids manage to escape the scrapyard and get home with seconds to spare. Meanwhile, Bob and Linda discover Teddy is caring for a butterfly growing kit he accidentally received, and have to convince him to release the butterflies once they have left their chrysalises.
296	20	"Dad-urday Kite Fever"	Brian Loschiavo	Scott Jacobson	July 31, 2025	EASA13	0.51
Big Bob gives Bob the childhood kite he gave him after his mother died that they never used, hoping to take his grandchildren out to fly it. Guilty at the idea he might be missing out on a crucial bonding experience, Bob agrees to go with. Following several small mishaps while retrieving the windswept kite, Bob ends up on a train to Bog Harbor. He runs into Critter, who buys his train ticket. On the train Critter spots a rival motorcycle gang member, Dusty, who sabotaged his son Sidecar's preschool admission, and uses Bob's kite to cut Dusty's mullet. In revenge Dusty takes the kite. Just as Bob convinces Dusty to return the kite to him and make up with Critter, the wind blows the kite into the ocean. Bob tries to swim out to get it, but Critter and Dusty convince him his presence and attention to his kids is more crucial than a kite, he abandons it. He returns to the park to spend time with his father and children, who have passed the time burning trash in a grill with Big Bob's lighter. Meanwhile, Linda helps Teddy practice his one line in a play, but hits a roadblock when he can't say the last word 'lawnmower' correctly (instead saying 'mowlawner'). The problem is resolved when Teddy finds out he can say the word while impersonating Linda.
297	21	"Mr. Safebody"	Chris Song	Steven Davis	August 7, 2025	EASA14	0.68
Arnold approaches Louise to help him promote his bodyguarding services with an ad. Despite her skepticism regarding Arnold's dimunitive size, she reluctantly agrees, enlisting her siblings and Rudy to help. They decide to film in the hallways at an abandoned high school, only to come across a duo of bullies. Arnold flees in fear from the bullies when they challenge a fight, leaving the group to flee through the hallways. They become trapped in a gymnasium flooded by sewage by the bullies, and Arnold realizes he doesn't need to be physically intimidating to defend himself. Using wit, Arnold manages to trick the bullies, trapping one of them out on a platform in the middle of the sewage flood, and helping his friends escape. Louise commends Arnold's skills, even though he ultimately decides to scrap the bodyguarding business. Meanwhile, a stolen car is parked outside of the restaurant during a getaway, with the radio turned on full blast to 90s alternative rock, much to Linda and Teddy's delight and Bob's irritation. Police refuse to turn the music off until forensics arrive as the car is determined part of a crime scene, frustrating Bob. However, just as the forensic officer arrives, the station plays a song Bob greatly enjoys. When the officer turns off the radio in the middle of the song, Bob begs him to turn it back on, and he does, delighting Bob.
298	22	"Insomnibob"	Ryan Mattos	Jon Schroeder	August 14, 2025	EASA09	0.79
After reading Skip Marooch's latest autobiography and feeling unfulfilled with his craft and Burgers of the Day, Bob struggles to sleep. He decides to spend time experimenting in the kitchen in the middle of the night on what he hopes to be "Burger of the Year". The lack of sleep over the next several days causes him to hallucinate Skip on the book cover talking to him, as well as a fantasy inspired by Maurice Sendak's In the Night Kitchen. Frustrated at Bob's gradual loss of touch with reality and worried about his health, Linda tries to get him to take sleep aids. Eventually, Bob's hallucination of Skip convinces him that they have both achieved success in their own ways, and Bob doesn't need to worry about matching Skip's accomplishments. Reinvigorated by his gratitude for his family, Bob finally takes the sleep aids to catch up on rest. Meanwhile, the Belcher siblings make a game out of throwing mushy old pickle slices on the side of the house by the dumpster, soon working together to create a portrait of their father. Bob witnesses the pickle mural during his sleep deprivation, further causing hallucinations. When Bob is fully rested, he becomes confused as to what he saw, as the pickles were then washed away by the rain.
