= 400?! =

- American Dad! episode
- Episode no.: Season 22; Episode 12
- Directed by: John O'Day
- Written by: Zack Rosenblatt
- Production code: KAJN12
- Original air date: September 13, 2026

Episode chronology
← Previous "A Donkey's Shame"	Next → "Tales from the Outer Frontier"
- American Dad! season 22

"400?!" is the twelfth and penultimate episode of the twenty-second season of American Dad!, and the 400th episode overall. The episode features Stan nearly dying on his 400th CIA mission and coming back home to find he’s been cloned several times over.

== Plot ==
During a dangerous mission, Stan is grievously injured and presumed dead. Although he survives and returns home, he discovers a clone of himself in his house. After subduing the clone and taking it to the CIA, Stan learns from Bullock that the CIA has numerous clones of him, ostensibly to replace him should he die. Exasperated by the numerous responsibilities he has to his family, Bullock lets Stan use the clones to take over some of his workload. The family discovers the clones and, Francine, realizing that Stan has not actually taken up any responsibilities himself, kicks him out of the house.

Stan returns home to seek forgiveness, but the clones block him, realizing they are superior to Stan. Stan returns to the CIA headquarters, where Bullock reveals that he gave Stan the clones so that the clones could realize their superiority and supplant humanity. However, this version of Bullock is revealed to be a clone himself, and is tackled by the real Bullock, who escapes with Stan. The Bullock clone traps them in an incinerator, which actually ships them to an island full of defective Stan clones. The defective clones form a boat which Stan uses to sail back to Langley. Stan leads the defective clones to battle against the superior clones, and defeats all of them, with the remaining superior clones being accidentally run over by Klaus and the defective clones returning to the island, as they will be killed on sight otherwise.

== Production ==
Stan's 400th mission follows the tradition of theming episodes to their numbers. The episode marks the last voice performance of Patrick Stewart as Deputy Director Avery Bullock, before the actor's death on October 28, 2026.

== Critical reception ==
CinemaBlend praised the episode's references to Family Guy, The Simpsons, Futurama, and other characters saying "Nobody pulls off a clone episode quite like American Dad". John Schwarz of BubbleBlabber had high praise for the episode, stating it "should be required watching for casual and hardcore fans alike". Marisa Roffman of Give Me My Remote said the episode was "solid" but that it felt like "Fox burned off these episodes", referring to the release of the season finale "Tales from the Outer Frontier" on the same day.
