= American Dad! season 22 =

American Dad!
- Season 22
- Promotional poster for the 22nd season featuring the Smith family
- Starring: Seth MacFarlane; Wendy Schaal; Scott Grimes; Rachael MacFarlane; Dee Bradley Baker; Jeff Fischer
- No. of episodes: 13

Release
- Original network: Fox
- Original release: February 22 – September 13, 2026

Season chronology
- ← Previous; Season 21

American Dad!'s twenty-second season premiered on Fox on February 22, 2026, marking the show's return to the network following its cancellation by TBS in March 2025. The season features guest appearances from Ming-Na Wen, RuPaul, Chris Pine, Bradley Whitford, Patrick Stump, Jonathan Frakes, Joe Mantegna, Wayne Newton, Kyle MacLachlan, Mary Steenburgen and Ted Danson. The season concluded on September 13, 2026.

The series focuses on the eccentric upper middle class Smith family, consisting of father, husband, CIA agent, and Republican, Stan; his wife and housewife, Francine; their liberal, hippie, college-aged daughter, Hayley-Fischer; their dorky high-school-aged son, Steve; the family's unusual goldfish, Klaus; flamboyant, master of disguise alien, Roger; Jeff Fischer, Hayley Smith's stoner husband who resides with the Smith family; and Roger's ex-tumor son Rogu, who reside in a fictionalized version of Langley, Virginia.

This season contains "400?!", the 400th episode of the series which is also the last episode to feature Patrick Stewart as Avery Bullock before he passed away on October 28, 2026.

== Voice cast and characters ==
=== Regular ===
- Seth MacFarlane as Stan Smith, Roger Smith, Greg Corbin
- Wendy Schaal as Francine Smith
- Scott Grimes as Steve Smith
- Rachael MacFarlane as Hayley Smith
- Dee Bradley Baker as Klaus Heisler, Rogu
- Jeff Fischer as Jeff Fischer

=== Supporting characters ===
- Patrick Stewart as Avery Bullock
- Kevin Michael Richardson as Principal Brian Lewis
- Curtis Armstrong as Schmuley "Snot" Lonstein
- Daisuke Suzuki as Toshi Yoshida
- Eddie Kaye Thomas as Barry Robinson
- Rachel Dratch as Nerfer
- Nicole Shabtai as Danuta Tenuta
- Alan Tudyk as Dr. Kalgary
- Nicole Shabtai as Esther Lonstein
- Richard Kind as Al Tuttle

== Episodes ==
No. overall	No. in season	Title	Directed by	Written by	Original release date	Prod. code	U.S. viewers (millions)
389	1	"Aw Rats, A Pool Party"	Chris Bennett	Matt Weitzman	February 22, 2026	KAJN01	0.79
Francine wants to use the backyard pool to reconnect with Gwen, while Stan throws a work pool party to impress Bullock, and Steve invites his old flame Debbie over to try and win her back. However, things get complicated when a dead rat is found in the water. Meanwhile, Roger misses the pool party while trying to find the mustache for his Uncle Roger persona.: Note: This was the first episode to use the new revamped opening sequence.
390	2	"The Flume Flume Room"	Josue Cervantes	Brett Cawley & Robert Maitia	March 1, 2026	KAJN02	0.67
Francine develops a new obsession with log flume rides, which Stan struggles to understand.
391	3	"Powering Through"	Shawn Murray	Jeff Kauffmann	March 8, 2026	KAJN03	0.71
Stan sets out to prove he can power through any illness known to man without medical assistance.
392	4	"Camera Stan"	John O'Day	Parker Deay	March 15, 2026	KAJN04	0.57
Stan is convinced he can thrive on reality TV. Meanwhile, Klaus transplants a barista's brain into a snail to make a Klaus of his own.
393	5	"Idol Threat"	Jansen Yee	Soren Bowie	April 12, 2026	KAJN05	0.60
Steve is annoyed after his life is saved by the school bully, who then becomes celebrated as a local hero.
394	6	"The Treasure of Old Chinatown"	Joe Daniello	Nic Wegener	April 26, 2026	KAJN06	0.72
Francine reluctantly joins Steve and Bah Bah on the hunt for an ancient Chinese artifact. Meanwhile, Roger becomes a food influencer.
395	7	"Reaper Madness"	Jennifer Graves	Alisha Ketry	May 3, 2026	KAJN07	0.55
Hayley and Klaus become addicted to horror stories after one gives them an immense high.
396	8	"Dude, You're Getting a Del!"	Tim Parsons	Joel Hurwitz	May 10, 2026	KAJN08	0.54
Klaus becomes a father figure to Snot in order to impress his mother. Meanwhile, Hayley and Jeff open a cat café.
397	9	"Where the Wild Boars Are"	Chris Bennett	Kevin Tyler	May 17, 2026	KAJN09	0.72
Jeff receives an important lesson. Roger becomes a shed gardener.
398	10	"Dumbston Checks In"	Josue Cervantes	Curtis Cook	June 21, 2026	KAJN10	0.61
Steve and Principal Lewis want to save the school. Stan searches for a decent meal.
399	11	"A Donkey's Shame"	Shawn Murray	Nicole Shabtai	June 21, 2026	KAJN11	0.55
Stan and Francine confront John Mayer at Las Vegas.
400	12	"400?!"	John O'Day	Zack Rosenblatt	September 13, 2026	KAJN12	1.01
Stan nearly dies on his 400th mission and returns home to realize the CIA’s secret clone program has already replaced him.
401	13	"Tales from the Outer Frontier"	Jansen Yee	Sam Brenner	September 13, 2026	KAJN13	0.74
In this three-part anthology of self-contained tales, the Smiths take on new roles across the harsh frontier of space, confronting mortality, purpose, and that relentless Mars dust.

== Production ==
=== Development ===
On March 21, 2025, TBS announced that they would not order any additional episodes of the series. It was later reported later that day that the show's original network, Fox, was in contract negotiations with the show's producer, 20th Television Animation, for a multiple season renewal. On April 2, 2025, Fox renewed American Dad for a further four seasons.

=== Casting ===
Francine's adoptive sister Gwen Ling, who was voiced by Uma Thurman in the season twelve episode "Now and Gwen", is now voiced by Ming-Na Wen.

=== Opening sequence ===
Starting with this season, a new opening sequence would debut. This time, Jeff appears in the living room, Memphis Stormfront replaces Terry Bates, due to Mike Barker's departure from the series in 2013. Additionally, Rogu also appears, and Stan drives a Ford Expedition instead of a Ford Explorer.

== Release ==
The season premiered on February 22, 2026, as part of Fox's Animation Domination block, where it airs alongside Bob's Burgers, Universal Basic Guys and Family Guy during the 2025–26 television season. The 400th episode premiered on September 13, 2026.
