= Joaquim Casado =

Spanish actor (died 2026)

- Born: Joaquim Casado Gras
- Died: 22 June 2026
- Occupation: Voice actor

Joaquim Casado Gras (died 22 June 2026) was a Spanish voice actor. He was best known for providing the dubbed voice of Nobisuke Nobi, the father of Nobita Nobi, in the Catalan version of the Japanese anime television series Doraemon.

In addition to his work in Doraemon, he provided the dubbed Catalan versions of Michael Bell, Buster Jones, Jack Angel, Regis Cordic, G. Stanley Jones, Neil Ross, Corey Burton and Peter Cullen in The Transformers: The Movie, Frank Collison in Hitchcock and Fred Dryer in Bumblebee, and voiced the Catalan versions of Isaac Netero in Hunter × Hunter, Cap Gyaosu, Déu, Yo Chen, Pollastre Fregit and Parsan in Dr. Slump, Matsukata in Assassination Classroom, Ebizo in Naruto Shippuden, Astram Schiller in Inazuma Eleven, Gennosuke Yumi in Mazinger Z: Infinity, Hiruzen Sarutobi in Naruto, Naguri in One Piece and Venerable Ancià in Dragon Ball Z Kai.

Casado died on 22 June 2026.
