= Bob's Burgers season 16 =

Bob's Burgers
- Season 16
- Promotional poster for the sixteenth season featuring the Belcher family
- No. of episodes: 15

Release
- Original network: Fox
- Original release: September 28, 2025 – May 17, 2026

Season chronology
- ← Previous; Season 15 Next → Season 17

The sixteenth season of the American animated series Bob's Burgers aired on Fox from September 28, 2025 to May 17, 2026.

== Production ==
On April 2, 2025, Bob's Burgers was renewed for a further four seasons taking the number of seasons up to nineteen. This season also included the airing of the show's 300th episode.

== Episodes ==
| No. overall | No. in season | Title | Directed by | Written by | Original release date | Prod. code | U.S. viewers (millions) |
|---|---|---|---|---|---|---|---|
| 299 | 1 | "Grand Pre-Pre-Pre-Opening" | Chris Song | Loren Bouchard & Nora Smith | September 28, 2025 | EASA17 | 0.63 |
Bob is panicking over a plan to increase his burger prices by $1 apiece, which leads to him reflecting on the restaurant's origins, as the kids compose an elaborate and insulting musical "tribute" to their parents and the restaurant: A younger newlywed Bob was a short order cook, and Linda was a secretary for an insurance company. Linda finds the Wonder Wharf location and gets Mr. Fischoeder's OK to have the space once they come up with a down payment, which Linda sources from the condo fund she'd been saving for since she was a teenager. She signs the location's lease for Bob, encouraging him to pursue his dreams while simultaneously revealing she is pregnant with Tina. The Belchers move in and renovate, meeting handyman Teddy and a toupee-wearing Mort. During the restaurant's grand opening, a panicked Bob stress vomits, while Linda goes into labor, forcing them to close early with no official sales. When Tina is born, Bob suddenly feels less afraid of the future, recognizing that he must be strong for Tina, and he re-does the grand opening shortly after they bring Tina home. Back in the present, Bob ups his regular burger price to $6.00 and the special to $6.95, and prepares for the lunch shift.
| 300 | 2 | "'Til Death Do Us Art" | Brian Loschiavo | Katie Crown | October 5, 2025 | EASA16 | 0.90 |
Gayle becomes determined to marry after observing Bob and Linda's marital life. She chooses two former flames from her upcoming artists' showcase to marry, having the Belchers and Teddy rate them in secret during trial dates at the restaurant. Linda objects, telling Gayle that she doesn't need to marry two weirdos she doesn't really like to be happy. Gayle, offended by Linda's lack of support, bans Linda from her show, where she will marry one of the two as part of a performance piece, but also intends to formally marry the chosen man. Linda is blocked by the security guard, per Gayle's request, but sneaks onto the roof and yells for Gayle not to go through with it. Gayle sees Linda wearing a necklace she made, and realizes that the person she needs to be happy is herself and her art, and opts to marry herself, with Linda as her bridesmaid.
| 301 | 3 | "The Twinnening" | Ryan Mattos | Kelvin Yu | October 19, 2025 | EASA18 | 1.17 |
Gabriel, the creepy antique store owner next door hires Teddy to install a cabinet for an expensive ritual mask. Gabriel must leave, but warns him not to open the store door for anyone, not even his nefarious twin brother, Gideon. Soon after, "Gabriel" reappears asking to be let in, but cannot remember any of the details of his conversation with Teddy. Unnerved, Teddy refuses to open the door. The double manages to sneak into the store, demanding the mask. Gabriel returns, revealing the double to be Gideon, who is also an antique dealer. They both have a buyer for the mask, but when the twins muse about the buyer using the mask for dark purposes, Teddy flees and throws the mask into the harbor. The twins opt to split the insurance on the loss, while Gus later finds it washed up on the beach. Meanwhile, Bob and Linda fail to get standby tickets to the latest Cake show. Outside, they encounter an original member of Cake, who has become disenchanted with the show's success at the cost of its integrity. Bob convinces him to keep at it, in the hopes of inspiring others like it did for him.
| 302 | 4 | "The Skids in the Hall" | Brian Loschiavo | Rich Rinaldi | October 26, 2025 | EASA19 | 0.67 |
Mr. Frond fires Tina from hall monitor duty at school after she briefly leaves her post to fix a water fountain left unattended by another monitor, Stuart, while a student, Cole, supposedly twists his ankle after running and falling. Louise notices the water fountain had been clogged deliberately, then sees Cole dancing on the allegedly injured leg. She suspects that Tina has been set up. The Belcher kids find out that seventh-grade boys are competing in illegal sock slide-racing in the halls. Stuart and head hall monitor Maggie are being bribed with candy to allow it. With Rudy's help, they manage to record evidence of the races along with Maggie confessing about the bribery. They use it as blackmail to get Tina reinstated and promoted to head hall monitor. Meanwhile, Bob is excited to re-take his driver's license photo as his current one is embarrassing. He reluctantly allows Gretchen to trim and style his mustache to model for her salon, which is a disaster. Gretchen's attempt to fix it makes it worse. Bob is forced to shave it off and wears a fake mustache to the appointment, which begins to fall off as the new photo is taken.
| 303 | 5 | "The Secret Guardin'" | Chris Song | Dan Fybel | November 2, 2025 | EASA20 | 0.77 |
The Belcher kids try to replace Linda's shattered porcelain baby that happened while Tina was babysitting. They order a new one, but Louise has dental surgery and is loopy from the anesthesia. Worried that Louise will blab about what happened, Tina and Gene hover around her while trying to distract Linda. Finding them unhelpful, Linda tells them to leave. The replacement arrives. Tina has Louise distract Linda during the swap by telling her to tell the truth, banking that Linda will think Louise's story is a hallucination. The swap succeeds. While Tina and Gene celebrate their successful gambit, Linda and Bob secretly celebrate that Louise didn't blab about them allowing her to stay up late to watch a horror movie without Tina and Gene. Meanwhile, Teddy is nervous about picking up Kathleen's very stringent Catholic mother at the airport during her visit. While trying to gain her approval at the restaurant by pretending to be Catholic, he too late realizes that he picked up another Irish Catholic woman whose daughter's name also happens to be Kathleen. He rushes to pick up the correct woman while arranging for the other Kathleen, a bodybuilder, to pick up her mother at the restaurant. The wrong Irish mom hates Bob on sight for no clear reason and he later reports that she tried, without success, to get her extremely buff but kind-hearted Kathleen to severely beat him up.
| 304 | 6 | "Get Her to the Zeke" | Ryan Mattos | Lizzie Molyneux-Logelin & Wendy Molyneux | November 9, 2025 | EASA21 | 1.19 |
Jimmy Jr. refuses to go to the 8th grade dance with Tina, because he's worried that Zeke won't have a date. Tina tries to set Zeke up with new student Penelope and they go on a trial double date. However, she and Jimmy Jr. discover that Penelope is weird and controlling, and treats Zeke badly. Penelope also smarmily tells an increasingly angry Tina that she thinks Jimmy Jr. should take her cousin to the dance and abandon Tina. They try to privately urge Zeke not to go with her to the dance, but Zeke expresses frustration that no one is ever interested in him for things like dancing or dating and that at least Penelope is/appears to be. Realizing that Zeke is a soft-hearted romantic, Tina and Jimmy Jr. jointly invite him to be their dance date together, telling him that he deserves to be with people who like the real Zeke. They leave a bitter Penelope at the restaurant and Zeke excitedly makes plans to coordinate their outfits and a dance routine for all three of them. Meanwhile, Hugo brings along a rat catcher, seeking a large "super rat" near the restaurant. When Bob accidentally lets it in, the Belchers feel sympathy for it and secretly capture it and let it go free without Hugo or the rat catcher knowing.
| 305 | 7 | "Tube for Tina" | Brian Loschiavo | Nora Smith & Holly Schlesinger | November 23, 2025 | EASA22 | 1.21 |
Tina goes shopping with Linda for a new outfit for when she and her friends go see the Boyz4Now concert film. Tina picks out a skimpy tube top and Linda later admits to Bob that her unease over it is two-fold: her mom Gloria used to denigrate girls who dressed like "hoochies", and Linda had her own body issues when she was Tina's age. Bob says that Gloria was rarely right about anything and Tina doesn't have the same body image problems her mom had. When the top goes missing, Tina blames Linda, knowing she didn't approve. However, Tina realizes that she accidentally donated it with her old clothes to a thrift store and Linda takes Tina to recover it. They learn that Edith purchased it. Edith refuses to part with it until Linda buys it back from her. Linda recognizes that her unease was unfounded, and encourages Tina to wear the top and be proud of herself before dropping her off at the movie. Meanwhile, an exotic bird crashes into the restaurant's window and dies. Bob, feeling guilty, agrees to bury it. Afterward, Bob is horrified to learn the bird was a local pet named Zeus whose owner reported him missing. The group exhumes Zeus so the owner can have closure and say a heartfelt albeit strange goodbye.
| 306 | 8 | "Les Lizárdables" | Ryan Mattos | Steven Davis | December 7, 2025 | FASA02 | 1.12 |
Gene and Courtney find a five-lined skink outside and decide to take care of him. They name him Linus. Courtney becomes irritated when Gene only cares about being seen with Linus, rather than doing any of the labor of properly caring for him. Exhausted, she goes on vacation, leaving Gene responsible for him. Gene's carelessness while Gayle is staying over with her cats causes Linus to lose his tail. Devastated, Gene properly cares for him and informs Courtney. Incensed, Courtney plans to send Linus to her out of town cousin, who can properly care for him. Gene wishes to retain custody, and the argument is handled in Mr. Frond's student mediation program, where Courtney is granted full custody. However, Courtney sees that Gene really has learned how to properly care for Linus. The two then see that Linus has reached sexual maturity and release him into the wild together. Meanwhile, Gayle uses the Belchers' apartment to give pinching massages to clients. Her extended stay with her cats triggers Bob's allergies. Gayle offers to "cure" him with a pinch massage, and Bob reluctantly agrees. To everyone's surprise, it does improve his symptoms.
| 307 | 9 | "It's a Stunterful Life" | Brian Loschiavo | Lindsey Stoddart | December 14, 2025 | FASA03 | 0.94 |
The Belchers visit a Christmas tree farm that has set up a Christmas village for patrons to enjoy. The kids ride a slow-moving children's train but discover Logan there, who goads Louise into doing various stunts on the train. Eager to top each other's achievements, Louise does a stunt that accidentally causes a young child to lose his stuffed animal in a nearby tree. Louise takes one more ride and with Logan's help, manages to retrieve it while pulling off the best stunt of the night. Logan admits that competing with Louise was fun. Meanwhile, Linda is horrified to learn that the uglier trees are turned into woodchips and unsuccessfully tries to pawn the decrepit trees off to other patrons. She is surprised when Logan's mother, Cynthia, her arch-nemesis, actually prefers the ugly tree and buys it. In the cookie decorating hut, Bob becomes an inadvertent instructor and inspirational coach for patrons trying to learn how to be better cookie decorators. The Belchers leave together with several decrepit trees Linda has saved.
| 308 | 10 | "Heist Things Are Heist" | Chris Song | Scott Jacobson | December 28, 2025 | FASA01 | 1.15 |
Bob is elated when the business wins "Best Dive on the Mainland" by a King's Head Island cultural magazine. They attend the event, where they provide free sample sliders, but Bob is upset when he learns that the trophy is something he must pay $200 for in order to receive. Realizing that the "awards" are a scam designed to get "winning" businesses to provide free catering for the magazine's event, Bob becomes sullen and resentful. The kids are determined to steal the display trophy for Bob, and get advice from suspected jewel thief Vincent, who is also at the event. Using a decoy trophy made of molded fondant from another caterer's tent, the kids pull off the heist with Vincent's help, tricking everyone into thinking the display trophy fell into the ocean, while Louise has it hidden on her person. Meanwhile, Linda's bra is too tight, so she removes it. While initially self conscious, she later revels in the secret power of being bra-less around the party sophisticates. Later, while returning on the ferry, the kids present Bob with the trophy, which he excitedly accepts.
| 309 | 11 | "The Keyboard Kid" | Ian Hamilton | Rich Rinaldi | April 26, 2026 | FASA04 | 0.89 |
Tina enrolls in a typing class with Mr. Grant to get her grade point average up in time to attend a class rock climbing field trip with Jimmy Jr. She finds herself in opposition to Mr. Grant when her own way of typing proves as efficient as his home row method. When she demonstrates that she can type as fast as him, he is forced to give her an A, but schedules a mandatory test that will prevent her from attending the field trip. She challenges him to a typing contest, and despite her hands going numb in the third round, she prevails over Mr. Grant and enjoys the field trip with Jimmy Jr. Meanwhile, Bob helps Teddy build an Argentinian grill for a wealthy client, and they have a small party testing it out. Realizing their party was caught on the security camera, Bob and Linda help stage a fake assault that shows Teddy "defending" the grill from would-be assailants, in hopes that the additional footage will save Teddy's reputation. The client reviews it and is impressed, keeping Teddy as a contractor.
| 310 | 12 | "Children of the Carn" | Chris Song | Katie Crown | May 3, 2026 | FASA05 | 0.68 |
Rusty, a retired carnie hires the Belcher kids, Zeke, and Jimmy Jr. to prank his old estranged carnie friends. Rusty left the carnie life years ago following a settlement payout from an accident at Wonder Wharf, and hopes that restarting their tradition of hiding the koala in each other's homes will rekindle their friendship. The kids are caught by Rusty's friends, Sonny, Alphie, and Rita, who are furious at Rusty for abandoning them after his settlement. Rusty is devastated to hear that his old friends hate him. Louise proposes staging a funeral at Mort's to try to get them to remember their good times. During the funeral, Sonny's emotional eulogy causes Rusty to reveal the truth. Though initially upset, his friends reconcile with him when Rusty reveals that he still wears a shirt they all made years ago, showing he never forgot them, despite life circumstances getting in the way. Meanwhile, Teddy encounters his therapist at the restaurant and tries to avoid her. When he sees her strange eating habits, he is disgusted and plans to find a new therapist, but later relents when he thinks of all the ways she's helped him by listening to his problems.
| 311 | 13 | "Driving Miss Ragey" | Brian Loschavio | Lizzie Molyneux-Logelin & Wendy Molyneux | May 10, 2026 | FASA07 | 0.64 |
After a near-accident, Linda signs up for Nat's road rage help classes. Nat explains that her history with an abusive boss named Johnny Glow caused her road rage, until she realized she needed help. Linda identifies her own issues as stemming from her mother's road rage and anger at her life. However, after several failed sessions, Nat tells Linda she cannot help her and takes the wheel to drive them back. Suddenly, Nat recognizes Johnny Glow's car. She goes berserk, following him onto the ferry. Enraged, Nat rams the car with Johnny inside, intending to push it into the bay. Desperate to calm her, Linda admits that she feels resentment that her mother was so angry at her life despite Linda being a part of it. Linda realizes that having identified it, she can start letting it go. Satisfied, Nat reveals that this was all an elaborate ruse orchestrated by her and her friends to help push Linda to her breakthrough. Meanwhile, the kids rope Bob into having fun sliding down the stairs on an old mattress. They accidentally break the door, but fix it before Linda returns. Linda and Nat celebrate her breakthrough by riding down the stairs together.
| 312 | 14 | "Stuck in the Middle with Hu(go)" | Ian Hamilton | Jon Schroeder | May 17, 2026 | FASA08 | 0.83 |
Bob goes to the mall to make a return, but is trapped with Hugo when the elevator breaks down. Stuck, with the fix several hours away, Bob and Hugo express their mutual distaste for each other and argue about his stringent health inspector behavior. Hugo suspects that the food court workers whose businesses he inspected for fire ants are plotting against him, which proves true when the workers plan to dump the ants into the elevator to punish him. They offer to pull Bob out and leave Hugo to his fate, but Bob refuses, admitting that even stringent health inspectors help restaurant workers like himself stay safe. He reluctantly stays with Hugo in solidarity, and the workers back off just as the elevator regains power. Elsewhere, Tina is frantic when she loses Jimmy Jr.'s prized novelty ring that he asked her to hold onto while she was preparing a burger for Teddy. The Belcher kids suspect that it may have landed in the burger and that Teddy ate it unthinkingly. They try to get Teddy to poop it out through various methods. However, Linda finds the ring in the gap next to the grill and returns it to Jimmy Jr.
| 313 | 15 | "Smellbound" | Ryan Mattos | Dan Fybel | May 17, 2026 | FASA06 | 0.78 |
Seymour's Bay is beset by an enormous stench when thousands of dead fish wash ashore, causing the Ocean Avenue Business Association (OABA) to vote to cancel the town's annual Lighthouse Fire Hoax celebration. Desperate to save the celebration, the Belcher children collaborate with the school Thinkgeneers to figure out how to get rid of the fish by launching them into the bay with a trebuchet. OABA turns their idea down, so they instead turn to Mr. Fischoeder, asking him to convert one of his rides into the trebuchet. Fischoeder agrees to do it to spurn OABA, with whom he holds a grudge after he was voted out for misconduct. The makeshift trebuchet fails when the passenger cabin used to hold the fish cannot be opened remotely to properly launch them. The kids are crushed, but Bob, moved by their determination to save the celebration, volunteers to strap into the cabin, submerged in rotting fish, and open the hatch manually. Bob suffers through hundreds of launches, clearing the beach. On the last one, Bob is accidentally launched out to sea, but is unharmed. The celebration is back on, and Fischoeder, for his part in the plan, is allowed back on OABA.

== Release ==
The season premiered on September 28, 2025, as part of Fox's Animation Domination block alongside Krapopolis, Universal Basic Guys, and The Simpsons. It concluded on May 17, 2026.
