= Young Blood, Old Souls =

- The Owl House episode
- Title card of the episode
- Episode no.: Season 1 Episode 19
- Directed by: Stephen Sandoval
- Story by: Zach Marcus; Lee Knox Ostertag; John Bailey Owen; Dana Terrace; Rachel Vine
- Teleplay by: Dana Terrace; Rachel Vine
- Production code: 450H-121
- Original air date: August 29, 2020
- Running time: 22 minutes

Guest appearances
- Mela Lee as Kikimora; Bumper Robinson as Principal Bump; Matthew Rhys as Emperor Belos

Episode chronology
← Previous "Agony of a Witch"	Next → "Separate Tides"

"Young Blood, Old Souls" is the nineteenth episode and season finale of the first season of the American animated television series The Owl House, and the 19th episode overall. The episode was directed by Stephen Sandoval, and the teleplay was written by Dana Terrace and Rachel Vine, from a story by Zach Marcus, Lee Knox Ostertag, John Bailey Owen, Dana Terrace and Rachel Vine.

"Young Blood, Old Souls" was first released on DisneyNow and video on demand on August 29, 2020 and aired later that same day on Disney Channel. It received a mixed reception from critics.

== Plot ==
Continuing from "Agony of a Witch", Luz Noceda prepares herself to rescue Eda, with King joining her. King explains how magic was once wild, until a mysterious witch named Belos arrived, claiming that he could "speak to the island". Belos established the coven system, and eventually becoming Emperor of the Boiling Isles; witches who do not choose a coven are punished with petrification. Lilith brings her sister, Eda, to Belos in hopes that he will remove her curse. He instead orders Eda to be petrified, and for Lilith to destroy Eda's palisman, Owlbert.

Luz and King purposefully get caught committing a crime to get into the Conformatorium, where Eda is being held. Luz finds Eda and manages to speak to her in her monster form. Eda tells Luz that Belos wants the portal to the human world and that she needs to return home and destroy it. As Eda is taken away, Luz fights with Lilith, and they both pass through the portal to the human world. Lilith admits that cursing Eda was a mistake (she thought the curse would only last a day), as she wanted to get into the Emperor's Coven, but that Eda was willing to give it up for her. After returning Owlbert to Luz unharmed as a sign of trust, they return to the Boiling Isles together to rescue Eda.

Lilith plans to stay in the Emperor's Coven to spy on Belos, but she and King are captured, leaving Luz to confront Belos alone. Meanwhile, Willow and Gus rally the people in cheering for Eda's release. Luz, overpowered by Belos, is given the choice of giving up the portal to the human world (Belos claiming he has no intentions of world domination, instead of wanting it for another purpose), or having Eda suffer. Luz gives up the portal, but burns it upon leaving. Luz manages to rescue Eda, King, and Lilith, while Belos informs the citizens that Eda will be spared. After escaping, Lilith uses her magic to share Eda's curse, resulting in Eda returning to normal, but both her and Lilith's magic are weakened.

Later, Luz makes a video message for her mother, promising that she will find a way back home. Meanwhile, Belos sends a masked figure to spy on the residents of the Owl House while using the remains of the portal to construct another one.

== Production ==
=== Writing ===
The first letters of the episode titles for season one spell out "A WITCH LOSES A TRUE WAY", this episode being the "Y." It was revealed in this episode to be in reference to Luz losing her one "true way" home when she destroys the portal.

=== Casting ===
Sarah-Nicole Robles, Wendie Malick, and Alex Hirsch star as the voices of Luz Noceda, Edalyn "Eda" Clawthorne, and King respectively. Guest stars in the episode include Issac Ryan Brown as the voice of Augustus "Gus" Porter, Tati Gabrielle as the voice of Willow Park, Cissy Jones as the voice of Lilith Clawthorne, Mela Lee as the voice of Kikimora, Bumper Robinson as the voice of Hieronymus Bump, and Matthew Rhys as the voice of Emperor Belos, all recurring roles returning from previous episodes in the season.

Additional voices included Dee Bradley Baker, Matt Chapman, Arin Hanson, Abigail Zoe Lewis, Shannon McKain, Natalie Palamides, Lily Sanfelippo, Roger Craig Smith, Fred Tatasciore and Gary Anthony Williams.

=== Design ===
==== End credits sequence ====
This episode featured an update to the end credits sequence with Eda's gem and left eye having changed color, matching her appearance in this episode after Lilith shared Eda's curse.

== Release ==
"Young Blood, Old Souls" was first released on DisneyNow and video on demand on August 29, 2020 and first aired later that same day on Disney Channel.

== Reception ==
The A.V. Club's Kevin Johnson gave the episode a "B", stating the episode was an "enjoyable, tense, and intriguing finale" which also "inadvertently exposes the overall flaws" of the show. One such flaw Johnson felt was highlighted in this episode was the show's consistency with its depiction of magic, contrasting it to shows like Steven Universe and Gravity Falls which "really put in the work to make details cohere so that the overall world and premise stand out" while "The Owl House just feels shaky and broad". He did however praise the animation and art direction, stating that "the episode (and the show as a whole) really can bring some visceral power within the frame". Bubbleblabber's David Kaldor gave the episode a "5/10", stating that "aside from competently serving that purpose as a finale" he didn't have "many positive things to say about it".
