= Intruder =

Intruder may refer to:

== Film and television ==
=== Film ===
- The Intruder (1914 film), directed by Wallace Reid
- The Intruder (1933 film), an American film by Albert Ray
- The Intruder (1939 film), La intrusa, an Argentine film by Julio Saraceni
- The Intruder (1944 film), a 1944 Mexican film starring Carlos Orellana
- The Intruder (1953 film), a British post-war drama by Guy Hamilton
- The Intruder (1956 film), an Italian melodrama by Raffaello Matarazzo
- The Intruder (1962 film), an American racial segregation drama by Roger Corman
- The Intruder (1975 film), an American horror film
- The Intruder (1986 film), Pembalasan Rambu, an Indonesian action film by Jopi Burnama
- Intruder (1989 film), an American horror film by Scott Spiegel
- Intruder (1993 film), Intruso, a Spanish psychological thriller by Vicente Aranda
- The Intruder (1994 film), an Australian psychological drama by Richard Wolstencroft
- Intruder (1997 film), Hung bou gai, a Hong Kong horror thriller by Tsang Kan-cheung
- The Intruder (1999 film), a Canadian-British psychological thriller by David Bailey
- The Intruder (2004 film), L'intrus a French drama by Claire Denis
- The Intruder (2010 film), Khiao A-khat, a Thai horror film by Thanadol Nualsuth
- Intruder (2016 film), an American horror film by Travis Zariwny
- The Intruder (2017 film), a 2017 Italian drama film
- The Intruder (2019 film), an American psychological thriller film
- Intruder (2020 film), a South Korean mystery thriller film
- The Intruder (2020 film), an Argentine thriller film

=== Television ===
- Intruder (TV series), a 2021 British miniseries
- The Intruder (TV series), an eight-part British children's drama series from 1972
- "The Intruder" (Captain Power and the Soldiers of the Future), a 1987 episode
- "The Intruder" (The Owl House), a 2020 episode
- "The Intruder" (Stargate Atlantis), a 2005 episode
- The Intruder, a 2025 French language psycho drama in 4 episodes.

== Literature ==
- Intruder, a 1990 science fiction novel by Robert Thurston in the Isaac Asimov's Robots and Aliens series
- Intruder (novel), a 2012 novel set in C. J. Cherryh's Foreigner universe
- The Intruder (D'Annunzio novel), an 1892 novel by Gabriele D'Annunzio
- The Intruder (Spanish: El Intruso), a 1904 novel by Vicente Blasco Ibáñez
- The Intruder, a 1915 novel by Harold Bindloss
- The Shades Will Not Vanish, a 1952 Australian novel by Helen Fowler, published in the US as The Intruder
- The Intruder, a 1956 novel by Storm Jameson
- The Intruder, a 1959 novel by Charles Beaumont
- The Intruder, a 1959 novel by Mary Howard
- The Intruder, a 1965 novel by Dorothy Mackie Low
- The Intruder: A Novel of Boston a 1965 novel by Anton Myrer
- The Intruder (Townsend novel), a 1969 children's novel by John Rowe Townsend
- The Intruder, a 1976 novel by Jane Donnelly
- The Intruder, a 1979 novel by Gillian Tindall
- The Intruder, a 1984 novel by Richard Laymon
- The Intruder, a 1985 novel by Campbell Armstrong under the pen name Thomas Altman
- The Intruder, a 1996 novel by Peter Blauner
- The Intruder, a 1997 novel by Rowena Cory Lindquist
- The Intruder, a 1999 novel by Melinda Metz, the fifth installment in the Roswell High series

== Theatre ==
- Intruder (play), an 1891 play by Belgian playwright Maurice Maeterlinck
- The Intruder, a 1908 play by Anthony E. Wills
- The Intruder, a 1928 play by Paul Eldridge

== Military and technology ==
- Intruder (air combat), an air combat mission in which fighter aircraft penetrate enemy airspace at night in order to interdict enemy air operations by ambushing enemy aircraft
- Intruder (satellite), a spy satellite system by the US National Reconnaissance Office
- Grumman A-6 Intruder, an American military aircraft
- Suzuki Intruder, a cruiser-type motorcycle
- Operation Whitebait, a notable WWII example of intruder operations

== Music ==
- Intruder (Serbian band), a Serbian electronica/pop band
- Intruder (American band), a 1980s American thrash metal band
- "Intruder" (song), a 1980 song by the British singer Peter Gabriel
- "Intruder" (album), a 2021 album by Gary Numan
- "Intruder", an instrumental by Van Halen from the 1982 album Diver Down
- “Intruder”, a 2023 song by LongestSoloEver based on The Mandela Catalogue

== Other uses ==
- Intruder (board game), a 1980 solitaire science fiction game
- Trespasser
- "The Intruder", a nickname used by Jesse Hernandez

== See also ==
- Intruders (disambiguation)
- Intrusion, a geological rock formation
- Intrusion (disambiguation)
- Intruso (disambiguation)
- La Intrusa (disambiguation)
