= A Lying Witch and a Warden =

- The Owl House episode
- Episode no.: Season 1 Episode 1
- Directed by: Stephen Sandoval
- Story by: Dana Terrace; Rachel Vine; Zach Marcus; John Bailey Owen
- Teleplay by: Dana Terrace; Rachel Vine
- Production code: 450H-101
- Original air date: January 10, 2020
- Running time: 22 minutes

Guest appearances
- Elizabeth Grullon as Camila Noceda; Roger Craig Smith as Warden Wrath; Grey Griffin as Katya; Dana Terrace as Tinella Nosa

Episode chronology
← Previous —	Next → "Witches Before Wizards"

"A Lying Witch and a Warden" is the series premiere of the American animated television series The Owl House. In the episode, Luz Noceda, a 14-year-old Afro-Dominican-American girl known for being unpredictable and troublesome, accidentally stumbles upon a portal to the Demon Realm, where she arrives at the Boiling Isles, an archipelago. To help get home to her own world, she is enlisted as the helper of rebellious witch Eda Clawthorne.

The episode premiered on January 10, 2020 on Disney Channel and garnered 0.61 million viewers when it premiered, receiving a mixed reception from audiences. The episode's title is a word play on the title of the C. S. Lewis novel The Lion, the Witch and the Wardrobe, which also features a girl who discovers an unassuming portal into a parallel fantasy world.

== Plot ==
External videos
- A Lying Witch and a Warden S1 E1 Full Episode The Owl House @disneychannelanimation — Official upload of the episode onto YouTube

Luz Noceda, a 14-year-old Afro-Dominican-American girl, struggles at school due to her wild and imaginative personality. Luz's mother, Camila, decides to send her to a conformist summer camp; however, on the day she is to leave, an owl steals her favorite book. Pursuing the owl, she inadvertently passes through a door into a flea market in another world. She retrieves her book, but the magical door closes, trapping her.

The owner of the market stand introduces herself as Eda the Owl Lady, who has been using the door and owl to steal human items to sell. Eda is unfamiliar with these items, throwing away several valuables in preference of novelty toys, and takes a shine to Luz after her human knowledge of how they function attracts customers. Authorities come to arrest Eda for unsanctioned witchcraft and Luz, but they escape using Eda's staff to the Owl House, Eda's residence. Luz learns that she is in a world called the Boiling Isles, where human myths originate. At the Owl House she meets "the King of Demons", a small and unassuming creature whom she immediately adores. King's Crown of Power was stolen by the warden of the Conformatorium, where people the Boiling Isles deem unfit for society are housed. As the forcefield protecting the crown can only be breached by a human, Eda and King enlist Luz's help to break in, for which they return her home.

In the Conformatorium, Luz discovers that the prisoners' crimes are simply "being different", like herself. The three eventually reunite at the top of the tower and retrieve the crown with Luz's help. However, it is another worthless human artifact: a kid's meal crown with only sentimental value to King. The warden and guards appear, capturing them. The warden attempts to coerce Eda into a date with him, attracted to her elusive nature. The three fend off the guards and flee, freeing the prisoners. Eda, fearing for Luz's safety, gives her the key home; however, Luz returns and leads a prisoners' revolt, helping defeat the warden. Eda keeps her promise and allows Luz to return to her world; however, she decides to stay in the Boiling Isles after thinking through how people had treated her on Earth. Eda lets her stay for the summer, on the condition that Luz works for her and becomes her apprentice.

== Production ==
Before the episode was released to the general public, the show had been renewed by The Walt Disney Company for a full second season. According to show creator Dana Terrace, the main character of the series, Luz Noceda had an emotional journey similar to Terrace's in terms of trying to find a community when she was a creative person. Voice actors Sarah-Nicole Robles and Alex Hirsch in an interview with Comic Book Resources said that they had thought Luz was a person who had been artistically restricted by the society created around her.

== Critical reception ==
Dave Trumbore, writer for the film website Collider, gave a highly positive review of the episode, saying that the episode was a promising start to the series. He praised the relationship brought upon by Luz Noceda and Eda Clawthorne, along with a "balanced mix of chaos, ingenuity, and cuteness" in the episode.

Kevin Johnson, writer for The A.V. Club, praised the magical world brought by the Boiling Isles, comparing the magic of the world to fellow Disney Channel show Gravity Falls. Johnson also criticized the warden's motivation for feeling like a "fakeout".

The episode, along with the show itself faced criticism by many Christian groups. The Christian Broadcasting Network panned the show for portraying witchcraft as a positive idea to fight evil, along with the group believing that the show promoted children into believing that evil and demons were good. One Million Moms, a group by the American Family Association that has the stated goal to "stop the exploitation of children" by the media, started a petition to get the show off the air.
