= Invasive =

Invasive may refer to:

- Invasive (medical) procedure
- Invasive species
- Invasive observation, especially in reference to surveillance
- Invasively progressive spread of disease from one organ in the body to another, especially in reference to cancer, see invasion (cancer)

== See also ==
- Intruder (disambiguation)
- Invasion (disambiguation)
- Intrusive (disambiguation)
- Invasive procedure (disambiguation)
