= L'Intruse =

L'Intruse may refer to:

- Intruder (play), a 1890 one-act play by Belgian playwright Maurice Maeterlinck
- The Intruder (2025 TV series), a French TV thriller
