= Intruso =

Intruso is the Spanish word for "Intruder". It may refer to:

- Intruso, Spanish film
- El intruso (1944 film), Mexican film
- El Intruso (1999 film), Colombian film
- Intrusos en el espectáculo, Argentine TV program, usually shortened to "Intrusos"

== See also ==
- Intruder (disambiguation)
