= Intrusive =

Intrusive may refer to:

- Intrusiveness, a typically unwelcome behavior, interrupting and disturbing to others
- Intrusive rock, intrusion of molten magma leaving behind igneous rock
- Saltwater intrusion, the movement of saline water into freshwater aquifers
- Intrusive thought, an unwelcome involuntary thought, image, or unpleasant idea
- Linking and intrusive R, in phonetics

== See also ==
- Intruder (disambiguation)
- Invasive (disambiguation)
