= Enchanting Grom Fright =

- The Owl House episode
- Title card of the episode
- Episode no.: Season 1 Episode 16
- Directed by: Stu Livingston
- Story by: Dana Terrace; Rachel Vine; Lee Knox Ostertag
- Teleplay by: Lee Knox Ostertag
- Production code: 450H-117
- Original air date: August 8, 2020
- Running time: 22 minutes

Guest appearances
- Erica Lindbeck as Emira Blight; Ryan O'Flanagan as Edric; Elizabeth Grullon as Camila-Gromila; Bumper Robinson as Principal Bump; Kimberly D. Brooks as Skara

Episode chronology
← Previous "Understanding Willow"	Next → "Wing It Like Witches"

"Enchanting Grom Fright" is the sixteenth episode of the first season of the American animated television series The Owl House, and the 16th episode overall. The episode first aired on Disney Channel in the United States on August 8, 2020. It was directed by Stu Livingston, and the teleplay was written by Lee Knox Ostertag, from a story by Ostertag, Rachel Vine and series creator Dana Terrace.

The episode was noted by several critics for its reveal that secondary character Amity Blight has a crush on Luz Noceda, with many seeing it as a major step for LGBT representation in Disney media. Terrace, who is bisexual, said that she has wanted to include a bisexual character in the series, but initially struggled to get approval from Disney executives, though Disney eventually approved it.

== Plot ==
While learning to make a Plant spell, Luz receives a text from her mother, Camila, asking how she is. Luz panics, as her mother believes that she is in a summer camp, and is unaware that she is in another world learning magic. After arriving at Hexside, Luz discovers from her friends Willow and Gus that a ceremony called "Grom", which somewhat resembles a prom, is being held at the school. Luz's other friend, Amity, is selected as the "Grom Queen", much to Luz's joy. However, Amity is worried about being chosen, since the Grom Queen must fight against Grometheus, a monster living below the school that takes the form of anybody's worst fears, to prevent it from escaping and consuming the Boiling Isles.

Upon returning to the Owl House, Luz learns that her mentor, Eda, will be chaperoning at Grom, while their roommate, King, will emcee the dance with Gus. Later, while walking through the forest, she finds Amity, who reveals that she will no longer be Grom Queen if she can find a replacement, to which Luz offers herself. The next day, Amity and her siblings, Edric and Emira, help Luz prepare to fight Grometheus by creating illusions of her worst fears. That night, during the Grom dance, King is revealed to have stage fright and struggles to work as an emcee. Later, Luz's duel starts, and initially manages to hold off against Grometheus, until it takes the form of her greatest fear: her mother discovering she lied and never went to camp. Terrified, Luz runs from the school, causing everyone to panic, until King overcomes his stage fright and directs the students towards the fight.

As Luz tries to run from Grometheus, Amity steps in to help Luz. As Amity faces Grometheus, the monster manifests Amity's greatest fear, revealed to be rejection from an unknown individual whom she wanted to ask Grom as her date. Luz comforts Amity and offers to accompany her instead. Luz and Amity then defeat Grometheus together. As everyone celebrates their victory, Luz asks whom Amity wanted to be her date, but Amity dismisses the subject and throws her Grom letter away—revealed to the audience to have been addressed to Luz.

Back in the Owl House, Luz finally sends a text back to her mother. However, it is revealed that someone has been sending Camila letters while claiming to be Luz.

== Production ==
"Enchanting Grom Fright" was written by Lee Knox Ostertag under a story from Ostertag, series creator Dana Terrace, and Rachel Vine, with storyboards by Charlie Bryant, Emmy Cicierega, Cat Harman-Mitchell, Hayley Foster, Madeleine Flores, Chris Pianka, and Spencer Wan. The episode was directed by Stu Livingston.

Terrace has wanted to create an episode for the series centered on a prom-like concept ever since starting development on the show. She has also wanted to feature main LGBT characters in the series, as she is bisexual herself. However, while the idea has been "extremely supported" by executives at Disney, it was initially unapproved by "a certain Disney leadership", but was eventually approved. Wan, who storyboarded the dance sequence in the episode with Foster, referred to it as "the gay thing", and said that it was the first opportunity he had to storyboard "anything even remotely queer".

Early drafts for the episode had a different prom-like concept, in which "P.R.O.M." were the initials for "Perennial Ritual Offering Maiden", but was later changed during production.

== Reception ==
Luz Noceda and Amity Blight dance.

The episode received universal acclaim. Several critics highlighted the episode due to its confirmation of Amity's crush towards Luz. Several news outlets, such as Variety and NY Post said that the episode "made history" for including Disney's first main bisexual character. Marcelo Garcia of CBR said that the episode was "a tremendous step in the right direction for Disney, a company that has struggled with LGBTQ+ representation in recent years."

Other critics also reviewed the episode positively. For instance, Palmer Harsch of Insider wrote that the episode "helped Disney Channel make a major step forward in terms of LGBTQ representation", and hoped the episode could serve as "a harbinger of further LGBTQ stories to come on Disney Channel." Similarly, Kirby Beaton of BuzzFeed argued that "queer content on the Disney Channel is a huge stride in queer representation" while Matt Tracy of Gay City News stated that the series' portrayal of LGBT characters is "a refreshing development considering the lack of queer representation in animated television during recent years." Additionally, Petrana Radulovic of Polygon praised the dance sequence between Luz and Amity as "ADORABLE and beautifully animated." At the same time, some argued that the show's LGBTQ representation falls on the shoulders of the writers and creators of The Owl House instead of Disney while Michele Kirichanskaya of The Mary Sue wrote that shows like The Owl House, in tandem with She-Ra and the Princesses of Power, and The Prom, it breaks down "old heteronormative traditions" of prom itself. Mey Rude of Out, reviewing a season 2 episode "Through the Looking Glass Ruins," described this episode as one of "season one's gayest episodes" along with "Wing It Like Witches."

PFLAG praised the series for its LGBTQ+ visibility, while GLAAD similarly praised it for having an "inclusive, fair, accurate, and age-appropriate world through the representation of its characters". Doc McStuffins creator Chris Nee praised the series' inclusivity towards LGBTQ+ characters, while also noting how she struggled with including a multiracial lesbian couple in the Doc McStuffins episode "The Emergency Plan". Similarly, The Owl House voice actor Alex Hirsch thanked Terrace and the production team for including LGBT characters, while noting how he was forbidden to include LGBT characters in his own show, Gravity Falls. Hirsch also commented how the dancing sequence would be considered "inappropriate" by Disney in 2012, saying that Disney "did good" by allowing the scene to be featured. Also, ND Stevenson, creator of She-Ra and the Princesses of Power, invited his wife and the episode's co-writer, Lee Knox Ostertag, to Grom, sharing "Grom experience" both had experienced with followers of each person.
