= Intrusion (disambiguation) =

An igneous intrusion is a form of geologic feature.

Intrusion may also refer to:

- Saltwater intrusion, the movement of saline into freshwater aquifers
- Intrusion (orthodontics), the movement of a tooth into bone
- Intrusion, an object on a page which causes a textual runaround (typography)
- Intrusion (play), an American play by Qurrat Ann Kadwani
- Intrusion (film), a 2021 American psychological thriller
- Intrusion (novel), a 2012 British sci-fi novel by Ken MacLeod

== See also ==
- Intruder (disambiguation)
- Intruders (disambiguation)
- Intruso (disambiguation)
- Extrusion
