= Amity Blight =

Fictional character from The Owl House

- The Owl House character
- Amity as she appears in season 1 and the first five episodes of season 2.
- First appearance: "I Was a Teenage Abomination"; The Owl House; January 24, 2020
- Last appearance: "The Owl House: The Long-Lived King"; The Owl House; September 29, 2026
- Created by: Dana Terrace
- Voiced by: Mae Whitman

In-universe information
- Species: Witch
- Gender: Female
- Family: Odalia Blight (mother); Alador Blight (father); Edric Blight (older brother); Emira Blight (older sister)
- Significant other: Luz Noceda (girlfriend)
- Home: Bonesborough, Boiling Isles
- Abilities: Flight (via witch's staff); Magic (via finger-drawn circles); Abomination magic (creating and controlling golem-like constructs)

Amity Blight is a fictional character in the Disney Channel series The Owl House. She is voiced by Mae Whitman.

She has been well received by both critics and fans of the show, who praised her character development and Whitman's performance.

== Character ==
Amity Blight is a 14-year-old inhabitant of the Boiling Isles, an archipelago located in the Demon Realm. The Demon Realm is a realm apart from the Human Realm, which can be accessed through the means of portals, or as shown in the series, a magical door. She has very pale, white skin, short hair and an undercut (which she has dyed both green and purple throughout the series), yellow eyes, and usually wears black, long-sleeved blouse, red wine-colored pants, and black slip-on shoes while she is out of school. While at Hexside, she wears her chosen Track clothes, which include long, pink sleeves and socks, and a black uniform. She has a fighting style some have called "unorthodox". Terrace also said she considered Amity "more of a jock" than having a "punk aesthetic".

Amity undergoes a major character development through the course of the series. She originally starts out as a snobbish student in her first appearance, who belittles her peers (like Willow), due to her superior control and overall performance in Abomination magic. Her grades, coupled with the influence her family has over the school, meant she could be hardly touched by anyone and was beloved by her teachers. However, as the series progressed, it was revealed that Amity was not a standard bully she appeared to be; she has a complex trauma and a case of self-loathing from her toxic upbringing, including emotional abuse from her mother Odalia and bullying from her siblings Emira and Edric, despite the fact that her father would later support her. Due to her mother's blackmail and threats towards Willow, she was forced to put on a façade. In episodes from "Lost in Language" to "Understanding Willow", it was evident that Amity's harsh and cruel behavior was merely a façade and that she never wanted to hurt Willow but was forced to do so. She had also pretended to be friends with Boscha and her gang. Amity's desire for real friends and her longing for love and respect were evident throughout the series. Likewise, her enthusiasm for joining the Emperor's Coven was forced upon her by her mother, and she hoped to gain love and respect from her family through it. However, when Luz enters her life, Amity finally begins to come out of the shell that her mother forced her in, and Amity becomes a better person for it, regaining her friendship with Willow and eventually falling in love with Luz. This character shift is given a further visual signifier in the episode "Through the Looking Glass Ruins", when Amity's green hair—the color representative of the façade curated by Odalia—is re-dyed purple as a show of her newfound individuality.

Whitman, Amity's voice actor, described Amity as complex, complicated, with issues, and "dealing with some stuff". She also noted that when Amity was with Luz, Amity tapped into her softer, "more vulnerable side".

=== Creation ===
On September 3, 2020, during an AMA on Reddit, Terrace stated that during the show's development, Amity had a different hairstyle, and that the look changed after the unaired, unanimated pilot, when she decided that the style used in the show would look "better for the character".

=== LGBTQ+ representation ===
On July 7, 2020, when responding to a fan who posted a still of Amity putting her hands on Luz's shoulder, from a promotion for the upcoming episode "Enchanting Grom Fright" on Twitter, Terrace said that there is no heterosexual explanation for the moment. On September 2, during a Reddit AMA, Dana Terrace confirmed that Amity is intended to be a lesbian and that Luz is bisexual. She also stated that the relationship between Amity and Luz would be explored in season 2 and that Luz is "oblivious to some things in front of her", including Amity's crush on her. In the same AMA, Terrace stated that Luz was Amity's first crush and that she was thrilled to see people connect to the show's characters, like Luz and Amity. In October 2022, Amity's voice actress, Mae Whitman, said that voicing Amity gave her the bravery to come out as pansexual.

== Role in The Owl House ==
=== Season 1 ===
Amity, a student at Hexside School of Magic and Demonics, loses her beloved top student badge to Willow Park after she cheated on her abomination homework with Luz Noceda. Sometime later, she runs into Luz at the annual Covention. Angry with Luz over what happened, Amity mocks her for trying to be a witch, and they eventually agree to a witches' duel. Later on in the season, Amity has Luz and her own siblings, Emira and Edric, thrown out of the library for messing around. However, both Amity and Luz are forced to work together to save themselves from a magical character spawned from a book. After Luz has been accepted into Hexside, Amity tells her she must master two spells in order to attend classes with her. Thanks to Luz's support, Amity regains her friendship with Willow that was previously strained under her parents' influences, ending her fake association with Boscha. For Grom night, Amity is chosen as the Grom Queen, meaning she must enter the school's dungeon and fight Grometheus, a shape-shifting demon that can manifest into the greatest fear of the person fighting it. Luz steps in to replace her in the fight, but Amity has to jump in to save her. At one point, it is revealed Luz was the person she intended to ask out for the dance, and her greatest fear was being rejected by her. After Willow and Gus are forced to quit Luz's grudgby team due to her harsh training, Amity reveals to her that she experienced something similar. Although they narrowly lose a grudgby game, they all gain sympathy and respect of Boscha's teammates. However, Amity hurts her leg in the match, and is taken care of by Luz, further deepening their bond.

=== Season 2 ===
Amity's parents, Odalia and Alador, have her friends expelled from Hexside, as they deem them as bad influences on her. Amity later saves Luz from the Abomatons created by the family company, and finally stands up to her mother, staying by Luz's side despite Odalia's threats. As she works at the Bonesborough Library, Amity lends Luz her library card, so that she can access Philip Wittebane's diary, stored in the forbidden section of the library. They enter together, eventually find the diary. They were both caught and as punishment, Malphas, the librarian, fires Amity and confiscates her card, before Amity heads off to her home. When we see her inside the Blight Manor, she reveals to her siblings that she is troubled due to her feelings for Luz; at this juncture, she has her siblings re-dye her hair purple, in defiance of their mother's desire for Amity's hair to remain dyed green. Luz ends up getting Amity re-hired off screen as Amity is inside with Edric and Emira, and opens the diary, only to reveal that an echo-mouse has eaten the contents. Luz gets frustrated, but Amity teaches her about the species and how they can play back what they eat. She then mentions Luz's ability to sneak into peoples hearts before she kisses Luz on the cheek, but immediately leaves the scene embarrassed, not knowing Luz is flattered. Later in the season, Amity is suddenly kidnapped by Hooty and enters a tunnel of love with Luz. She realizes that Luz is interested in her until she destroys the tunnel out of embarrassment, convincing Amity she doesn't love her back. Luz later explains she thought Amity was too cool to be in there with her. Afterwards, they both ask each other out and become a couple. When Luz is sick, Amity goes with Eda and King to retrieve Titan's Blood from Eclipse Lake and duels against Hunter for the Blood, and manages to get some of it in her glove. In the same season, she and Luz establish a writing club and Amity enters the Bonesborough Brawl to prove herself to Alador. She is later grounded by Odalia but is saved by Luz and Amity kisses her for the first time. Alongside her friends, Amity confronts her parents to get them to stop producing Abomatons for the Emperor and learns that Odalia is sticking with Belos, so she furiously disowns her, and destroys the factory with help from Alador. After the Day of Unity begins, Amity, along with Willow, Gus, and Hunter, helps Luz fight a transformed Belos. She and her friends are sent through a portal by King, who did so to save them, and they find themselves in the Human Realm, meeting Luz's mother, Camila, for the first time.

=== Season 3 ===
A few months later, Amity grows accustomed to life in Gravesfield, but she, and her friends, are continuously looking for ways to get back to the Demon Realm. After Flapjack, Hunter's palisman, finds a hidden scroll that appears to lead to a supply of Titan's Blood, but the scroll is taken from her by a Belos' possessed Hunter, who activates a portal to the Demon Realm in a cemetery after Hunter expelled him from his body. After a guilt-stricken Luz reveals she accidentally introduced Belos to magic when she traveled back in time to meet him when he was originally known as Philip Wittebane, Amity reassures her and tells her she won't leave her, while they cross the portal into the Demon Realm, with Luz and Camila soon following. Amity and the others come across The Boiling Isles after it had been taken over by the Collector, where many of the residents have been turned into puppets. Many of Amity's classmates are in hiding at Hexside to avoid being captured. She confronts Boscha for the first time in months, where she asks Amity to be her friend again. Disgusted, Amity turns her down and cuts ties with her for good, but she and the others help Luz defeat Kikimora after she had disguised herself as a Hexside student. In the aftermath, after witnessing the birth of Luz’s palisman Stringbean, Amity and the others are captured by the Collector and turned into puppets, in which she tells Luz to use a light glyph to protect herself. After Amity carves a light glyph, she and the others are freed and find themselves in the Archives but saw that Camila is stuck in her collected form. After witnessing Luz’s “death”, Amity and her friends later free Camila from her puppet state thanks to a light glyph. Realizing that everyone is exhausted and had never rested in days, Camila tells them to rescue the puppets with glyphs, only to find out that The Collector is helping them by keeping the Archive House safe. After Luz defeats Emperor Belos with Eda, King, and Raine Whispers’ help, and the rest of the people return to normal, Amity befriends The Collector and greets her girlfriend in open arms and they share a kiss. Years later, on Luz's 18th birthday, Amity (now a engineer and construction worker) and the others surprise Luz with a "King-ceañera" for helping rebuild the Isles on her previous birthdays since. The Collector, who had been redeemed before Belos' defeat, returns with fireworks as everyone including Luz and Amity watch together.

== Reception ==
Amity's character was received positively. She was described by Jade King of The Gamer as engaging in a "necessary queer rebellion" whose lesbian identity plays into her character arc. King also described Amity as "deep, a bully turned rebel" like Luz. King compared Amity's character to Katara in Avatar: The Last Airbender, since Whitman is the voice actress of both characters, and argued there are similarities between these two characters. Joshua Fox of Screen Rant praised the storyline around "Amity being lesbian and having a crush on Luz", and Tegan Hall of the same publication praised Amity's character for being ambitious, caring, nerdy, and protective. James Troughton of The Gamer argued that the "unashamed queerness on screen" in the series is displayed by Amity and her friend, Luz. However, Kevin Johnson of The A.V. Club was critical of the series, stating that he wasn't "buying the developments between Amity and Luz" and said that trying to find depth in Amity's characters while "ignoring her earlier treatments towards Luz... is disingenuous".

Others praised Amity's character evolving outside her "relationship with Luz" and the growing romantic relationship between Amity and Luz. This included the season 1 episode "Enchanting Grom Fright", when Amity and Luz dance together for the first time and the season 2 episode "Through the Looking Glass Ruins". The latter episode received significant attention and press over Luz and Amity's growing relationship and its ending, in which Amity kisses Luz on the cheek. Amity's relationship with Luz, known as "Lumity", was chosen by fans as a top ship on Tumblr in 2021, and otherwise garnered attention from fans and critics.
