= Intruders =

Intruders or The Intruders may refer to:

== Film ==
- The Intruders (1947 film), a 1947 animated cartoon short featuring Heckle and Jeckle
- The Intruders (1969 film), a spin-off of the Australian TV series Skippy the Bush Kangaroo
- The Intruders (1970 film), an American Western film
- Intruders (2011 film), a supernatural horror film
- Intruders (2013 film), a South Korean film
- Intruders (2015 film), an American horror thriller film
- The Intruders (2015 film), a Canadian thriller film starring Miranda Cosgrove

== Literature ==
- Intruders: The Incredible Visitations at Copley Woods, a 1987 non-fiction book by Budd Hopkins
- Intruders: New Weird Tales, a 1995 short story collection by A. M. Burrage
- Naruto: Intruders, a 2008 chapter book by Tracey West, based on the manga series Naruto
- Intruders, a 2018 short story collection by Mohale Mashigo
- The Intruders, an 1898 novel by Lucy Bethia Walford
- "The Intruders", a 1923 poem by James Rorty
- The Intruders, a 1946 novel by Robert Bright
- The Intruders, a 1962 novel by Lionel Fanthorpe under the pen name Bron Fane
- The Intruders, a 1975 non-fiction book by Patricia Montandon
- The Intruders, a 1976 novel by Hugh Garner
- The Intruders (novel), a 1994 novel by Stephen Coonts
- The Intruders, a 2007 novel by Michael Marshall Smith
- The Intruders, a 2023 novel by Brian Pinkerton

== Television ==
=== Episodes ===
- "Intruders", Buccaneer episode 9 (1980)
- "Intruders", E.N.G. season 3, episode 6 (1991)
- "Intruders", Fireball episode 11 (2008)
- "Intruders", In the Heat of the Night season 2, episode 14 (1989)
- "Intruders", Men Behaving Badly series 1, episode 1 (1992)
- "Intruders", Nurses season 3, episode 3 (1993)
- "Intruders", Prospectors season 2, episode 2 (2013)
- "Intruders", Reign season 3, episode 17 (2016)
- "Intruders", The Haunting Hour: The Series season 3, episode 5 (2012)
- "Intruders", The Red Road season 2, episode 3 (2015)
- "Intruders", The Strain season 2, episode 8 (2015)
- "The Intruders", Adam-12 (1990) season 2, episode 3 (1991)
- "The Intruders", Adventures in Paradise season 2, episode 2 (1960)
- "The Intruders", Dixon of Dock Green series 12, episode 11 (1965)
- "The Intruders", ITV Sunday Night Theatre season 5, episode 29 (1973)
- "The Intruders", Lawman season 1, episode 10 (1958)
- "The Intruders", Ohara season 2, episode 6 (1987)
- "The Intruders", Starr and Company episode 74 (1958)
- "The Intruders", The Adventures of Robin Hood series 1, episode 20 (1956)
- "The Intruders", The Long, Hot Summer episode 19 (1966)
- "The Intruders", The Monroes episode 1 (1966)
- "The Intruders!", The Raccoons season 1, episode 7 (1986)
- "The Intruders", The Virginian season 2, episode 23 (1964)
- "The Intruders", The Waltons season 4, episode 14 (1975)

=== Series ===
- Intruders (miniseries), a 1992 American television miniseries
- Intruders (TV series), a 2014 British/American drama series

== Other uses ==
- Intruders (G.I. Joe), a line of action figures
- The Intruders (band), a 1960s/1970s American soul group
- The Intruders (comics), a group of Marvel Comics supervillains

== See also ==
- Intruder (disambiguation)
- Intrusion (disambiguation)
