= Knights of Guinevere =

Australian animated web series

- Genre: Adult animation; Psychological thriller; Science fiction; Horror
- Created by: Dana Terrace; Zach Marcus; John Bailey Owen
- Showrunner: Dana Terrace
- Written by: Dana Terrace; Zach Marcus; John Bailey Owen
- Directed by: Dana Terrace
- Voices of: Eden Riegel; Michaela Laws; Zelda Khan Black; Kayleigh McKee; Erin Nichole Lundquist; Lauren Kong; SungWon Cho
- Composers: Aaron Olson; Leland Cox
- Country of origin: Australia
- Original language: English
- No. of seasons: 1
- No. of episodes: 2

Production
- Executive producers: Kevin Lerdwichagul; Luke Lerdwichagul; Dana Terrace; Zach Marcus; John Bailey Owen
- Editor: Adam Smith
- Running time: 26–28 minutes
- Production company: Glitch Productions

Original release
- Network: YouTube
- Release: 19 September 2025 – present

Knights of Guinevere is an Australian independent adult animated web series created by Dana Terrace, Zach Marcus, and John Bailey Owen, directed by Terrace, and produced by Glitch Productions. It is the first traditionally-animated series produced by the studio. The series revolves around two friends who find and attempt to repair an android amusement park mascot, unaware of what lies in store for them. The pilot episode was released on 19 September 2025, and was well received by critics.

== Synopsis ==
Knights of Guinevere centres around Park Planet, a floating, planet-spanning amusement park with an android princess named Guinevere serving as its mascot. Living in the town of M7 on the surface below are Andi, an engineer and android surgeon working for the park, and Frankie, a factory worker and scrap-scavenger, both of whom are overworked and tired of their jobs. When Frankie comes across a damaged Guinevere android, the two friends sneak into the park's secret labs in order to repair it, unaware of what lies in wait for them.

== Characters ==
- Guinevere (voiced by Eden Riegel), the android mascot and "princess" of Park Planet.
- Francesca "Frankie" DeLeo (voiced by Michaela Laws), a factory labourer who also helps Sparky salvage scrap for money. She is Andi's close friend and roommate.
- Andrea "Andi" Domingo (voiced by Zelda Khan Black), an android surgeon who formerly worked for Park Planet. She is Frankie's close friend and roommate.
- Sparky (voiced by Kayleigh McKee), an older man who runs a salvage boat by day and is a crime lord by night.
- Olivia Park (voiced by Erin Nicole Lundquist while old, and Lauren Kong while young), the daughter of Orville Park. In the present, she is old and bedridden, taken care of by various attendants.
- Orville Park (voiced by SungWon Cho), the father of Olivia, the creator of Park Planet, and one of its public faces.
- Patience (voiced by Sarah-Nicole Robles), Chief of Operations for Olivia and Park Planet.
- Krash (voiced by Zeno Robinson), an underground doctor who works for Sparky.

== Episodes ==
No.	Title	Animation directed by	Storyboarded by	Original release date
1	"Pilot"	Kofi Fiagome	Dana Terrace (lead); Zach Marcus	19 September 2025
Orville Park presents Park Planet, a floating theme park, as a gift to his daughter, Olivia. The android mascot of the park, Guinevere, attempts to escape. Later on, two children, Andi and Frankie, meet Guinevere while sneaking into the park. Several years later, Andi and Frankie live and work together in the industrial wasteland below Park Planet. During her daily salvage work, Frankie finds a damaged and inactive Guinevere android. Frankie is determined to fix the android, though her boss, Sparky, cautions her against it. Later, Frankie goes to retrieve Guinevere, assisted by Andi, who was recently fired from her job as an android engineer. Sparky agrees to let them go after Andi agrees to turn Guinevere over to him upon fixing her. On their way to Park Planet's underwater labs, Andi and Frankie are wounded by a large armoured robot sent by an elderly and distraught Olivia. Guinevere defeats the robot when briefly regaining activeness, and they get her to a repair station. She reboots, and immediately recognises Andi and Frankie.
2	"Wolves Around the Corner"	Douglas De Azevedo	Dana Terrace (lead); Moss Lawton & Anna Lencioni	9 October 2026
Having passed out from their injuries, Andi and Frankie are brought back out of the labs by Guinevere. A frustrated Olivia issues orders to hasten the search and recovery of Guinevere. Andi and Frankie deliver Guinevere to Sparky's associate Krash for further repairs. There, Andi and Frankie argue over Sparky's abusive nature, which triggers a traumatic flashback within Guinevere of her abuse under Olivia and Orville. Guinevere flees into a nearby nightclub but is captured by Armend, an officer working for Park Planet; she wounds Armend and escapes. Coming across Armend, Andi and Frankie tend to him, then drug him unconscious. They relocate Guinevere before Armend returns and attacks the trio. In the ensuing fight, Guinevere fatally wounds Armend, taking his mechanical right arm as her own. Andi and Frankie follow Guinevere to the roof, where they realise that she is not only the original Guinevere but is also the same android they met as children. The three bring the deceased Armend to Krash, who discreetly warns Frankie he would not cover for them should Sparky find out.
3	TBA	TBA	TBA	22 January 2027
4	TBA	TBA	TBA	16 April 2027

== Production ==
Knights of Guinevere was co-created by Dana Terrace, John Bailey Owen, and Zach Marcus; all three had previously worked together on the Disney Channel animated series The Owl House, the latter two being writers on the show, and the former being the series' creator. In May 2025, Terrace described the series, on social media, as different from The Owl House, describing it as being "much more adult oriented" and having "adult themes," such as "animated blood and gore".

Knights of Guinevere was conceived in the aftermath of Terrace's departure from Disney Television Animation after The Owl House was cancelled due to its style and audience being "inconsistent with the company's brand". Glitch Productions co-founder Kevin Lerdwichagul would later contact Terrace on social media, offering her to work for the studio with enough creative freedom, which she accepted. The Michigan Daily noted that Terrace's career in Disney influenced the pilot's plot, adding that Park Planet, the fictional corporation featured in the pilot, shares some similarities with the Walt Disney Company. A dedicated 2D animation team was formed within Glitch for the series production, while animation cleanup and colouring was outsourced to Studio Maela, an Irish animation studio. In September 2025, prior to the pilot's release, Terrace discussed the show at Pixelatl Festival in Guadalajara, Mexico.

Knights of Guinevere was described by Animation Magazine as a "buzzy project, aimed at adult audiences" which makes the "studio's first 2D animated endeavor." Terrace told the publication that the series is a "passion project" and she, Owen, and Marcus created "with some of the best artists, animators, musicians and production crew we know," with Glitch Productions CEO Kevin Lerdwichagul telling the same publication that the series represents "an exciting new chapter for Glitch as we expand into 2D animation for the first time....to tell bold, emotionally resonant stories that sit in the underserved space between kids' cartoons and adult comedies". In November 2026, Terrace said she intended the series to last 26 episodes released across multiple seasons.

== Release ==
Knights of Guinevere was first revealed in the form of a teaser trailer, uploaded to Glitch Productions' YouTube channel on 17 January 2025. Commenting on the teaser, Kirsten Carey of The Mary Sue said it looked "spectacular" and was "immediately intriguing," making comparisons between Guinevere and Snow White. A second trailer was later uploaded on 29 August, with the series' pilot debuting on 19 September. On 13 February, Knights of Guinevere was announced as having been greenlit for a full series, alongside an art book of the pilot, with both a softcover and limited edition hardcover, on Glitch's online store ending at March 6.

On 22 September 2026, Animation Is Film festival in Los Angeles—taking place from 16–19 October 2026—announced that it would screen the first two episodes of Knights of Guinevere following the release of the second episode online on 9 October 2026.

== Reception ==
=== Viewership ===
The trailer for the series received over a million views within 24 hours of its release. In the two days following the release of the pilot episode, it received 8 million views. In the next three days, it had garnered over 10 million views. In the next three weeks, the pilot received an additional 4 million views, and, by February 2026, it had attained over 17 million views. The second episode, within its first day on 9 October, had reached 6 million views, while a day later 9 million views in total.

=== Critical response ===
The pilot of Knights of Guinevere was met with critical acclaim. Jon Schwarz, Chief Editor of Bubbleblabber, called it a "psychologically thrilling adventure," delivering a narrative which is gripping and spans genres, blending "a distinctive art style and emotionally resonant storytelling". Lyra Hale of Fangirlish wrote that Knights of Guinevere was "the most refreshing, unique, and engaging animated series" she had watched since The Owl House. Hale further praised the pilot's visuals, describing it as having "magic in every single frame" and "a distinct dark fantasy kind of styling ... that can be seen in everything". Dan Short of Animated Views said that while only a pilot episode has been produced, he expected more episodes would shed light on linking mysteries, and praised the pilot as "off to a captivating first start".

Jade King of TheGamer wrote that "everything about this show is dripping with atmosphere, drama, and heart", giving particular praise to the "many distinct thematic ideas" present in the pilot, "from deep critiques of capitalism to the harsh roles that women play in a futuristic dystopian society". In a related posting, King suggested that people should be celebrating an "incredibly diverse" cast. E.B. Hutchins of Comics Beat similarly highlighted the pilot's theming, describing it as "a narrative about the nature of consumerism and art, the dangers of having dreams, and difficulties of chasing them when you don't have the proper credentials", along with praising the colouring and compositing—though was somewhat critical of the animation and shot composition, which she described as "choppy". Hutchins additionally praised the elements of queerness present within the pilot, noting Frankie as a butch woman, and commenting on how the relationship between Andi and Frankie reminded her of queerplatonic relationships. In another review, Hutchins said that the pilot's world is "fascinating" with cool backgrounds, solid storytelling, with Andi reminding her of her "time in elite academia" and called Frankie "simultaneously adorable, funny and hot.

Justin Carter of Gizmodo said that the pilot is "more than some horror-tinged Disney potshots," asserting that it continues the momentum toward successful new, original animation in 2025, following KPop Demon Hunters in the summer, and compared the pilot's background details and wide shots to similar methods in The Owl House and Steven Universe, while noting that characters, apart from the protagonists, have enough depth to "make them interesting in later episodes." Carter also praised the voice acting of Michaela Laws, Eden Riegel, and Zelda Khan Black, the design of Frankie's character, and said he is "invested" in what comes next. Marc Staiano of The Cornell Daily Sun newspaper described the pilot's visuals as "absolutely stunning", calling it Glitch Productions' "strongest pilot to date" that is "off to a gorgeous start". He also noted that the pilot's plot criticized corporations and capitalist society. Ana Torresarpi of The Michigan Daily said she is "already hooked" on Knights of Guinevere and thinks it has everything to become a success.

Evan Valentine of ComicBook said that fans can view "Terrace's stellar animation work" in the pilot, noted how YouTube has been a "major springboard for some original animated series" such as Hazbin Hotel and Helluva Boss, said that the pilot is very different from The Owl House, and stated that the pilot would "most certainly ... not" find its way to the Disney Channel. Terrace said that the pilot reminded her of a "collaborative student film" because she and others were "passionately working together" on it. TheWrap said that the pilot received an "overwhelming positive response", but noted that Terrace was not sure if it would become a full series but was hopeful it would.
