= Invasive procedure =

Invasive procedure may refer to:

- "Invasive Procedures" (Star Trek: Deep Space Nine), the fourth episode of the second season of the television series Star Trek: Deep Space Nine
- Invasive Procedures (novel), a 2007 novel by Orson Scott Card and Aaron Johnston
- Minimally-invasive procedures (article discusses procedures that are non-invasive and more than minimally invasive)
