= El intruso (1999 film) =

1999 film

- Directed by: Guillermo Álvarez
- Written by: Guillermo Álvarez
- Produced by: Guillermo Álvarez
- Starring: Guillermo Álvarez; Luz Ángela Bermúdez; Germán Torres
- Cinematography: Pedro Salamanca
- Edited by: Guillermo Álvarez
- Release date: 1999
- Country: Colombia
- Language: Spanish

El intruso ("the Intruder") is a 1999 Colombian film that was produced, written, directed by, and starred Guillermo Álvarez. The plot revolves around a couple who leave town and its violence to move to a small village, and are then investigated after the discovery of the body of the woman's lover. The couple blame each other for the crime. The circumstances leave everyone confused, including the judge.

== Cast ==
- Luz Ángela Bermúdez - Lucila
- Germán Torres Rey - Rumaldo
- Guillermo Álvarez - Inspector

== Awards ==
Bogotá Film Festival (1999)

- Honorable Mention for Guillermo Álvarez
- Nominated for the Golden Precolumbian Circle Best Colombian Film
