= La Intrusa =

La Intrusa may refer to:

- La Intrusa (1939 film), an Argentine film
- La intrusa (1954 film), a Mexican film
- La intrusa (1964 TV series), a Mexican telenovela series
- La intrusa (1986 TV series), a Venezuelan telenovela series
- La intrusa (2001 TV series), a Mexican telenovela series
- La Intrusa, 1966 short story by Jorge Luis Borges

== See also ==
- A Intrusa, a 1979 film adaptation of the 1966 short story La Intrusa
