= The Intruder (2025 TV series) =

French TV drama (2025)

- Genre: Drama; Mystery; Thriller
- Created by: Nathalie Abdelnour
- Directed by: Shirley Monsarrat
- Starring: Mélanie Doutey; Lucie Fagedet; Éric Caravaca
- Composer: Owlle (France Picoulet)
- Country of origin: France
- Original language: French
- No. of series: 1
- No. of episodes: 4

Production
- Executive producers: Anne Holmes; Emmanuel Garcia; Julia Girot-Benedetti; Carole Le Berre
- Producer: Léa Gabrié
- Running time: 55 minutes (episode)
- Production companies: France Television; Tetra Media Fiction

Original release
- Network: france.tv (France; BBC Four (UK)
- Release: February 11, 2025

The Intruder, or L'Intruse, is a sub-titled French television drama series, created by Nathalie Abdelnour, directed by Léa Gabrié, and co-produced by Anne Holmes, Emmanuel Garcia, and Carole Le Berre. Recycling the 'evil nanny' genre, the series stars Mélanie Doutey and Éric Caravaca as a married couple with two teenage children who after the birth of their third child employ an au pair, Tess. The series premiered in France on 11 February 2025 and in the UK (with subtitles) on BBC Four on 11 October 2025.

== Synopsis ==
Paula, already mother of two teenage children, is coming to the end of maternity leave and returns to work. She and her husband Jérôme engage Tess, a young au pair, to help out in the household. Tess seems to be a perfect fit for the job, but Paula quickly begins to feel suspicious and have misgivings about the girl when strange things begin happening around the house.

== Cast and characters ==
- Mélanie Doutey as Paula
- Lucie Fagedet as Tess
- Éric Caravaca as Jérôme
- Léonie Simaga as Aline
- Clément Sibony as Nicolas
- Mariama Gueye as Elsa
- Alain Doutey as Alain
- Anne Loiret as Karsenti
- Louise Massin as Daphné
- Lola Naymark as Adèle Bouazid
- Hélie-Rose Dalmay as Camille
- Zaccharie Heintz as Basile

== Awards ==
L'Intruse won Best Screenplay, Best Series, and Best Direction at the 2025 Luchon TV Festival.

== Reception ==
A rare genre in French television, the thriller L'Intruse received positive reviews in France. Sarah Dempster writing in The Guardian called it 'the daftest thriller of the entire year' describing it with 'The only thing that stops you counting the cliches in this French drama about a sinister au pair is the woefully dim lighting. It’s so obvious that it barely feels worth laughing at its stupidity'. Dempster gave it two out of five stars.
