= Luz Noceda =

Fictional character from The Owl House

- The Owl House character
- First appearance: "A Lying Witch and a Warden"; The Owl House; January 10, 2020
- Last appearance: "The Owl House: The Long-Lived King"; The Owl House; September 29, 2026
- Created by: Dana Terrace
- Voiced by: Sarah-Nicole Robles

In-universe information
- Species: Human (briefly Human–Titan hybrid)
- Gender: Female
- Occupation: Witch
- Family: Camila Noceda (mother); Manny Noceda (father, deceased)
- Significant other: Amity Blight (girlfriend)
- Home: Gravesfield, Connecticut
- Nationality: American

Luz Noceda is the protagonist of the Disney Channel animated series The Owl House, created by Dana Terrace. She is voiced by Sarah-Nicole Robles. Luz was well-received by both critics and fans of the show, who praised her neurodiversity, overall character, coming-of-age arc and Robles' vocal performance.

== Character and conception ==
=== Creation ===
According to series creator Dana Terrace, Luz is named after her Dominican-American roommate and friend Luz Batista, who is a story artist and consultant for the show. Terrace also said that Luz's character evolved from conversations she had with Batista. Later, Nancy Kanter, EVP, Content and Creative Strategy of Disney Channels Worldwide explained that while they loved The Owl House's "combination of magic and mystery in this other world", they "really fell in love with the main character Luz", which they named as a major factor that led to them green-lighting the show itself. This connected with Terrace's hope that audiences are "entertained by Luz's world and her off-the-wall adventures".

=== Role and characteristics ===
Luz Noceda is a 14-year-old Afro-Dominican-American girl from the fictional town of Gravesfield, Connecticut. Luz is confirmed to be bisexual by Terrace, making her the "first bisexual lead character" on a Disney Channel show. In April 2021, the show's creator also revealed that Luz Noceda is neurodivergent, specifically that she has ADHD. However, she had never heard of the term Neurodivergent when she first started working with the character, and only realized that Luz had ADHD after doing more research on neurodiversity and talking to neurodivergent people.

In the first episode of the series, her mother sends her to a summer camp, but she accidentally ends up going to the Boiling Isles instead through a portal in a nearby house. She soon befriends an old witch named Eda and a small demon named King.

=== LGBTQ+ representation and impact ===
On July 7, 2020, Dana responded to a fan who captioned a still of Amity putting her hands on Luz's shoulder from a promotion for the upcoming episode "Enchanting Grom Fright" with "There is no heterosexual explanation for this", on Twitter, agreeing that "There really isn't". Later, on August 10, Terrace confirmed on Twitter that the episode features a bisexual character, but didn't confirm whether this was Amity, Luz, or both, but many fans assumed this referred to Luz. On September 2, during a Reddit AMA, Dana Terrace confirmed that Amity is intended to be a lesbian and that Luz is bisexual. She also stated that the relationship between Amity and Luz would be explored in Season 2 and that Luz is "oblivious to some things in front of her", including Amity's crush on her. In the same AMA, Terrace stated that Luz was Amity's first crush and that she was thrilled to see people connect to the show's characters, like Luz and Amity.

== Role in The Owl House ==
=== Season 1 ===
Luz Noceda is initially presented as a young girl with a strong love for fantasy, which often puts her at odds with the expectations of those around her. After failing her book report at school due to her outlandish presentation, her mother decides to send her to a summer camp focused on conformity. While she is waiting to be picked up for camp, she ends up in the magical world of the Boiling Isles.

She is taken in by a witch named Edalyn (Eda) Clawthorne, who she begs to teach her magic. Eda agrees to train her, despite the common understanding that humans are incapable of performing magic. Upon learning of the existence of a magical school named Hexside, she begins trying to attend despite Eda's objections. In the process, she befriends two students at the school named Willow Park and Gus Porter. She also meets Amity Blight, who she initially dislikes.

Over the course of the season, Luz learns that she can perform magic by drawing "glyphs" on paper, and develops stronger relationships with a number of other characters. She learns that Eda suffers from a mysterious curse since childhood that causes her to periodically transform into an "owl beast", and vows to help her find a cure. Her relationship with Amity also begins to improve once they realize their shared love of a fictional graphic novel series titled The Good Witch Azura. With Eda's help, Luz finally gets accepted into Hexside, and, contrary to the initial rules, is allowed to study each of the school's "tracks" after she saves the school from a Greater Basilisk. On Hexside's "Grom Night", Amity is enlisted to fight Grometheus, a monster that manifests as the fighter's deepest fears. After learning that Amity is deeply embarrassed by her greatest fear, which is later implied to have been being rejected by Luz, Luz offers to fight Grometheus in her place. Luz initially struggles to face the monster, as it manifests itself as her mother finding out about her time on the Boiling Isles and feeling hurt and angry. Luz and Amity dance together and blush while casting multiple magic spells, defeating it.

Luz attends a field trip to the Emperor's Coven and attempts to steal a magical item that she believes could cure Eda. She ends up getting discovered by Lilith, who is Eda's sister who has been attempting to capture Eda throughout the series. Lilith kidnaps Luz, knowing that Eda will risk being captured to save her. Luz ends up getting sent back home after Eda gives herself up willingly to save her and is trapped in her cursed form. Luz and King return to the Emperor's Coven to rescue Eda after learning that Emperor Belos plans for her to be executed. Lilith attempts to assist them, as she was not aware that Belos planned to kill her sister, but she along with King is captured and sent to be killed alongside Eda. Luz faces off against Belos, who offers to let Eda go if she gives him the key that unlocks the door to the human world. Luz gives him the key, but destroys it with glyphs shortly afterwards. She then rescues Eda, King, and Lilith. Lilith absorbs part of Eda's curse to return her to normal, which causes both of them to lose their magic.

=== Season 2 ===
Luz, now more adept and skilled with her glyph magic, teaches it to Eda and Lilith to allow them to use magic again. Eda, sensing Luz's guilt for recent events, tells her that her life has been better with her in it. Luz and Amity's relationship continues to improve, after the latter saved Luz from her parents, as she was trying to get her expelled friends back into Hexside. Luz learns from Eda's mother that she was not the first human on the Boiling Isles. In the library, she learns that Philip Wittebane managed to arrive to the Isles hundreds of years ago. She seeks Philip's diary, which can only be accessed with Amity's help. Their relationship improves further, with Amity expressing interest in visiting the Human Realm. After Luz makes Amity lose her library card, Amity kisses her on the cheek after she helped her regain the card back. With Philip's diary and a knowledge-replaying Echo Mouse, Luz begins studying Philip's notes. After rescuing palismen from the Coven guard, and befriending Hunter, the Emperor's Guard, she is given a log of palistrom wood by Eda to carve her own palisman staff. After the events at Amity's house, Luz is now more confident about her feelings. Hooty tries to help by placing both of them in a tunnel of love. As they traverse the river, Luz feels embarrassed by the tunnel's romantic messages, destroying them to prevent Amity from seeing them. However, Amity mistakenly believes Luz is uninterested in her and turns to leave, heartbroken. Upset, Hooty lashes out, wreaking havoc in the house, but King and Eda allow Luz and Amity to ask each other out and begin dating. Luz continues to study the contents of the Echo Mouse with the help of Amity.

Luz discovers from the Echo Mouse that Titan's Blood is needed to create a temporary portal and can be found on Eclipse Lake. Eda and King offer to get it for her, and Amity tags along, wanting to prove she is a good girlfriend for Luz. Luz worries for their well-being, and she joyfully embraces Amity when they return, happy that she is safe. With the Blood recovered, Eda and King create a temporary portal for Luz to check on her mother, Camila. She discovers that a shape-shifting Basilisk, named Vee, has been impersonating her in the Human Realm after escaping experimentation by the Emperor's Coven. Luz reveals that staying in the Boiling Isles was her own choice, but promises Camila to stay in the Human Realm once she manages another way to come back, leaving Camila devastated.

After collaborating with Amity in assisting and later defeating Kikimora with her own personal business, Amity shows Luz her phone, which she left behind at school, playing a video Luz recorded for Camila. Luz finally explains her situation to her mother, and they promise to maintain themselves together throughout the journey. Luz resolves to meet with Philip personally after learning from Eda that time-traveling puddles exist. With the help of Lilith, they travel to Philip's era through a puddle. However, they end up having to defeat Philip after he betrays them, leaving Luz guilty of having been blinded by her admiration for him. Luz agrees to help Amity in a competition, but Amity notices Luz is acting differently. Luz reveals to Amity that her father died a long time ago, and on his death anniversary, she spends the day with her mother. However, she will be unable to accompany Camila this year. They send flowers tied to a balloon into the night sky, in the hopes that they will reach the Human Realm. Luz and Hunter end up trapped inside Belos' mind. There, Luz discovers that Belos is Philip Wittebane and that her actions in the past inadvertently allowed Belos to rise to power.

Near the end of the second season, Belos enacts a draining spell in a bid to kill all witches. After the draining spell begins taking effect, Luz duels with Belos, as he expresses his desire to save her from the "delusions" caused by the Demon Realm and tries to send her back to the portal. However, Luz saves herself from being petrified by Belos and brands him with a sigil, causing Belos to be affected by the spell. Luz and her friends are sent through the portal to the Human Realm by King in an attempt to save them.

=== Season 3 ===
Luz and her friends live with Camila for a few months while trying to return to the Demon Realm. During which Luz returns to school and her friends stay home and attempt to learn how to live in the Human Realm. However, Luz still feels guilty helping Belos rise to power and has developed severe self-loathing, intending to stay in the Human Realm permanently to protect her friends. Luz and her friends return to the Boiling Isles, only to find that the Collector, a godlike entity, has taken over the Boiling Isles in their absence. Luz and her mother have a heart-to-heart that leads to Luz realizing that the one thing she wanted in life was to be understood. This triggers the hatching of her own palisman, a shapeshifting snake that she names Stringbean. Belos, having survived the sigil and the Collector's attack, possesses the Titan, whose corpse makes up the Boiling Isles. Belos corrupts the Titan, using its power to cover the Boiling Isles in mold. Luz sacrifices herself to protect the Collector from Belos and wakes up in the inbetween, where she meets the Titan's spirit. Before fully dying, the Titan gives Luz his power, allowing her to overcome Belos and separate him from the Titan's heart. Belos survives, but is stomped to death by a vengeful Eda, King, and Raine Whispers - whose body he had possessed earlier.

Due to the Titan's spirit dying, Luz's glyphs no longer function. Despite this, she spends time in the Isles working on reconstruction efforts, during which the Collector creates a new portal. On her 18th birthday, Luz packs up to attend Eda's university and is surprised by a "King-ceañera" due to missing the past three birthdays while restoring the Isles. It is here where King informs her about a new set of glyphs that he created. She is joined by her friends, family, and allies as the Collector puts on one last light show before he leaves for the stars.

== Reception ==
Luz's character was received positively. She was described by Ashby Emily as a teen who "aligns herself with a witch and a demon" to fulfil her dream to become a witch, and praised her character, with some calling her a "fantasy-loving human". Others praised the plotlines of episodes where Luz explored the magic school and met other witches of the same age, and the growing romantic relationship between Luz and Amity.

In the season 1 episode "Enchanting Grom Fright", Luz and Amity dance together for the first time. After it was confirmed that Luz was bisexual, actress Lili Reinhart, who plays Grace in Chemical Hearts, welcomed the development, saying that often people have told her that being bisexual is "a phase", and felt validated by Luz's character.

== Other media ==
Luz, along with other characters from the series, would later appear in Chibi form in the animated series based on the "Chibi Tiny Tales" shorts, Chibiverse.

Luz appears as a playable character in the mobile game Disney Heroes Battle Mode.

== See also ==
- List of The Owl House characters
