= The Intruder (1944 film) =

- Starring: Carlos Orellana
- Release date: 1944
- Country: Mexico
- Language: Spanish

The Intruder (Spanish: El intruso) is a 1944 Mexican drama film. It stars Carlos Orellana.
