= Sarah-Nicole Robles =

American actress (born 1991)

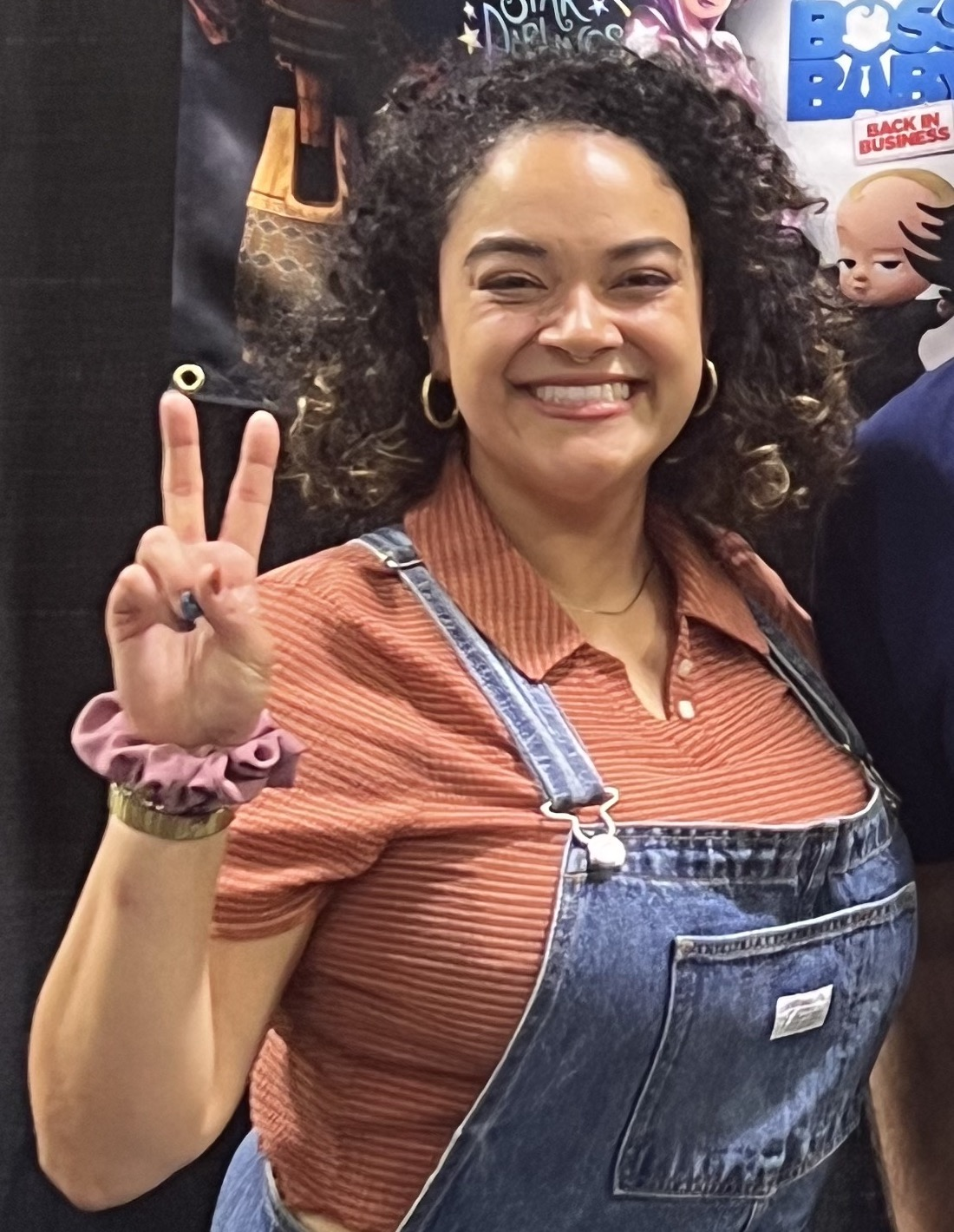
- Robles in 2023
- Born: December 20, 1991 (age 34); New Jersey, United States
- Occupation: Actress
- Years active: 2011–present

Sarah-Nicole Robles (born December 20, 1991) is an American actress. She is best known for voicing Luz Noceda in the animated television series The Owl House (2020–2023).

== Early life and education ==
Sarah-Nicole Robles was born on December 20, 1991, in New Jersey, United States. She is of Puerto Rican descent. She grew up in Paterson, New Jersey until she was 8, then moved to Fair Lawn. Robles attended the Bergen County Academies in Hackensack, where she studied the performing arts. She attended the Carnegie Mellon University in Pittsburgh, Pennsylvania, graduating with a Bachelor of Fine Arts, with a major in acting and a minor in gender studies. She also completed a training program for stage and film at Vassar Powerhouse Theatre.

== Career ==
Robles made her acting debut in a 2011 short film 17 Days by Moment Media. Soon after she started acting in commercials In 2015, she moved to Los Angeles, California. She had various television and film roles, including the voice acting.

From 2018 to 2023, she voiced Luz Noceda, the main character in the animated television series The Owl House, that aired from 2020 to 2023. For her role in The Owl House, she was nominated twice, in 2021, and 2022, for the Imagen Awards, in the Best Voice-Over Actor, in the television subcategory.

Robles also portrayed Marjorie, one of main characters of the 2025 short film Burned directed by Paula Rhodes.

She has also worked with Audible, recording for a 2024 audiobook of The Ghost Job by Greg van Eekhout.

== Personal life ==
Robles lives in Los Angeles, California, United States.

== Filmography ==
=== Films ===
| Year | Title | Role | Notes |
|---|---|---|---|
| 2011 | 17 Days | Jesica | Short film |
| 2015 | Home | —N/a | Feature film; ADR voice |
| 2015 | The Numberlys | Four | Short film; voice |
| 2017 | Shot | Girl | Feature film |
| 2017 | Moana | —N/a | Feature film; removed dialogue |
| 2017 | Olaf's Frozen Adventure | Additional voices | Short film; voice |
| 2021 | Encanto | Señora Ozma | Feature film; voice; also receiving special thanks |
| 2022 | The Final Rose | Maya | Feature film |
| 2025 | Burned | Marjorie | Short film |
| 2026 | Hexed † | Weeping Wilma | Feature film; voice |

=== Television series ===
| Year | Title | Role | Notes |
|---|---|---|---|
| 2015–2016 | Star Darlings | Scarlet | Main role, voice; 13 episodes |
| 2017 | Billy Dilley's Super-Duper Subterranean Summer | Judy | Voice; 3 episodes |
| 2018 | The Fosters | Angela | Episode: "Giving Up the Ghost" (no. 98) |
| 2018 | The Boss Baby: Back in Business | Marisol | Voice; episode: "The Boss Babysitter" |
| 2018 | NCIS: Los Angeles | Maya | Episode: "Joyride" |
| 2019 | Grey's Anatomy | Lizzie Hall | Episode: "And Dream of Sleep" |
| 2020 | Carmen Sandiego | Flytrap | Voice; 2 episodes |
| 2020 | Owl Pellets | Luz Noceda | Lead role; miniseries; voice; 4 episodes |
| 2020–2023 | The Owl House | Luz Noceda | Lead role; voice; 42 episodes |
| 2022 | Baymax! | Additional voices | Voice; 5 episodes |
| 2022 | The Resident | Maya Nuñez | 3 episodes |
| 2022–2025 | Chibiverse | Luz Noceda | Voice; 3 episodes |
| 2023 | How Not to Draw | Minnie Mouse's animator | Web series; voice; episode: "Minnie Mouse" |
| 2023 | Kung Fu Panda: The Dragon Knight | Zuma | Voice; 4 episodes |
| 2024 | Mighty MonsterWheelies | SS Rita | Voice; 3 episodes |
| 2025 | Theme Song Takeover | Luz Noceda | Web series; voice; episode: "Wizards Beyond Waverly Place Theme Song Takeover" |
| 2026 | How Not to Draw | Luz Noceda | Web series; voice; episode: "Luz Noceda" |
| 2026 | Knights of Guinevere | Patience | Web series; voice; episode: "Wolves Around the Corner" |

=== Video games ===
| Year | Title | Role | Notes |
|---|---|---|---|
| 2021 | Arcadia Fallen | Mime | Voice |
| 2023 | Trolls: Remix Rescue | Viva | Voice |

=== Audiobooks ===
| Year | Title | Author | Publisher | ISBN | Ref. |
|---|---|---|---|---|---|
| 2024 | The Ghost Job | Greg van Eekhout | HarperCollins Publishers | 9780063253339 | |
