= Dana Terrace =

American animator (born 1990)

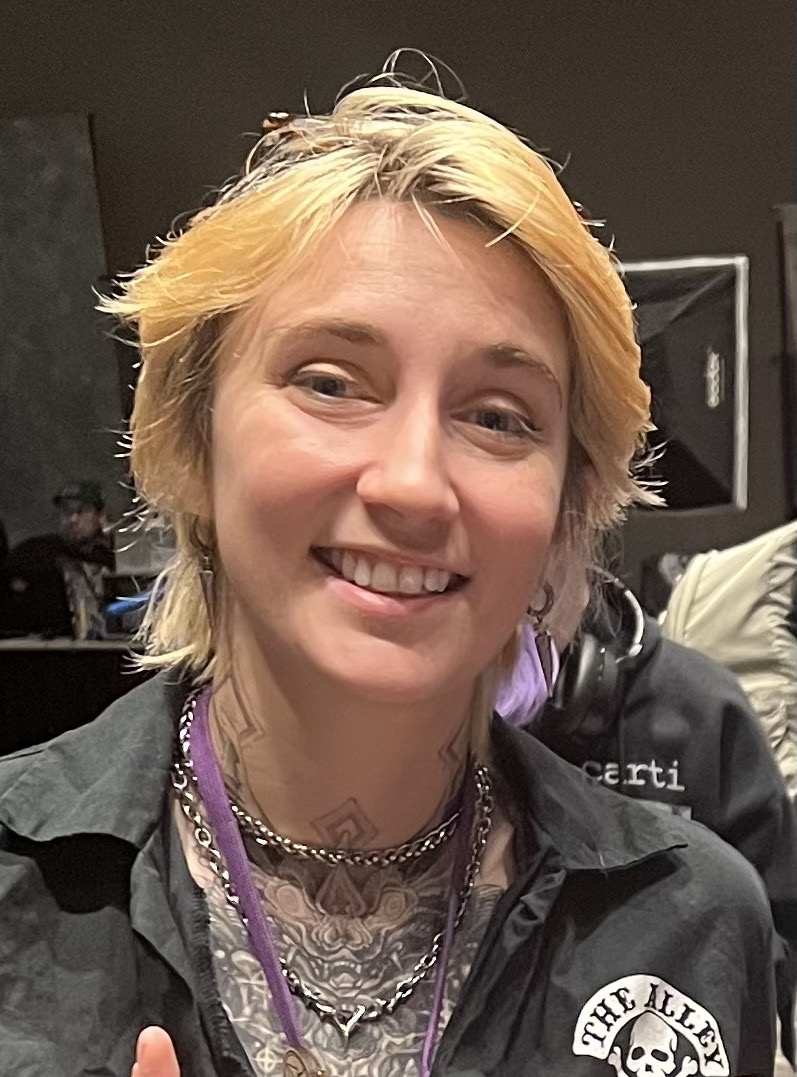
- Terrace in 2026
- Born: December 8, 1990 (age 35); Hamden, Connecticut, U.S.
- Education: School of Visual Arts (BFA)
- Occupations: Animator; writer; director; voice actress
- Years active: 2011–present
- Employer(s): Disney Television Animation (2013–2023); Glitch Productions (2024–present)
- Notable work: The Owl House; Knights of Guinevere

Dana Terrace (born December 8, 1990) is an American animator, writer, director, and voice actress. She is best known as the creator of the Disney Channel animated series The Owl House and the co-creator of the Glitch Productions animated web series Knights of Guinevere. She is also known for her work as a storyboard artist on Gravity Falls and as a director on the 2017 reboot of DuckTales.

== Early life and education ==
Terrace was born on December 8, 1990 in Hamden, Connecticut, to Dianne and Thomas Terrace. She spent eight years going to St. Rita School, a local Catholic school, gaining an interest in painters such as John Bauer, Remedios Varo, and Hieronymus Bosch. As a child, she watched cartoons like The Powerpuff Girls, Pokémon, South Park, and The Simpsons, which inspired her later works. Studio Ghibli films (especially Princess Mononoke), the anime series Revolutionary Girl Utena and Tenchi Muyo!, and Garfield influenced her as well. In 2000, she created her first flip-book animation, which focused on "Pikachu thundershocking a Charmander." Terrace was a dancer for 10 years. She attended Cooperative Arts and Humanities High School in New Haven, Connecticut. While in high school, she worked at a natural history museum for three years.

Terrace studied animation at the School of Visual Arts in New York. While there she drew for about eight hours a day, and began posting work to her Tumblr blog. In April 2012, during her third year at SVA, she created an animated short titled Kickball, with voiceovers by YouTube animator Yotam Perel and music by Jeff Liu. Kickball was praised for its design and "expressive motion" and won a grant from the National Board of Review. The following year, she worked with Iker Maidagan on another animated short titled Mirage. Maidagan did the layout and wrote the story, while Terrace animated and designed the characters. The film was praised as being "flawlessly executed," was shown at the LA Shorts Fest, and resulted in Terrace and Maidagan receiving an Alumni Scholarship Award. At the time, when asked about animating, she said she loved it, and said she is on the track to become a "proper filmmaker" and stated that she would collaborate with Maidagan in the future. She later described her experience at SVA as a mixed bag, although she learned a lot from online tutorials, her peers, and fellow students.

== Career ==
=== Career beginnings ===
In 2011, Terrace was an assistant for a thesis horror comedy film by Zach Bellissimo titled Blanderstein, as was Terrace's roommate Luz Batista. Blanderstein went on to win a Dusty Award for "Outstanding Traditional Animation and Achievement in Traditional Animation Character Design," tying with Michael Ruocco's thesis film, Destiny is for the Birds.

After graduating from SVA in 2013, she interned the following summer at JibJab, where she met an individual from Gravity Falls who saw her student film Mirage and sent her a storyboard test, subsequently hiring her for Disney Television Animation and landing her a job on the series as a storyboard revisionist. As she described it in 2017, she was brought into Gravity Falls because creative people working on the show liked what they saw on her Tumblr blog, and she was brought in because she was willing to do any kind of animation for a specific scene. Her work for Gravity Falls would be her "first professional animation job," where she learned to storyboard, how to handle a crew, and have a clear vision. Terrace also animated sequences for the show that were animated in-house due to being considered too important to be animated by outside studios. In 2019, she said she had a "wonderful experience" on Gravity Falls and said she "couldn't have asked for a better first gig." She stated in a 2016 interview that she was waiting to hear back from Steven Universe because she was a fan of Rebecca Sugar after seeing her films at SVA, but they "took too long to reply" so she decided to work for Gravity Falls instead.

In 2014, she tabled at the CTN Animation Expo with Nate Swineheart, and sold prints, sketchbooks, and other works.

Dana appeared twice at Mexico's Pixelatl Festival. First in Cuernavaca and later in Guadalajara. She participated in panels, keynotes, networking sessions and various other activities.

=== The Owl House ===
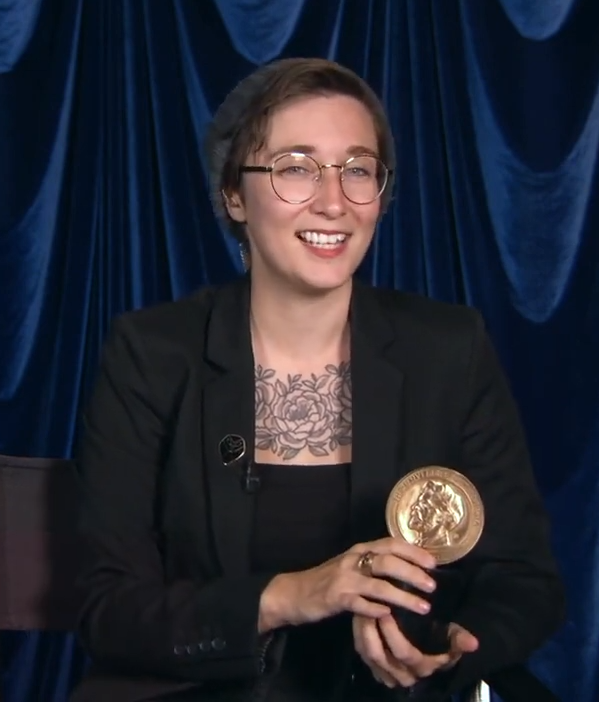
Terrace accepting a Peabody Awards for The Owl House in 2021

After years of working on other Disney Channel shows, Terrace developed the characters and "baseline idea" for an original series at the end of 2016 and pitched the series a few months after she started directing DuckTales in 2017. The pitch, "a young girl goes to another world and learns magic from an older witch", later developed into The Owl House. The first character she created was the Owl Lady, which she based on the women in her family, including her aunts, mother, and grandmother. The character Luz Noceda is named after her roommate. The series was also influenced by Pokémon Red, a game Terrace's father, Thomas Terrace, an attorney in Hamden, Connecticut, gave her before he died when she was age 11. Terrace said she was motivated to create The Owl House to prove it was a good story, and gave it the current name because of the "mystique surrounding owls." She later said that while there is some information for fans who want to "dig deeper" into the show, like codes and ciphers in Gravity Falls, there is a way to "enjoy the show as it is" without digging into the show's lore.

The Owl House began development on February 23, 2018, when it was greenlit alongside Amphibia, and premiered on January 10, 2020, on Disney Channel in the United States. The series was approved for a second season on November 21, 2019.

The Owl House has been praised for its depiction of an LGBTQ+ relationship between the characters of Luz Noceda and Amity Blight, for which Terrace is responsible. During its second season, the series was also lauded for the inclusion of a non-binary transgender character, in the form of Raine Whispers. She actively uses Twitter to confirm the LGBTQ+ identities of characters. Though Disney was initially resistant to the portrayal of a queer relationship on the show, Terrace eventually gained their support, crediting the change of mind to her "stubbornness". Although such portrayals garnered support from viewers and critics, Terrace noted that when the series was greenlit, certain Disney executives told her she could "NOT represent any form of bi or gay relationship on the [Disney] Channel" but that other executives later helped ensure this representation was within the show.

Terrace told Vanity Fair in March 2021 that she was open about plans for Luz to be bisexual and include LGBT+ characters during the development of the show. She was later told that she could not "have any kind of gay storyline among the main characters." Terrace said that, in response, "I let myself get mad, to absolutely blow up, and storm out of the room. Life is short and I don't have time for cowardice, I was ready to move on to greener pastures if need be." A "week or two" later, she was "given the all-clear" and describes the studio as supportive since then.

On February 12, 2026, Terrace announced that Mikki Cristostomo and she are writing a graphic novel called The Owl House: The Long-Lived King. It was released on September 29, 2026.

=== Knights of Guinevere ===
In March 2023, Terrace announced on her Instagram that she had left Disney. Afterwards, co-founder of Glitch Productions Kevin Lerdwichagul contacted Terrace on social media, offering her to work for the studio, saying: "Do you want to make whatever you want?", to which she accepted. On January 17, 2025, it was announced that Terrace had co-created a series for Glitch Productions, titled Knights of Guinevere, alongside The Owl House writers John Bailey Owen and Zach Marcus. Glitch Productions also described the series as a "sci-fi psychological thriller" and the company's first-ever 2D animated production. The Michigan Daily said that her career in Disney influenced the pilot's plot, it noted that Park Planet (a fictional corporation in the pilot) shared some similarities with The Walt Disney Company. The pilot was described by Terrace, on social media, as different from The Owl House, describing it as being "much more adult oriented" and having "adult themes," such as "animated blood and gore".

The pilot premiered on September 19, 2025, with Terrace telling Animation Magazine that the series is a "passion project" and she, Zach and John created "with some of the best artists, animators, musicians and production crew we know." In the first two days following its release on September 19, the series' pilot episode received eight million views and Evan Valentine of ComicBook reported that in the five days after its release, it had garnered over ten million views. Terrace said that the pilot reminded her of a "collaborative student film" because she and others were "passionately working together" on it, with TheWrap saying that the pilot received an "overwhelming positive response."

On February 13, 2026, Glitch Productions announced Knights of Guinevere had been greenlit for a full season.

=== Other work ===
In 2017, Terrace directed various episodes of the 2017 DuckTales reboot and made the character Webby Vanderquack "more dynamic." The line producer for the second season of Gravity Falls was also working on DuckTales and brought her into the show in spite of Terrace having never watched the original series before working on the show, though she is a fan of the Carl Barks/Don Rosa comic books both series draw inspiration from. The same year, Variety highlighted her as an up-and-coming animator. Also that year she worked as a storyboard revisionist for Tangled: Before Ever After, directed by Tom Caulfield and Stephen Sandoval; Sandoval would later work on The Owl House. She later storyboarded the fourth episode of Rapunzel's Tangled Adventure, "Challenge of the Brave."

In 2018, she inked 34 pages of Hirsch's graphic novel, Gravity Falls: Lost Legends: 4 All-New Adventures!

In 2019, Terrace illustrated an alternative cover for issue 4 of Adventure Time with Fionna and Cake: Card Wars, a BOOM! Studios six-issue miniseries which featured Fionna and Cake, the gender-swapped versions of Finn and Jake. Terrace also provided guest animation for the episode of Adventure Time titled "Bad Timing". In 2020, Terrace criticized the cancellation of The Venture Bros. by Adult Swim, writing "this timeline sucks."

In 2021, the director of The Mitchells vs. the Machines, Mike Rianda, revealed that Terrace was a storyboard artist for the film. The same year, Terrace provided rough animation for The Owl House season 2 episodes "Keeping Up A-fear-ances", "Hunting Palismen", and "Eclipse Lake".

From February 2, 2025, to March 9, 2025, Terrace had a solo art exhibit in Alhambra, California which displayed a wide array of her artwork since 2015, in order to celebrate the release of an art book entitled skin & bones and related merchandise.

== Personal life ==
From 2015 to sometime before April 2022, Terrace was in a relationship with Gravity Falls creator Alex Hirsch.

Terrace came out as bisexual in 2017, and drew on her experiences to create The Owl House and the bisexual character Luz Noceda. Terrace has mentioned multiple times that she draws inspiration for Luz Noceda from herself. In 2025 she stated that the bisexual label no longer feels accurate to her, and she is comfortable being referred to as just queer.

In 2018, Terrace signed a petition supporting pay equity in the animation industry. In 2022, she joined other animators at Disney who criticized Bob Chapek's refusal to make a comment on HB 1557, which is often referred to as the "Don't Say Gay" bill. She also argued that Chapek's letter to employees was "flowery and compassionate words to shut you up."

In November 2024, Terrace responded to the reported shelving of an episode of Moon Girl and Devil Dinosaur, focusing on a transgender character, by Disney, saying that the company is "terrified of everything" and adding that Disney should "grow some fuckin guts."

In November 2025, after Disney announced a feature allowing subscribers to "create their own AI-generated content within the app," Terrace encouraged fans of The Owl House to unsubscribe from Disney+ and pirate the series. She called Bob Iger and other executives "fucking ghouls", and expressed her hatred of generative AI, its environmental impacts, and its supporters, saying that regular people create "movies and art" every day without those tools, using "pens, pencils, and styluses" instead.

== Filmography ==
=== Film ===
Title	Year	Credited as					Notes
Title	Year	Director	Writer	Producer	Animation/Art	Other	Notes
Blanderstein	2011	No	No	No	No	Yes	Assistant
Nym	2012	No	No	No	No	Yes	Given "special thanks" in the credits
Kickball	2012	Yes	Yes	Yes	Yes	No	
Harvest Season	2013	No	No	No	No	Yes	Given "special thanks" in the credits
Mirage	2014	Co-director	No	Co-producer	Yes	No	Character designer and animator
Tangled: Before Ever After	2017	No	No	No	Yes	No	Storyboard revisionist Television film
The Mitchells vs. the Machines	2021	No	No	No	Yes	No	Storyboard artist (Note: Uncredited)

=== Television ===
Title	Year	Credited as						Role	Notes
Title	Year	Creator	Writer	Executive producer	Director	Animation/Art	Others	Role	Notes
Gravity Falls	2014–2016	No	No	No	No	Yes	No	—N/a	Storyboard revisionist (2014)
Gravity Falls	2014–2016	No	No	No	No	Yes	No	—N/a	Storyboard artist (2015–2016)
Gravity Falls	2014–2016	No	No	No	No	Yes	No	—N/a	In-house animator
Rapunzel's Tangled Adventure	2017	No	No	No	No	Yes	No	—N/a	Storyboarder on "Challenge of the Brave"
DuckTales	2017–2018	No	No	No	Yes	Yes	No	—N/a	Directed six episodes. (Note: Specifically "Woo-oo!", "Daytrip of Doom!", "The Beagle Birthday Massacre!", "The Living Mummies of Toth-Ra!", "The Spear of Selene!", "Day of the Only Child!")
DuckTales	2017–2018	No	No	No	Yes	Yes	No	—N/a	Additional animator (Note: "Woo-oo!" only)
The Owl House	2020–2023	Yes (Note: Also creator of animated comedic shorts titled Owl Pellets.)	Yes	Yes	No	Yes	No	Tinella Nosa, King, (Note: "Squeak of Rage" in "Escape of the Palisman", as well as the younger version of him in "Echoes of the Past") Severine, (Note: In the episode "Labyrinth Runners") Additional Voices	In-house rough animator (Note: Episodes "Keeping Up A-fear-ances", "Hunting Palismen", and "Eclipse Lake" only)
Amphibia	2022	No	No	No	No	No	Yes	—N/a	Special thanks on "The Hardest Thing"

=== Web series ===
Title	Year	Credited as						Role	Notes
Title	Year	Creator	Writer	Executive producer	Director	Animation/Art	Others	Role	Notes
The Gaslight District	2025	No	No	No	No	No	Yes	—N/a	Given "special thanks" in the credits
Knights of Guinevere	2025–present	Yes	Yes	Yes	Yes	Yes	Yes	—N/a	
Gameoverse	2026	No	No	No	No	No	Yes	—N/a	Given "special thanks" in the credits

== Nominations and awards ==
Year	Award	Category	Nominee(s)	Result	Ref.
2018	Daytime Emmy Award	Outstanding Special Class Animated Program	DuckTales (for "Woo-oo!")	Nominated	
2021	GLAAD Media Award	GLAAD Media Award for Outstanding Kids and Family Programming	The Owl House	Nominated	
2021	Peabody Awards	Children's & Youth Programming	The Owl House	Won	
2021	Daytime Emmys	Outstanding Main Title for a Daytime Animated Program	The Owl House	Nominated	
2022	GLAAD Media Award	GLAAD Media Award for Outstanding Kids and Family Programming	The Owl House	Nominated	
2023	GLAAD Media Award	GLAAD Media Award for Outstanding Kids and Family Programming	The Owl House	Nominated	
