= 2020 in animation =

2020 in animation is an overview of notable events, including notable awards, list of films released, television show debuts and endings, and notable deaths.

== Events ==
=== January ===
- January 10:
  - The League of 5 from Ánima Estudios became the first animated film to be released in the 2020s.
  - The first episode of The Owl House premiered on Disney Channel.
- January 11: Particular Crowd's Spycies premiered in Chinese theaters.
- January 12: Bless the Harts concludes its first season on Fox with the episode "Tying the Not". The season's finale was seen by over 2.6 million viewers that night.
- January 14: Kipo and the Age of Wonderbeasts is released on Netflix.
- January 17: Voice actor Hank Azaria announces he will no longer be voicing Apu Nahasapeemapetilon on The Simpsons, unless, as stated by him, the show's producers find "some way to transition it or something."
- January 25: 47th Annie Awards.
- January 31: The second half of the final season of BoJack Horseman is released on Netflix.

=== February ===
- February 7: The second season of Dragons: Rescue Riders premiered on Netflix. It was later picked up by Peacock for four additional seasons and ended its run in September 2022.
- February 9: 92nd Academy Awards:
  - Toy Story 4, directed by Josh Cooley, Jonas Rivera, and Mark Nielsen, and produced by Pixar and the Walt Disney Company, wins the Academy Award for Best Animated Feature.
  - Hair Love by Matthew A. Cherry and Karen Rupert Toliver wins the Academy Award for Best Animated Short Film.
- February 14: The live-action/animated film adaptation of Sega's Sonic the Hedgehog, from Paramount Pictures, is released.
- February 16: The first episode of Duncanville, simply titled "Pilot", premiered on Fox. The show's premiere was seen by over 1.5 million viewers that night.
- February 21: Glitch Techs premiered on Netflix.
- February 22:
  - The final episodes of 101 Dalmatian Street are broadcast.
  - Paw Patrol concludes its sixth season on TVO in Canada with the episodes "Pups Save a Tour Bus/Pups Save Midnight at the Museum".
- February 27: The music video for "Magnum Bullets" by Night Runner, featuring Dan Avidan, was released on the Game Grumps' YouTube channel.

=== March ===
- March 6: Disney/Pixar's Onward premieres. The film was banned from being screened in several areas of the Arab world for its inclusion of a lesbian character.
- March 27:
  - Season 7 of Paw Patrol begins on Nickelodeon in the US with the premiere of the episodes "Mighty Pups, Charged Up: Pups Stop a Humdinger Horde/Mighty Pups, Charged Up: Pups Save a Mighty Lighthouse".
  - The final episode of Steven Universe Future premieres on Cartoon Network, serving as the finale to the Steven Universe franchise.

=== April ===
- April 4: Teen Titans Go! concludes its fifth season on Cartoon Network with the episode "Teen Titans Roar!", which is a crossover with the series ThunderCats Roar.
- April 13: Season 17 of American Dad! begins on TBS (while still being in its 16th season) with the premiere of the episode "100 Years a Solid Fool". The season's premiere was watched by only 694 thousand viewers that night, marking another low in the show's viewership.
- April 27: American Dad! concludes its 16th season on TBS with the episode "Cheek to Cheek: A Stripper's Story". The season's finale was watched by only 670 thousand viewers that night, marking another low in the show's viewership.

=== May ===
- May 2: Season 7 of Paw Patrol begins on TVO in Canada with the premiere of the episodes "Mighty Pups, Charged Up: Pups Stop a Humdinger Horde/Mighty Pups, Charged Up: Pups Save a Mighty Lighthouse".
- May 15: The fifth and final season of She-Ra and the Princesses of Power is released on Netflix.
- May 17:
  - The Simpsons concludes its 31st season on Fox with the episode "The Way of the Dog", featuring guest stars Cate Blanchett & Michael York. The season's finale was seen by just nearly 1.9 million viewers that night.
  - Duncanville concludes its first season on Fox with the episode "Classless President". The season's finale was seen by just over 1.2 million viewers that night.
  - Bob's Burgers concludes its tenth season on Fox with the episode "Prank You for Being a Friend". The season's finale was seen by over 1.2 million viewers that night.
  - Family Guy concludes its 18th season on Fox with the episode "Movin' In (Principal Shepherd's Song)". The season's finale was seen by just over 1.5 million viewers that night.
- May 27: Looney Tunes Cartoons premieres on HBO Max as a tie-in to the app's launch.

=== June ===
- June 8: Several programs, including animated ones, are pulled from television rotations following the wake of the George Floyd protests. Several programs, including episodes of PAW Patrol and Bluey, are pulled after regarding the presence of racial stereotypes and police corruption.
- June 11: Craig of the Creek concludes its second season on Cartoon Network with the episodes "Beyond the Rapids" and "The Jinxening", the season's finale was seen by a combined total of 646 thousand viewers that night.
- June 12: Season 4 of F Is for Family premiered on Netflix.
- June 21: Season 3 of Craig of the Creek begins on Cartoon Network with the premiere of the half-hour Father's Day special "The Other Side: The Tournament", the season's premiere was seen by a total of 234 thousand viewers that night.
- June 25: As a result of the George Floyd protests:
  - Kristen Bell announces she will no longer voice the multiracial character Molly on Central Park.
  - Jenny Slate announces she will no longer voice African-American character Missy Foreman-Greenwald on Big Mouth.
- June 27: As a result of the George Floyd protests:
  - It is announced that all non-white characters in The Simpsons will no longer be voiced by white voice actors, as the entertainment industry and others take action in response to rekindled calls for racial equality.
  - Mike Henry announces he will no longer voice African-American character Cleveland Brown from Family Guy, due to feeling that an actual African-American actor would be more qualified to do so.
  - Actress Alison Brie expresses public regret for having voiced Asian character Diane Nguyen in BoJack Horseman.

=== July ===
- July 11: The second season of Amphibia premiered on the Disney Channel.
- July 15: Deer Squad was released on iQIYI in China.
- July 20: The animated short The Wonderful Wingits was released on Cartoon Network's YouTube channel.
- July 21: The animated short Trick Moon was released on Cartoon Network's YouTube channel.
- July 23: The Loud House concludes its fourth season on Nickelodeon with the episode "Coupe Dreams". The season's finale was watched by only 624 thousand viewers that afternoon.

=== August ===
- August 7: A24 Films LLC picks up the Hazbin Hotel pilot for its own full-length series.
- August 8:
  - The Owl House episode "Enchanting Grom Fright" premieres on Disney Channel to universal critical acclaim as well as praise for having Disney's first LGBTQ protagonist.
  - The Amphibia episode "Wax Museum" premieres on Disney Channel to positive reviews, featuring easter eggs from Gravity Falls. Additionally, the latter's series creator, Alex Hirsch, guest stars in this episode.
- August 10:
  - The second series of Bluey premieres to universal critical acclaim.
  - Bluey began streaming internationally on Disney+ to universal critical acclaim from American critics and audiences.
- August 14: The SpongeBob Movie: Sponge on the Run initially premiered in theaters in Canada.
- August 17: The second and final season of Glitch Techs premiered on Netflix.
- August 21: Elena of Avalor airs its final episode.
- August 27:
  - Unikitty! airs its final episode on Cartoon Network.
  - Glitch Productions launches their YouTube channel simply named "GLITCH".
- August 28: Phineas and Ferb the Movie: Candace Against the Universe is released on Disney+.
- August 29: The first-season finale of The Owl House titled "Young Blood, Old Souls" is broadcast.
- August 30: The 2020 reboot of Animaniacs announced its release date to be November 20, 2020. A behind-the-scenes video of Rob Paulsen, Tress MacNeille, Jess Harnell, and Maurice LaMarche was released on YouTube to celebrate the news.

=== September ===
- September 7: Elinor Wonders Why premieres on PBS Kids to generally positive reviews.
- September 5: We Bare Bears: The Movie premieres on Cartoon Network; this also serves as a series finale.
- September 9: Nickelodeon pulls the premiere of 'Made by Maddie' due to controversy over its similarities with Hair Love.
- September 10: The Idhun Chronicles premiered on Netflix.
- September 11: Season 5 of The Loud House begins on Nickelodeon with the premiere of the half-hour special "Schooled!". The season's premiere was watched by only 790 thousand viewers that night.
- September 14: The 300th episode of American Dad! is broadcast.
- September 24: Alex Désert replaces Hank Azaria as the voice of The Simpsons character Carl Carlson, starting with the episode "Undercover Burns."
- September 25: YouTube star Arif Zahir replaces Mike Henry as the voice of Cleveland Brown in Family Guy.
- September 27:
  - Season 32 of The Simpsons begins on Fox with the premiere of the episode "Undercover Burns", featuring the guest stars David Harbour and Philip Rosenthal. The season's premiere was seen by over 4.4 million viewers that night.
  - Season 2 of Bless the Harts begins on Fox with the premiere of the episode "Violet's Secret". The season's premiere was seen by over 2 million viewers that night.
  - Season 11 of Bob's Burgers begins on Fox with the premiere of the episode "Dream a Little Bob of Bob". The season's premiere was seen by over 1.7 million viewers that night.
  - Season 19 of Family Guy begins on Fox with the premiere of the episode "Stewie's First Word". The season's premiere was seen by over 1.8 million viewers that night.
- September 30:
  - Vivienne Medrano's animated short film "Bad Luck Jack," which is based on her ZooPhobia webcomics, was released on YouTube.
  - Season 24 of South Park begins on Comedy Central with the hour-long special titled "The Pandemic Special", which satirizes the COVID-19 pandemic and other current events in 2020. It is also broadcast on MTV and MTV2.

=== October ===
- October 1: Tomer Eshed's Dragon Rider was released in German theaters, which was followed by its Netflix debut in September 2021 as "Firedrake the Silver Dragon."
- October 2: Rainbow High premieres its first episode.
- October 5: The Teen Titans Go! Halloween special "Ghost With the Most" premieres on Cartoon Network, it is a crossover with the 1988 film Beetlejuice (with the titular character being voiced by his Broadway musical actor Alex Brightman in this episode).
- October 6: The Scooby-Doo direct-to-video Halloween film Happy Halloween, Scooby-Doo! releases on DVD and Digital services.
- October 9: Santiago of the Seas premiered on Nickelodeon.
- October 10: The Ben 10 movie, Ben 10 vs. The Universe: The Movie, premieres on Cartoon Network.
- October 12:
  - The third and final season of Kipo and the Age of Wonderbeasts is released on Netflix.
  - Disney Channel greenlights Hamster & Gretel, a brand new series by Phineas and Ferb & Milo Murphy's Law co-creator, Dan Povenmire.
- October 16:
  - Season 2 of Meta Runner premiered on YouTube and has moved from the SMG4 channel over to Glitch Productions' own YouTube channel, GLITCH. The episode that premiered is titled "Hard Reset".
  - Demon Slayer: Kimetsu no Yaiba – The Movie: Mugen Train was released in Japanese cinemas by Aniplex and Toho.
- October 17: Pearl Studio's Over the Moon made its world premiere at the Montclair Film Festival in California ahead of its simultaneous October 23 debut in theaters and on Netflix.
- October 19: Apple TV+ will be the new home for Peanuts specials instead of airing them on television.
- October 23: The Frozen short, Once Upon a Snowman, premiered on Disney+, which follows Olaf's origin story during the first film.
- October 30: The entire first season of The Owl House released on Disney+, just 2 months after the season concluded.
- October 31: The first official episode of Vivienne Medrano's independent web series Helluva Boss, titled "Murder Family", was released on YouTube.

=== November ===
- November 5: The SpongeBob Movie: Sponge on the Run releases on Netflix internationally, except for the U.S., Canada, and China.
- November 7: The first episode of Pikwik Pack is broadcast on Disney Junior.
- November 14: The Teen Titans Go! episode "Huggbees" premieres on Cartoon Network, it is a crossover with the 90's Warner Bros. animated series Freakazoid!. The following actors from the show reprise their roles in this crossover: Paul Rugg as the titular character, David Warner as The Lobe, Ed Asner as Sgt. Mike Cosgrove, and Joe Leahy as himself.
- November 15: The Simpsons episode "Podcast News" premieres, guest-starring actors Morgan Fairchild, Christine Nangle, and Stellan Skarsgård. This is the first episode that David X. Cohen wrote since he left the show in 1998.
- November 17: The Lego Star Wars Holiday Special premiered on Disney+.
- November 20: The first season of the Animaniacs reboot was released on Hulu to generally positive reviews.

=== December ===
- December 4: Season 4 of Big Mouth premiered on Netflix.
- December 5: Alan Becker releases "Animator vs. Animation V" on YouTube.
- December 9: The second episode of Helluva Boss, titled "Loo Loo Land," was released on YouTube.
- December 11: Wolfwalkers premieres on Apple TV+.
- December 12: After more than 20 years on the air, PBS airs Caillou for the last time on the PBS Kids block.
- December 13: The penultimate episode of the second series of Bluey, "Baby Race," premieres to universal acclaim, with critics praising the message about parenting and motherhood.
- December 14:
  - Hilda releases its second season on Netflix to critical acclaim. A third season is in production, while the 85-minute movie special, Hilda and The Mountain King, premiered on December 30, 2021, serving as a continuation of the season 2 finale.
  - Shrek is added to the National Film Registry.
- December 18: The Meta Runner Season two finale "Fatal Error" premiered on YouTube on the GLITCH channel.
- December 19: The Teen Titans Go! episode "Superhero Feud" premieres on Cartoon Network, it is the first crossover with the other DC-Warner Bros. animated series DC Super Hero Girls.
- December 21: American Dad! concludes its 17th season on TBS with the premiere of its 300th episode "Yule. Tide. Repeat." The season's finale was watched by only 550 thousand viewers that night, marking another low in the show's viewership.
- December 25: Pixar's Soul premieres on Disney+.

== Awards ==
- Academy Award for Best Animated Feature: Toy Story 4
- Academy Award for Best Animated Short Film: Hair Love
- American Cinema Editors Award for Best Edited Animated Feature Film: Toy Story 4
- Annecy International Animated Film Festival Cristal du long métrage: I Lost My Body
- Annie Award for Best Animated Feature: Klaus
- Annie Award for Best Animated Feature — Independent: I Lost My Body
- Asia Pacific Screen Award for Best Animated Feature Film: Weathering with You
- BAFTA Award for Best Animated Film: Klaus
- Boston Society of Film Critics Award for Best Animated Film: I Lost My Body
- César Award for Best Animated Film: Dilili in Paris
- Chicago Film Critics Association Award for Best Animated Film: Toy Story 4
- Critics' Choice Movie Award for Best Animated Feature: Toy Story 4
- Critics' Choice Television Award for Best Animated Series: BoJack Horseman
- Dallas–Fort Worth Film Critics Association Award for Best Animated Film: Toy Story 4
- European Film Award for Best Animated Feature Film: Buñuel in the Labyrinth of the Turtles
- Florida Film Critics Circle Award for Best Animated Film: I Lost My Body
- Golden Globe Award for Best Animated Feature Film: Missing Link
- Golden Reel Awards: Toy Story 4
- Goya Award for Best Animated Film: Buñuel in the Labyrinth of the Turtles
- Japan Academy Film Prize for Animation of the Year: Weathering with You
- Kids' Choice Award for Favorite Animated Movie: Frozen II
- Los Angeles Film Critics Association Award for Best Animated Film: I Lost My Body
- Mainichi Film Award for Best Animation Film: Children of the Sea
- National Board of Review Award for Best Animated Film: How to Train Your Dragon: The Hidden World
- New York Film Critics Circle Award for Best Animated Film: I Lost My Body
- Online Film Critics Society Award for Best Animated Film: Toy Story 4
- Producers Guild of America Award for Best Animated Motion Picture: Toy Story 4
- San Diego Film Critics Society Award for Best Animated Film: I Lost My Body
- San Francisco Film Critics Circle Award for Best Animated Feature: I Lost My Body
- Saturn Award for Best Animated Film: Spider-Man: Into the Spider-Verse
- Seattle Film Critics Society Award for Best Animated Feature: Toy Story 4
- St. Louis Gateway Film Critics Association Award for Best Animated Film: Toy Story 4
- Tokyo Anime Award: Weathering with You
- Toronto Film Critics Association Award for Best Animated Film: Missing Link
- Visual Effects Society Award for Outstanding Visual Effects in an Animated Feature: Missing Link
- Washington D.C. Area Film Critics Association Award for Best Animated Feature: Toy Story 4

== Television series debuts ==
Date	Title	Channel	Year
January 4	Go! Go! Cory Carson	Netflix	2020–2021
January 5	Keep Your Hands Off Eizouken!	NHK General TV, Crunchyroll	2020
January 6	Deathstroke: Knights & Dragons	CW Seed	2020
January 10	The Owl House	Disney Channel	2020–2023
January 13	Dorohedoro	Tokyo MX, Netflix	2020–present
January 14	Kipo and the Age of Wonderbeasts	Netflix	2020
January 18	It's Pony	Nickelodeon	2020–2022
January 19	Powerbirds	Universal Kids	2020
February 16	Duncanville	Fox, Hulu	2020–2022
February 21	Glitch Techs	Netflix	2020
February 21	Star Wars: The Clone Wars	Disney+	2020
February 22	ThunderCats Roar	Cartoon Network	2020
February 28	101 Dalmatian Street	Disney+	2020
March 20	Mira, Royal Detective	Disney Junior	2020–2022
March 20	Buddi	Netflix	2020
April 3	StarBeam	Netflix	2020–2021
April 3	Spirit Riding Free: Riding Academy	Netflix	2020
April 6	Ollie's Pack	Nickelodeon	2020–2021
April 7	Tooning Out the News	CBS All Access	2020–present
April 15	Cleopatra in Space	Peacock	2020–2021
April 20	The Midnight Gospel	Netflix	2020
May 1	Remy & Boo	Universal Kids	2020
May 8	Solar Opposites	Hulu	2020–present
May 8	Chico Bon Bon: Monkey with a Tool Belt	Netflix	2020
May 10	JJ Villard's Fairy Tales	Adult Swim	2020
May 27	Looney Tunes Cartoons	HBO Max	2020–2023
May 27	The Not-Too-Late Show with Elmo	HBO Max	2020–2021
May 29	Central Park	Apple TV+	2020–2022
June 1	Hero Elementary	PBS Kids	2020–2022
June 2	Great Pretender	Netflix	2020–2024
June 12	Crossing Swords	Hulu	2020–2021
June 12	Pokémon Journeys: The Series	Netflix	2020–2021
June 19	Rhyme Time Town	Netflix	2020–2021
June 25	Adventure Time: Distant Lands	HBO Max	2020–2021
July 9	Close Enough	HBO Max	2020–2022
July 23	Tig n' Seek	HBO Max	2020–2022
July 30	Transformers: War for Cybertron Trilogy	Netflix	2020–2021
August 7	Wizards: Tales of Arcadia	Netflix	2020
August 7	Word Party Songs	Netflix	2020
August 20	The Fungies!	HBO Max	2020–2021
August 21	Hoops	Netflix	2020
September 7	Elinor Wonders Why	PBS Kids	2020–present
September 7	Madagascar: A Little Wild	Hulu, Peacock	2020–2022
September 18	Jurassic World Camp Cretaceous	Netflix	2020–2022
September 22	Mighty Express	Netflix	2020–2022
September 26	Magical Girl Friendship Squad	Syfy	2020
September 27	Wild Life	Syfy	2020
October 3	Jujutsu Kaisen	MBS, TBS, Crunchyroll	2020–present
October 8	Akudama Drive	BS NTV, Sun TV, Tokyo MX, KBS, AT-X, Crunchyroll	2020
October 9	Santiago of the Seas	Nickelodeon	2020–present
October 27	Blood of Zeus	Netflix	2020–2025
November 7	My Little Pony: Pony Life	Discovery Family	2020–2021
November 7	Pikwik Pack	Disney Junior	2020–2021
November 9	The Mighty Ones	Hulu, Peacock	2020–2022
November 10	Trash Truck	Netflix	2020–2021
November 11	The Liberator	Netflix	2020
November 13	Doug Unplugs	Apple TV+	2020–2022
November 18	The Wonderful World of Mickey Mouse	Disney+	2020–2023
November 19	Trolls: TrollsTopia	Hulu, Peacock	2020–2022
November 20	Animaniacs	Hulu	2020–2023
November 21	Onyx Equinox	Crunchyroll	2020
December 4	Stillwater	Apple TV+	2020–2025
December 11	Baby Shark's Big Show!	Nickelodeon	2020–2025

== Television series endings ==
Date	Title	Channel	Year	Notes
January 6	Deathstroke: Knights & Dragons	CW Seed	2020	Cancelled
January 10	Harvey Girls Forever!	Netflix	2018–2020	Ended
January 26	Star Wars Resistance	Disney Channel	2018–2020	Ended
January 30	New Looney Tunes	Cartoon Network, Boomerang	2015–2020	Cancelled
January 31	BoJack Horseman	Netflix	2014–2020	Ended
February 16	Mike Tyson Mysteries	Adult Swim	2014–2020	Cancelled
February 28	101 Dalmatian Street	Disney+	2020	Cancelled
March 1	Rapunzel's Tangled Adventure	Disney Channel	2017–2020	Ended
March 1	Sunny Day	Nick Jr.	2017–2020	Ended
March 7	Pokémon the Series: Sun & Moon – Ultra Legends	Disney XD	2019–2020	Ended
March 23	Ballmastrz: 9009	Adult Swim	2018–2020	Cancelled
March 27	Steven Universe Future	Cartoon Network	2019–2020	Ended
April 18	Doc McStuffins	Disney Junior	2012–2020	Ended
April 20	The Midnight Gospel	Netflix	2020	Cancelled
May 4	Star Wars: The Clone Wars	Disney+	2020	Ended
May 8	The Hollow	Netflix	2018–2020	Cancelled
May 15	She-Ra and the Princesses of Power	Netflix	2018–2020	Ended
May 22	Trailer Park Boys: The Animated Series	Netflix	2019–2020	Cancelled
June 7	Transformers: Cyberverse	Cartoon Network	2018–2020	Ended
June 14	The Shivering Truth	Adult Swim	2018–2020	Cancelled
June 15	Dinosaur Train	PBS Kids	2009–2020	Ended
July 17	Mao Mao: Heroes of Pure Heart	Cartoon Network	2019–2020	Cancelled
July 31	12 oz. Mouse	Adult Swim	2005–2007, 2020	Ended
August 2	The Rocketeer	Disney Junior	2019–2020	Cancelled
August 7	Wizards: Tales of Arcadia	Netflix	2020	Ended
August 7	Word Party Songs	Netflix	2020	Cancelled
August 17	Glitch Techs	Netflix	2020	Cancelled
August 21	Hoops	Netflix	2020	Cancelled
August 21	Elena of Avalor	Disney Channel, Disney Junior	2016–2020	Ended
August 27	Unikitty!	Cartoon Network	2017–2020	Ended
August 30	YOLO: Crystal Fantasy	Adult Swim	2020	Cancelled
September 4	Spirit Riding Free: Riding Academy	Netflix	2020	Ended
September 11	Buddi	Netflix	2020	Ended
October 2	Dorothy and the Wizard of Oz	Boomerang	2017–2020	Ended
October 9	Corn & Peg	Nickelodeon	2019–2020	Cancelled
October 12	Kipo and the Age of Wonderbeasts	Netflix	2020	Ended
October 25	Spider-Man (2017)	Disney XD	2017–2020	Ended
October 27	Chico Bon Bon: Monkey with a Tool Belt	Netflix	2020	Ended
October 29	Hotel Transylvania: The Series	Disney Channel	2017–2020	Cancelled
November 8	Our Cartoon President	Showtime	2018–20	Cancelled
November 17	The Boss Baby: Back in Business	Netflix	2018–20	Cancelled
December 4	The Epic Tales of Captain Underpants	Netflix	2018–20	Ended
December 5	ThunderCats Roar	Cartoon Network	2020	Ended
December 8	Spirit Riding Free	Netflix	2017–2020	Ended

== Television season premieres ==
Date	Title	Season	Channel, Streaming
January 6	Infinity Train	2	Cartoon Network
March 27	Paw Patrol	7	Nickelodeon (Note: Season later premiered in Canada on TVO on May 2nd.)
April 4	DuckTales (2017)	3	Disney XD
April 13	American Dad!	17	TBS
April 18	Victor and Valentino	2	Cartoon Network
June 12	F Is for Family	4	Netflix
June 21	Craig of the Creek	3	Cartoon Network
July 11	Amphibia	2	Disney Channel
July 21	Apple & Onion	3	Cartoon Network
August 13	Infinity Train	3	Cartoon Network
September 11	The Loud House	5	Nickelodeon
September 27	Bless the Harts	2	Fox
September 27	Bob's Burgers	11	Fox
September 27	Family Guy	19	Fox
September 27	The Simpsons	32	Fox
September 30	South Park	24	Comedy Central
October 22	SpongeBob SquarePants	13	Nickelodeon
December 4	Big Mouth	4	Netflix
December 14	Hilda	2	Netflix

== Television season finales ==
Date	Title	Season	Channel, Streaming
January 10	Infinity Train	2	Cartoon Network
January 12	Bless the Harts	1	Fox
February 22	Paw Patrol	6	TVO (Note: Season later concluded in the US on Nickelodeon on July 23, 2021.)
April 4	Teen Titans Go!	5	Cartoon Network
April 27	American Dad!	16	TBS
May 17	Bob's Burgers	10	Fox
May 17	Duncanville	1	Fox
May 17	Family Guy	18	Fox
May 17	The Simpsons	31	Fox
May 31	Rick and Morty	4	Adult Swim (Cartoon Network)
June 11	Craig of the Creek	2	Cartoon Network
June 12	F Is for Family	4	Netflix
July 20	Apple & Onion	2	Cartoon Network
July 23	The Loud House	4	Nickelodeon
August 23	The Owl House	1	Disney Channel
November 20	Animaniacs (2020)	1	Hulu
December 4	Big Mouth	4	Netflix
December 14	Hilda	2	Netflix
December 21	American Dad!	17	TBS

== Deaths ==
=== January ===
- January 2: John Baldessari, American conceptual artist (voiced himself in The Simpsons episode "3 Scenes Plus a Tag from a Marriage"), dies at age 88.
- January 5:
  - Denise Blakely Fuller, American background artist (Walt Disney Animation Studios, Jackie Chan Adventures, Coconut Fred's Fruit Salad Island) and matte painter (Toy Story 3, Brave, Hotel Transylvania, Cloudy with a Chance of Meatballs 2, The Book of Life), dies at age 52.
  - Blair Kitchen, Canadian animator (Nelvana, Titan A.E., Anne of Green Gables: The Animated Series, The Abrafaxe – Under The Black Flag, Osmosis Jones, The Ripping Friends, Kronk's New Groove, Curious George, Busytown Mysteries, Cuppa Coffee Studios, Looney Tunes Cartoons) and storyboard artist (Hoze Houndz, Nelvana, Johnny Test, The Book of Life, Trollhunters: Tales of Arcadia, Welcome to the Wayne, Ferdinand, Next Gen, Maya and the Three), dies at age 43.
- January 9: Yūji Yamaguchi, Japanese animator (Fate/stay night), dies at an unknown age.
- January 14: Jacques Toll, French animator and comics artist, dies at an unknown age.
- January 21: Terry Jones, Welsh-English actor, comedian, writer and film director (occasional voices in Terry Gilliam's animated shorts in Monty Python's Flying Circus and the film spin-offs, co-creator of Blazing Dragons), dies at age 77.
- January 23:
  - Marsha Kramer, American actress (additional voices in Antz, Ice Age, Jimmy Neutron: Boy Genius, The Simpsons Movie, The Lego Movie and The SpongeBob Movie: Sponge Out of Water), dies at age 74.
  - Zsolt Richly, Hungarian comic artist and animator (Pannonia Film Studio, A Kockásfülű nyúl), dies at age 78.
- January 25: Horst Alisch, German illustrator, comics artist and animator, dies at age 94.
- January 26: Kobe Bryant, American professional basketball player (wrote and narrated Dear Basketball, voiced himself in The Proud Family episode "One in a Million"), dies at age 41.
- January 27: Jack Burns, American comedian and actor (voice of Ralph Kane in Wait Till Your Father Gets Home, Sid the Squid in Animaniacs, Edward Christian in The Simpsons episode "Beyond Blunderdome"), dies at age 86.
- January 30: Fred Silverman, American television executive and producer (Scooby-Doo, Where Are You!, Mighty Orbots, Piggsburg Pigs!, creator of Meatballs & Spaghetti), dies from cancer at age 82.

=== February ===
- February 3: Philippe Adamov, French illustrator, animator and comics artist (Gandahar), dies at age 63.
- February 5: Kirk Douglas, American actor (voice of Chester J. Lampwick in The Simpsons episode "The Day the Violence Died"), dies at age 103.
- February 7: Orson Bean, American actor (voice of Bilbo Baggins in The Hobbit, and Frodo Baggins in The Return of the King, Billy Rabbit in Garfield in the Rough, Geppetto in the Tiny Toon Adventures episode "Fairy Tales for the 90's"), dies in a traffic collision at age 91.
- February 8: Ron McLarty, American actor, playwright and novelist (voice of Papa Bear and the Narrator in The Berenstain Bears specials, the General in Courage the Cowardly Dog), dies from dementia at age 72.
- February 13: Yoshisada Sakaguchi, Japanese actor (voice of Philip II of Macedon in Reign, Muijika in Mushishi, Hachiroh Tohbe in Jin-Roh: The Wolf Brigade, Tonpetty in JoJo's Bizarre Adventure: Phantom Blood), dies at age 80.
- February 16:
  - Zoe Caldwell, Australian-American actress (voice of the Grand Councilwoman in Lilo & Stitch), dies at age 86.
  - Jason Davis, American actor (voice of Mikey Blumberg in Recess), dies at age 35.
  - Maureen Mlynarczyk, American animation timer (Film Roman, Warner Bros. Animation, Disney Television Animation, Cartoon Network Studios, Rough Draft Studios), dies at age 47.
- February 17: Ja'Net DuBois, American actress and singer (voice of Mrs. Avery in The PJs, Mrs. Patterson in As Told by Ginger, Grams Hinton in the G.I. Joe: Renegades episode "Cousins"), dies from cardiac arrest at age 74.
- February 21:
  - Nicola Cuti, American comic book artist, animator (Defenders of the Earth, Barbie and the Rockers: Out of This World, BraveStarr, Disney Television Animation, The Brothers Flub), art director (Exosquad) and background artist (Double Dragon, Problem Child, The Critic, Street Fighter, Biker Mice from Mars, RoboCop: Alpha Commando, Dilbert, The Cramp Twins), dies at age 75.
  - Hisashi Katsuta, Japanese actor (voice of Professor Ochanomizu in Astro Boy, Dr. Hoshi in Astroganger, Professor Tobishima in Groizer X, Shin'ichirō Izumi in Tōshō Daimos), dies at age 92.
- February 22: Kazuhiko Kishino, Japanese actor (voice of Mayumi Kinniku in Kinnikuman), dies at age 86.
- February 29:
  - Luis Alfonso Mendoza, Mexican actor (dub voice of Gohan in Dragon Ball Z and Dragon Ball GT, Leonardo in Teenage Mutant Ninja Turtles), was murdered at age 55.
  - Alfred Budnick, American animator (Hanna-Barbera) and background artist (Hanna-Barbera, The Nine Lives of Fritz the Cat, Filmation, Camp Candy, Garfield and Friends, Family Dog, The Critic, Hey Arnold!, Hey Arnold!: The Movie, Party Wagon), dies at age 81.

=== March ===
- March 2: James Lipton, American writer, lyricist and actor (voice of The Director in Bolt, himself in The Simpsons episodes "The Sweetest Apu" and "Homer the Father"), dies from bladder cancer at age 93.
- March 3: David Wise, American television scriptwriter (Star Trek: The Animated Series, The Transformers, Teenage Mutant Ninja Turtles, Chip 'n Dale: Rescue Rangers, Batman: The Animated Series), dies at age 65.
- March 8: Max von Sydow, Swedish-French actor (voice of Klaus Ziegler in The Simpsons episode "The Art of War", narrator in Moomins and the Comet Chase, Zeus in the Swedish dub of Hercules), dies at age 90.
- March 10: Curtis Cim, American animator (Hanna-Barbera, Filmation, Zodiac Entertainment, King of the Hill, My Little Pony: A Very Minty Christmas) and storyboard artist (Calico Entertainment, King of the Hill, Warner Bros. Animation, Dragon Tales, Courage the Cowardly Dog, Scooby-Doo and the Cyber Chase, The Wild Thornberrys, As Told by Ginger, Clifford's Puppy Days, The Land Before Time, Curious George, Care Bears: Oopsy Does It!, My Little Pony: Twinkle Wish Adventure, Angelina Ballerina: The Next Steps), dies at age 65.
- March 19: Román Arámbula, Mexican comic book artist, animator (Hanna-Barbera), storyboard artist (Tubby the Tuba, TaleSpin, Little Shop, Attack of the Killer Tomatoes, Madeline, Warner Bros. Animation, Problem Child, 101 Dalmatians: The Series) and sheet timer (King of the Hill), dies at age 83.
- March 20: Giovanni Romanini, Italian animator and comics artist, dies from a heart attack at age 75.
- March 24:
  - Juan Padrón, Cuban comics artist and animator (Vampires in Havana), dies at age 73.
  - Albert Uderzo, French comics artist (creative advisor and designer for the Astérix animated films Asterix and Cleopatra and The 12 Tasks of Asterix), dies from a heart attack at age 92.
  - William Dufris, American actor and audiobook narrator (voice of the title character in Bob the Builder), dies from cancer at age 62.
- March 29: Ken Shimura, Japanese comedian (voice of Master Nyada in Yo-kai Watch: The Movie, dub voice of the title character in The Lorax), dies from COVID-19 at age 70.
- March 31:
  - Julie Bennett, American actress (voice of Penelope Pussycat in Louvre Come Back to Me!, Cindy Bear in The Yogi Bear Show, Aunt May in seasons 4 and 5 of Spider-Man), dies from COVID-19 at age 88.
  - Vincent Marzello, American actor (voice of Farmer Pickles and Robert in Bob the Builder), dies at age 68.

=== April ===
- April 1:
  - Adam Schlesinger, American musician, songwriter, composer (TV Funhouse) and record producer (performed the theme songs of T.U.F.F. Puppy, Supernoobs and Johnny Test), dies from COVID-19 at age 52.
  - Carl Banas, Canadian radio personality and actor (voice of Head Elf and Misfit Elephant in Rudolph the Red-Nosed Reindeer, Scorpion in Spider-Man, Schaeffer in The Raccoons), dies at age 91.
- April 2: Pamela Ross, American production manager (Doug, 101 Dalmatians: The Series, The Cramp Twins) and producer (Time Warp Trio, Tutenstein), dies at age 55.
- April 11: Paul Haddad, Canadian actor (voice of Uncle Arthur in Babar, Quicksilver and Arkon in X-Men: The Animated Series, Lefty in John Callahan's Quads!, Willy Stop in Rescue Heroes), dies at age 56.
- April 12:
  - Keiji Fujiwara, Japanese actor (voice of Maes Hughes in Fullmetal Alchemist, Ladd Russo in Baccano, Hiroshi Nohara in Crayon Shin-chan, Leorio Paladiknight in Hunter x Hunter, Iron Man in Marvel Anime: Iron Man, Baron Salamander in HeartCatch PreCure The Movie: Fashion Show in the Flower Capital... Really?!, Japanese dub voice of Spellbinder in Batman Beyond, Sinbad in Sinbad: Legend of the Seven Seas, Joker in Batman: The Brave and the Bold, Grimlock in Transformers: Animated, Lord Shen in Kung Fu Panda 2), dies at age 55.
  - Danny Goldman, American actor and casting director (voice of Brainy Smurf in The Smurfs, Cartoon All-Stars to the Rescue and Robot Chicken), dies from complications of two strokes at age 80.
- April 13:
  - Ann Sullivan, American animator (Walt Disney Animation Studios), dies from COVID-19 at age 91.
  - Kevin Kocvar, Canadian film editor (Toad Patrol, Toot & Puddle, Jimmy Two-Shoes, Stella and Sam, Camp Lakebottom, Atomic Puppet, If You Give a Mouse a Cookie, Hilda), dies at age 56.
- April 15: Brian Dennehy, American actor (voice of Django in Ratatouille, Babe Ruth in Everyone's Hero), dies at age 81.
- April 16: Gene Deitch, American comics artist, animator and film director (Munro, Tom Terrific, Nudnik, Popeye, Tom and Jerry), dies at age 95.
- April 19: Ian Whitcomb, English entertainer, singer-songwriter, composer (Bugs Bunny: Superstar), record producer, writer, broadcaster and actor (voice of the Narrator in A Christmas Carol), dies from a stroke at age 78.
- April 20: Nick Rijgersberg, Canadian animator (It's Punky Brewster, The Nutcracker Prince, The Raccoons, The Ren & Stimpy Show, CINAR, What's with Andy?), storyboard artist (Inspector Gadget, Bob the Builder), overseas supervisor (Conan the Adventurer) and director (CINAR, Bratz: Starrin' & Stylin', Bratz: Passion 4 Fashion Diamondz), dies at age 60.
- April 24: Rob Gibbs, American animator (FernGully: The Last Rainforest, Cool World, Dinosaur), storyboard artist (Hyperion Pictures, Pixar, The Boss Baby, Snoopy Presents: To Mom (and Dad), With Love), writer and director (Cars Toons), dies at age 55.
- April 29: Irrfan Khan, Indian actor (Hindi dub voice of Baloo in The Jungle Book), dies from cancer at age 53.

=== May ===
- May 7: Kiersten Harris, American voice actress (Craig of the Creek), dies at age 18.
- May 8: Roy Horn, German-American magician, entertainer and producer (Father of the Pride), dies from COVID-19 at age 75.
- May 9:
  - Little Richard, American rock musician (voiced himself in The Simpsons episode "Special Edna", performed the theme song of The Magic School Bus), dies at age 87.
  - Richard Sala, American comics artist, illustrator and animator (made animation for Liquid Television), dies at age 61.
- May 10: Martin Pasko, Canadian-American comics writer and animation writer (Thundarr the Barbarian, Teenage Mutant Ninja Turtles, Batman: The Animated Series), dies at age 65.
- May 11: Jerry Stiller, American actor and comedian (voice of Uncle Max in The Lion King 1½, Pretty Boy in Teacher's Pet, Murray Weiner in How Murray Saved Christmas, Principal Stickler in Fish Hooks), dies at age 92.
- May 14: Dominic Orlando, American animator and storyboard artist (CatDog, Dora the Explorer, Holly Hobbie & Friends), dies at an unknown age.
- May 15: Fred Willard, American actor and comedian (voice of Officer Brown in King of the Hill, Dave Campbell in Family Guy, Dad in Monster House, Jack Hench in Kim Possible, Boogie Man in The Grim Adventures of Billy and Mandy, Shelby Forthright in WALL-E, Melvin in Chicken Little, Pa in Buzz Lightyear of Star Command, Mr. Doozy in Mickey Mouse Mixed-Up Adventures, Pop-Pop in The Loud House, Sammy Raymond in the Hey Arnold! episode "Rich Guy", F.R.E.D. in the Dexter's Laboratory episode "Lab on the Run", Wally Kogen in The Simpsons episode "Sunday, Cruddy Sunday"), dies at age 86.
- May 22: Mike Laubach, American animator (VeggieTales), dies at age 45.
- May 28: Bob Kulick, American guitarist and record producer (co-wrote the song "Sweet Victory" which was used in the SpongeBob SquarePants episode "Band Geeks"), dies from heart disease at age 70.
- May 30: Michael Angelis, English actor (narrator of Thomas & Friends), dies from a heart attack at age 76.
- May 31: Jim Finch, animation producer (Disney Television Animation), dies at an unknown age.

=== June ===
- June 6: Dan Danglo, American animator (Terrytoons, Famous Studios, Warner Bros. Animation, Hanna-Barbera), dies at age 95.
- June 7: Hubert Gagnon, Canadian actor (dub voice of Optimus Prime in Transformers, and Homer Simpson and Grampa Simpson in The Simpsons), dies at age 73.
- June 11: Mel Winkler, American actor (voice of Lucius Fox in The New Batman Adventures, Johnny the snowman in Oswald, Commissioner Henderson in the Superman: The Animated Series episode "Feeding Time"), dies at age 78.
- June 19: Ian Holm, English actor (voice of Chef Skinner in Ratatouille, Pontius Pilate in The Miracle Maker), dies at age 88.
- June 26:
  - Milton Glaser, American graphic designer (Mickey Mouse in Vietnam, character designer on Norman Normal), dies at age 91.
  - Kelly Asbury, American storyboard artist (Walt Disney Animation Studios), screenwriter, actor (voice of Master of Ceremonies and Fiddlesworth in Shrek the Third, Red Goon Gnomes in Gnomeo & Juliet), author/illustrator and film director (Spirit: Stallion of the Cimarron, Shrek 2, Gnomeo and Juliet, Smurfs: The Lost Village, UglyDolls), dies at age 60.
- June 29: Carl Reiner, American actor, comedian, film director, and screenwriter (voice of Maz in Globehunters: An Around the World in 80 Days Adventure, Sarmoti in Father of the Pride, Murray in The Cleveland Show, Carl Reinoceros in Toy Story 4, Larry in Duck Duck Goose, Santa Claus in The Penguins of Madagascar and Shimmer and Shine, Captain Treasure Tooth in Jake and the Never Land Pirates, Shazam in the Justice League Action episode "Classic Rock (Shazam Slam: Part 1)", Henry in the Bob's Burgers episode "Father of the Bob"), dies at age 98.

=== July ===
- July 1: Marc Alberich Lluís, Spanish comics artist and animator, dies at age 49.
- July 6:
  - Ennio Morricone, Italian composer (Around the World with Peynet's Lovers, Aida of the Trees), dies at age 91.
  - Charlie Daniels, American country singer (voiced himself in King of the Hill and VeggieTales), dies at age 83.
- July 7: Mike Kricfalusi, American actor and father of John Kricfalusi (voice of Mr. Höek and Staff Lobster in Ren & Stimpy "Adult Party Cartoon"), dies at age 90.
- July 8: Naya Rivera, American actress, singer and model (voice of Sparkle in The Naughty List, Catwoman in Batman: The Long Halloween, Lolo Fuentes in the American Dad! episode "The Unincludeds"), drowns at age 33.
- July 12: Nurhasanah Iskandar, Indonesian actress (dub voice of the title character in Doraemon), dies at age 62.
- July 16: Danilo Tolentino, American animator (Anastasia, Bartok the Magnificent, Eight Crazy Nights), storyboard artist (Marvel Animation, Adventures from the Book of Virtues, The Prince of Atlantis, The Life & Adventures of Santa Claus) and background artist (RoboCop: Alpha Commando, The Life & Adventures of Santa Claus, The Hunchback of Notre Dame II), dies at an unknown age.
- July 17: John Lewis, American politician and civil rights activist (voiced himself in the Arthur episode "Arthur Takes a Stand"), dies from pancreatic cancer at age 80.
- July 22: Robert Smith, Canadian actor (voice of Spot in Rolie Polie Olie, Coach Rhineheart in Angela Anaconda, Goliath in Jojo's Circus, Holley in Miss Spider's Sunny Patch Friends, Trevor Potanski in Bad Dog), dies at age 55.
- July 24: Regis Philbin, American television presenter (voice of Typhon in Hercules, Mabel in Shrek the Third, himself in The Simpsons, Family Guy, and Lilo & Stitch: The Series), dies at age 88.
- July 30: Michael Yama, American actor (voice of Torpedo in G.I. Joe: A Real American Hero, Ancient One in Doctor Strange: The Sorcerer Supreme, Cain in Todd McFarlane's Spawn, Shyu in the Avatar: The Last Airbender episode "Winter Solstice, Part 2: Avatar Roku", Otaku in the Spicy City episode "Love is a Download", Oni in the Rocket Power episode "Tito-Thon", additional voices in The Invincible Iron Man), dies at age 76.

=== August ===
- August 1: Tom Pollock, American studio executive and film producer (Alienators: Evolution Continues), dies from a heart attack at age 77.
- August 22: Allan Rich, American actor (voice of Edward "King" Barlowe in The New Batman Adventures episode "Joker's Millions"), dies from dementia at age 94.
- August 26: Joe Ruby, American animator, screenwriter (Walt Disney Animation Studios, Hanna-Barbera, DePatie-Freleng Enterprises) and animation producer (co-founder of Ruby-Spears Productions, co-creator of Scooby-Doo), dies at age 87.
- August 28: Chadwick Boseman, American actor (voice of T'Challa/Black Panther in What If...?), dies at age 43.
- August 30: Anatoliy Prokhorov, Russian animation producer (Kikoriki, founder of Petersburg Animation Studio and co-founder of Pilot), dies at age 72.
- August 31: Norm Spencer, Canadian actor (voice of Cyclops in X-Men), dies at age 62.

=== September ===
- September 4: Annie Cordy, Belgian singer, comedian and actress (dub voice of Mother Willow in Pocahontas), dies at age 92.
- September 11: Roger Carel, French actor (voice of Asterix and Dogmatix, French dub voice of Winnie-the-Pooh, Piglet, Rabbit, Mickey Mouse, Yogi Bear, Foghorn Leghorn, Fritz the Cat, and Flintheart Glomgold), dies at age 93.
- September 21: Ron Cobb, American cartoonist, animator, film set designer, TV director and scriptwriter (Walt Disney Animation Studios), dies at age 83.
- September 29: Helen Reddy, Australian-American singer and actress (portrayed Nora in Pete's Dragon, voiced herself in Family Guy), dies at age 78.
- September 30: Phil Walsh, American television producer and writer (Disney Television Animation, The Land Before Time, Pound Puppies, creator of Teamo Supremo), dies at an unknown age.

=== October ===
- October 12: Conchata Ferrell, American actress (voice of Roxanne in Duckman, Bob's Mom in Frankenweenie, Ma Munchapper in Buzz Lightyear of Star Command, Dr. Greer in The Zeta Project episode "The Next Gen", Miss Effluvium in the Lloyd in Space episode "Incident at Luna Vista"), dies at age 77.
- October 15: Martin Strudler, American animator and background designer (Warner Bros. Animation, Muppet Babies, Dungeons & Dragons, Wizards), dies at age 91.
- October 16: Mannix Bennett, American animator (An American Tail), background artist (Sullivan Bluth Studios, The Thief and the Cobbler, The Pink Panther, Rich Animation Studios, The Pagemaster, Earthworm Jim, The Hunchback of Notre Dame, Cats Don't Dance, Quest for Camelot, Scooby-Doo on Zombie Island, The Angry Beavers, Fantasia 2000, 101 Dalmatians II: Patch's London Adventure, Arthur Christmas, Hotel Transylvania) and visual effects artist (Digital Domain, Rhythm and Hues Studios), dies at an unknown age.
- October 21: Marge Champion, American dancer and actress (model for the title character in Snow White and the Seven Dwarfs, the Blue Fairy in Pinocchio, Hyacinth Hippo in Fantasia and Mr. Stork in Dumbo), dies at age 101.
- October 24: Dorris Bergstrom, American animator (Walt Disney Animation Studios, Hanna-Barbera, The U.S. of Archie, The Tom and Jerry Comedy Show, The Lord of the Rings, Warner Bros. Animation, The Grinch Grinches the Cat in the Hat, It's Flashbeagle, Charlie Brown, The Chipmunk Adventure), dies at age 97.
- October 27: Victor Lew, American visual effects artist (DreamWorks Animation), dies at age 38.
- October 28: Bobby Ball, British comic, actor, singer and television host (voice of Wayne the Zebra in the Rex the Runt episode of the same name), dies at age 76.
- October 31: Sean Connery, Scottish actor (voice of Draco in Dragonheart, and the title character in Sir Billi), dies at age 90.

=== November ===
- November 1: Barbera DeLiso, American xerographer (Pac-Man, The Swan Princess), dies at age 81.
- November 2:
  - Elsa Raven, American actress (voice of Hannele in American Pop), dies at age 91.
  - Tony Eastman, American animator (Sniz & Fondue, Saturday TV Funhouse, Between the Lions, Courage the Cowardly Dog, Harvey Birdman, Attorney at Law), storyboard artist (Beavis and Butt-Head, Beavis and Butt-Head Do America, Daria, Sheep in the Big City, I Spy, Codename: Kids Next Door) and director (Doug), dies at age 77.
  - Gigi Proietti, Italian actor (voice of the Genie in Aladdin, Devon and Cornwall in Quest for Camelot, Sylvester in Looney Tunes, Draco in Dragonheart, and Bryan in Happy Feet Two), dies from heart attack at age 80.
- November 4: Sergio Matteucci, Italian actor and radio presenter (dub voice of Saiyan B in Dragon Ball Z, narrator in Dastardly and Muttley in Their Flying Machines), dies at age 89.
- November 5: Hana Kukal, Slovak-born Canadian animator (Atkinson Film-Arts, The Raccoons, FernGully: The Last Rainforest, Rupert, Lacewood Productions, Once Upon a Forest, Problem Child, Eight Crazy Nights, The Secret World of Benjamin Bear), storyboard artist (Stickin' Around, Hippo Tub Co., Pound Puppies, Almost Naked Animals, Daniel Tiger's Neighborhood, PAW Patrol) and director (Katie and Orbie, Dirtgirlworld), dies from cancer at age 59.
- November 6: Ken Spears, American animation writer, sound editor and producer (Hanna-Barbera, co-creator of Scooby-Doo, co-founder of Ruby-Spears Enterprises), dies at age 82.
- November 7: Norm Crosby, American actor and comedian (voice of Mr. Hayman in Buzz Lightyear of Star Command, the Judge in Eight Crazy Nights), dies from heart failure at age 93.
- November 8: Alex Trebek, Canadian-American game show host and television personality (voice of Alan Quebec in the Rugrats episode "Game Show Didi", Announcer in The Magic School Bus episode "Shows and Tells", Alex Lebek in the Arthur episode "Arthur and the Big Riddle", voiced himself in The Simpsons episodes "Miracle on Evergreen Terrace" and "Penny-Wiseguys", the Pepper Ann episodes "Unhappy Campers" and "The Finale", the Family Guy episode "I Take Thee Quagmire", and the Scooby-Doo and Guess Who? episode "Total Jeopardy"), dies from pancreatic cancer at age 80.
- November 9: Ro Marcenaro, Italian animator and comics artist, dies at age 83.
- November 14: Armen Dzhigarkhanyan, Soviet, Armenian and Russian actor (voice of the Wolf in Once Upon a Dog, John Silver in Treasure Island, Vasily Petrovich the robot teacher in first episodes of Alisa Knows What to Do!, Russian dub voice of Doc Hudson in Cars, Carl Fredricksen in Up), dies at age 85.
- November 15: Hikari Yoko, Japanese actress (Sailor Moon Crystal, Naruto: Shippuden), dies at age 46.
- November 16: David Hemblen, English-born Canadian actor (voice of Magneto in X-Men, Vault-Keeper in Tales from the Cryptkeeper, Asmodeus in Redwall, The Night Master in Yin Yang Yo!), dies at age 79.
- November 18:
  - Jonas Rodrigues de Mello, Brazilian actor (voice of Shadowseat in Cassiopeia, Montanha in The Happy Cricket and the Giant Bugs, Brazilian dub voice of various villains in Dragon Ball Z and Rataxes in The Adventures of Babar), dies at age 83.
  - Kirby Morrow, Canadian actor, writer and comedian (voice of Cyclops in X-Men: Evolution, Jay in Class of the Titans, Sgt. "Powerhouse" Walker in Major Powers and the Star Squad, Hot Shot in Transformers: Cybertron, Miroku in Inuyasha, Van Fanel in the Ocean dub of Escaflowne, Teru Mikami in Death Note, Trowa Barton in Mobile Suit Gundam Wing, Ryo Takatsuki in Project ARMS, Goku in the Ocean dub of Dragon Ball Z (from Episode 160 onwards), Cole in Ninjago), dies at age 47.
  - Michel Robin, French actor (voice of Champion in Les Triplettes de Belleville), dies from COVID-19 at age 90.
- November 21: Malcolm Marmorstein, American film director and screenwriter (Pete's Dragon), dies from cancer at age 92.
- November 22: Changiz Jalilvand, Iranian actor (dub voice of Bert in Mary Poppins), dies from COVID-19 at age 80.
- November 30: Enrico Bertorelli, Italian actor (dub voice of Cell and Commander Red in Dragon Ball Z, Jim Gordon in Batman: The Animated Series), dies at age 78.
- Specific date unknown: Alan Short, British animator (Arthur Christmas, Watership Down), dies at age 62.

=== December ===
- December 2:
  - Richard Corben, American animator, illustrator, comics writer, comics artist (Neverwhere, wrote the script for the Den segment in Heavy Metal) and colorist, dies at age 80.
  - Lester Pourier, American animator and layout artist (Hanna-Barbera, Garfield and Friends, Tom and Jerry: The Movie), dies at age 89.
  - Cullen Blaine, American animator (Hanna-Barbera, Alvin and the Chipmunks, Denver, the Last Dinosaur, The Simpsons, Garfield and Friends, Nine Dog Christmas), storyboard artist (Hanna-Barbera. Ruby-Spears Enterprises, Marvel Productions, DIC Entertainment, Ghostbusters, The Berenstain Bears, Spiral Zone, Garfield and Friends, Teenage Mutant Ninja Turtles, Calico Entertainment, Animaniacs, Timon & Pumbaa, Hey Arnold!, The Magic School Bus, God, the Devil and Bob, Grandma Got Run Over by a Reindeer, Globehunters: An Around the World in 80 Days Adventure, Make Way for Noddy, Barbie: Fairytopia, Arthur's Missing Pal, Higglytown Heroes), sheet timer (Warner Bros. Animation, DIC Entertainment, Jetlag Productions, Life with Louie, Happily Ever After: Fairy Tales for Every Child, Disney Television Animation, Jumanji, Toonsylvania, Silver Surfer, Dora the Explorer, All Grown Up!, Tutenstein, The Secret Saturdays, G.I. Joe: Renegades), writer (The Pink Panther Show), producer (The Get Along Gang) and director (Return to the Planet of the Apes, DIC Entertainment, Garfield and Friends, Hey Arnold!, Disney Television Animation, Kid Notorious), dies at age 85.
- December 4: David Lander, American actor and comedian (voice of Smart Ass the Weasel in Who Framed Roger Rabbit, Doc-Boy Arbuckle in A Garfield Christmas Special and The Garfield Show, Horace Badun in 101 Dalmatians: The Series, Arthur in Jungle Cubs, Thumper in A Bug's Life, Squiggy in The Simpsons episode "Helter Shelter", Jerry Lewis in Will the Real Jerry Lewis Please Sit Down, Nitro in the Batman: The Animated Series episode "Appointment in Crime Alley", Henry in Oswald, Brain and Curtis in The Grim Adventures of Billy & Mandy, Les in Hopeless Pictures, Leonard Weems in Recess, Milo de Venus in Galaxy High School, Ch'p in Green Lantern: First Flight, Glam-Vampire Member in The Problem Solverz episode "Glam-Vampire Hunterz", Donnie the Shark in the SpongeBob SquarePants episode "Sharks vs. Pods", Sqweek in the Superman: The Animated Series episode "The Main Man", the title character in the Hey Arnold! episode "The Sewer King"), dies at age 73.
- December 10: Tommy Lister Jr., American actor and professional wrestler (voice of Finnick in Zootopia and Zootopia 2 (posthumous), Mr. Mussels in Fish Hooks, Bobby in Regular Show, Filbert Slowlove in The Boondocks episode "The New Black"), dies at age 62.
- December 12: Bob Kaliban, American actor, singer, and musician (voice of Daddy in A Family Circus Christmas, Big Paw and Announcer in The Berenstain Bears Meet Bigpaw, Croak and Slick in The Missing Link, Bewildered Bat in I Go Pogo, Bramble Brother #2 in The Charmkins, Lou and Mr. Chips in Schoolhouse Rock!, Josh, Merlin and King Jared in Princess Gwenevere and the Jewel Riders, Little Cup and Plush in A Little Curious, Judge, Police Chief and Mayor in Top Cat: The Movie), dies at age 87.
- December 14: Alan Decker, American re-recording mixer (Dragon Tales, Jackie Chan Adventures, Max Steel, Harold and the Purple Crayon, The Simpsons), dies at age 69.
- December 16: Emil Cadkin, American composer (SpongeBob SquarePants, Ren & Stimpy: Adult Party Cartoon, Camp Lazlo, The Mighty B!), dies at age 100.
- December 17: Doug Crane, American comics artist and animator (Terrytoons, Hanna-Barbera, Filmation, Spider-Man, Heavy Metal, Beavis and Butt-Head), dies at age 85.
- December 20: Chad Stuart, English singer and actor (voice of Flaps in The Jungle Book), dies at age 80.
- December 21: Aleksandr Kurlyandsky, Soviet and Russian animation screenwriter (Well, Just You Wait!, Happy Merry-Go-Round, Baba Yaga is against!, O, more, more!) and author, dies at age 82.
- December 22: Tuck Tucker, American animator (Filmation, The Little Mermaid, The Simpsons, Rugrats, The Ren & Stimpy Show), storyboard artist (ALF: The Animated Series, Alf Tales, 2 Stupid Dogs, Klasky Csupo, Nickelodeon Animation Studio, Cartoon Network Studios, Looney Tunes, Family Guy, All Hail King Julien), sheet timer (Clarence), writer (SpongeBob SquarePants, Camp Lazlo) and director (Nickelodeon Animation Studio, Drawn Together), dies at age 59.
- December 29: Claude Bolling, French composer (Daisy Town, The Ballad of the Daltons), dies at age 90.
- December 30:
  - Brenda Banks, American animator (Ruby-Spears Enterprises, Hanna-Barbera, Looney Tunes, This Is America, Charlie Brown, The Pagemaster, The Simpsons, King of the Hill), dies at age 72.
  - Dawn Wells, American actress (voice of Mary Ann Summers and Ginger Grant in Gilligan's Planet, Gumbalina Toothington in The Epic Tales of Captain Underpants episode "The Ghastly Danger of the Ghost Dentist"), dies at age 82.
- December 31: Taran Kootenhayoo, Canadian actor (voice of Randall in Molly of Denali), dies of leukemia cancer at age 27.

== See also ==
- 2020 in anime
- List of animated television series of 2020
