= List of animated television series of 2020 =

This is a list of animated television series first aired in 2020.

Title	Seasons	Episodes	Country	Year	Original network	Technique
100% Wolf: Legend of the Moonstone	2	52	Australia	2020–23	ABC Me	CGI
Adventure Time: Distant Lands	1	4	United States	2020–21	HBO Max	Traditional
Alice & Lewis	2	104	France	2020–23	TF1	CGI
Alien TV	2	26	Australia; Canada	2020–21	Netflix; 9Go!	CGI/Live action
Alphablocks: Word Magic	1	26	United Kingdom	2020	BBC iPlayer	CGI
Angry Birds Slingshot Stories	2	40	Finland	2020–present	YouTube	CGI
Animaniacs (2020)	3	36	United States	2020–23	Hulu	Flash/Traditional
Any Malu Show	2	26	Brazil	2020–21	Cartoon Network	Flash
At Home with Olaf	1	20	United States	2020	YouTube	CGI
Baby Shark's Big Show!	3	91	South Korea, United States	2020–25	EBS Korea, Nickelodeon, YouTube	Toon Boom Harmony
Back to Back	1	26	Russia	2020–present	Carousel	Flash
Bapu	2	208	India	2020–present	Disney Channel	
Blood of Zeus	3	24	United States	2020–25	Netflix	Traditional
Book Hungry Bears	1	52	Canada	2020	TVOKids	CGI
Boon and Pimento	1	30	France	2020	YouTube	CGI
Buddi	2	16	China; United Kingdom	2020	Netflix	CGI
Catch! Teenieping	6	182	South Korea	2020–present	KBS2 (season 1); JEI TV (seasons 2–present)	CGI
Central Park	3	39	United States	2020–22	Apple TV+	Flash/Traditional
Chico Bon Bon: Monkey with a Tool Belt	4	38	United States	2020	Netflix	CGI
Cleopatra in Space	3	26	United States	2020–21	DreamWorks Channel, Peacock	Flash
Close Enough	3	24	United States	2020–22	HBO Max	Traditional
Coach Me If You Can	1	52	France	2020–present	France 4, Okoo	Flash
Core Sense	1	13	China	2020	Bilibili	CGI
Crossing Swords	2	20	United States	2020–21	Hulu	Stop-Motion
Deathstroke: Knights & Dragons	1	1	United States	2020	CW Seed	Traditional
Denis and Me	3	35	Canada	2020–23	YouTube	Flash
Dicktown	2	20	United States	2020–22	FXX	Traditional/Flash
The Dog & Pony Show	1	23	Canada	2020–present	Treehouse TV	Flash
Dog Loves Books	1	52	Britain	2020	CBeebies	Flash
Doomsday Brothers	1	18	Canada	2020–21	Adult Swim (Canada), Télétoon la nuit	Flash
Dorg Van Dango	1	52	Canada	2020–21	Family Channel; Nickelodeon	Flash
Doug Unplugs	2	26	United States	2020–22	Apple TV+	CGI
Droners	2	52	France	2020–24	TF1	Flash
Duncanville	3	33	United States	2020–22	Fox	Traditional
Elinor Wonders Why	2	60	Canada, United States	2020–present	PBS Kids	Toon Boom Harmony
The Fungies!	3	80	United States	2020–21	Cartoon Network, HBO Max	Traditional
Gadget Guru Ganesha	2	204	India	2020–present	Disney Channel	
Glitch Techs	2	19	United States	2020	Nickelodeon, Netflix	Flash
Go! Go! Cory Carson	6	63	France, United States	2020–21	Netflix	CGI
Hanni and the Wild Woods	1	52	South Korea	2020–present	SBS	CGI
Heaven Official's Blessing	2	23	China	2020–23	Bilibili	Traditional
Hello Kitty and Friends: Supercute Adventures	13	180	United States; Brazil; Japan	2020–present	YouTube	Flash
Henrietta	1	52	Germany	2020	KiKa	CGI
Hero Circle	2	52	South Korea	2020–21	EBS	Flash
Hero Elementary	1	40	Canada; United States	2020–22	TVOKids, PBS Kids	Flash
Hoops	1	10	United States	2020	Netflix	Flash
I, Elvis Riboldi	1	52	France, Spain	2020–present	Cartoon Network (UK and Ireland); Cartoon Network (Africa); ABC Me (Australia); Canal+ Kids, Télétoon+, and TV5Monde (France); Super3 (Spain)	Flash
IN:APP	1	56	South Korea	2020	KBS1	CGI
It's Pony	2	40	Britain	2020–22	Nickelodeon	Traditional/Flash
Jessy and Nessy	1	10	United States	2020–present	Amazon Prime Video	CGI/Live-Action
JJ Villard's Fairy Tales	1	6	United States	2020	Adult Swim	Traditional
JoJo & Gran Gran	2	54	Britain	2020–present	CBeebies	Flash
Jurassic World Camp Cretaceous	5	50	United States	2020–22	Netflix	CGI
Kid Lucky	1	52	France	2020–present	M6	Flash
Killer Bean	1	2	United States	2020	YouTube	CGI
Kinderwood	1	30	United States	2020–21	Noggin	Flash
Kipo and the Age of Wonderbeasts	3	30	United States, South Korea	2020	Netflix	Traditional
Lego Monkie Kid	5	54	Australia; Canada; China; Denmark; United States	2020–24	Amazon Kids+, HappyKids, Peacock	Traditional; Flash (2024)
The Liberator	1	4	United States	2020	Netflix	Traditional
Lil Wild	3	56	Singapore	2020–23	Channel 5	CGI
Looney Tunes Cartoons	6	81	United States	2020–24	HBO Max	Traditional/Flash (Some Segments)
Love Monster!	2	80	Britain	2020–22	Cbeebies, Cartoonito	Flash
Madagascar: A Little Wild	8	50	United States	2020–22	Hulu, Peacock	CGI
Magical Girl Friendship Squad: Origins	1	6	United States	2020	Syfy	Flash
Magical Girl Friendship Squad	1	6	United States	2020	Syfy	Flash
MeteoHeroes	1	52	Italy	2020–23	Cartoonito, Boomerang	Flash
Mia's Magic Playground	2	24	British	2020–23	Viaplay	CGI
The Midnight Gospel	1	8	United States	2020	Netflix	Flash/Traditional
Mighty Express	7	44	Canada	2020–22	Netflix	CGI
The Mighty Ones	4	40	United States	2020–22	Hulu, Peacock	Flash
Mira, Royal Detective	2	54	United States	2020–22	Disney Junior	CGI
Moka's Fabulous Adventures!	1	78	France	2020	Gulli	Flash
Momonsters	1	52	Spain	2020–present	Clan TV	CGI
Monster Beach	1	52	Australia	2020	Cartoon Network	Flash
Mush-Mush & the Mushables	1	50	France	2020–21	RTS 1	CGI
My Color Friends		28	United States	2020	BabyFirst	CGI/Flash
My Little Pony: Pony Life	2	40	United States, Ireland	2020–21	Treehouse TV (Canada); Discovery Family (U.S.)	Flash
Numberville	2	28	Israel	2020–21	Kan Educational	CGI
Ollie's Pack	1	27	Canada	2020–21	YTV	Toon Boom Harmony
Onyx Equinox	1	12	United States	2020	Crunchyroll	Traditional
The Owl House	3	43	United States	2020–23	Disney Channel	Traditional
Pikwik Pack	1	26	Canada	2020–21	Treehouse TV	Flash
Pinaki & Happy - The Bhoot Bandhus	1	26	India	2020	Nickelodeon Sonic	Flash
Pins and Nettie	1	26	Ireland	2020	RTÉjr	Flash
Pompon Little Bear	1	51	France	2020–present	France 5	Flash
Powerbirds	1	20	United States, Canada	2020	Universal Kids	Flash
Puppies and Kittens	1	21	Russia	2020–present	Carousel	CGI
A Record of Mortal's Journey to Immortality	4	168	China	2020–present	Bilibili	CGI
Regular Old Bogan	1	6	Australia	2020	7mate	Flash
Remy & Boo	1	26	Canada	2020	Universal Kids	CGI
Rhyme Time Town	2	21	United States	2020–21	Netflix	Flash
Santiago of the Seas	2	58	United States	2020–23	Nickelodeon/Nick Jr.	CGI
Search and Explore	2	16	United States	2020–21	Tubi	Flash
Smashing Simmba	3		India	2020–present	Pogo	
Solar Opposites	6	63	United States	2020–25	Hulu	Flash
Spirit Riding Free: Riding Academy	2	16	United States	2020–present	Netflix	CGI
Star Trek: Lower Decks	5	50	United States	2020–24	Paramount+	Flash
StarBeam	4	33	United States; Canada	2020–21	Netflix	CGI
Stillwater	4	35	United States; France	2020–present	Apple TV+	CGI
Tales & Friends		20	United States	2020	BabyFirst	Flash
That's Joey!	1	52	France	2020–present	M6	CGI
ThunderCats Roar	1	52	United States	2020	Cartoon Network	Traditional
Tig n' Seek	4	80	United States	2020–22	HBO Max	Traditional
Time Traveler Luke	1	52	South Korea	2020–21	KBS1	CGI
Ting Tong	1	200	India	2020–present	Nickelodeon; Nickelodeon Sonic	
Tish Tash	1	52	Britain; South Korea; Singapore	2020–present	EBS1 (South Korea); CBeebies (United Kingdom)	Flash
Titoo			India	2020–present	Pogo	
Toca Life Stories	1	42	United States	2020–present	YouTube	Flash
Tooning Out the News	2	120	United States	2020–22	Paramount+	Traditional/Flash/Live-Action
Topo Gigio	1	52	Italy	2020–present	Rai Yoyo	Flash
Transformers: War for Cybertron Trilogy	3	18	United States	2020–21	Netflix	CGI
Trash Truck	2	28	United States	2020–21	Netflix	CGI
Trolls: TrollsTopia	7	52	Canada; United States	2020–22	Hulu, Peacock	Flash
Wild Life	1	6	United States	2020	Syfy	Flash
Wizards: Tales of Arcadia	1	10	United States	2020	Netflix	CGI
The Wonderful World of Mickey Mouse	2	25	United States	2020–23	Disney+	Traditional/Flash
YOLO	3	24	Australia, United States	2020–25	Adult Swim	Flash
Zoe & Milo	1	26	France	2020–present	France 4	Flash

== See also ==
- 2020 in animation
- 2020 in anime
- List of animated feature films of 2020
