= Irela Bravo =

Cuban actress

- Born: July 24, 1953 (age 72); Santiago de Cuba, Cuba
- Occupations: Announcer; actress; TV host
- Years active: 1970s-present
- Notable work: El Halcón (actress); Entre tú y yo (announcer); Elpidio Valdés (dubbing artist); Vivir del cuento (Cachita)
- Awards: Caracol Award, Caricato Award and Radio National Festival Award

Irela Bravo (born July 24, 1953) is a Cuban announcer and actress. She has received the Caricato Award, awarded by the UNEAC. She is the announcer on the weekly talk show Entre tú y yo (Between Me and You). She provided the voices of María Silvia and Eutelia in the Cuban cartoon Elpidio Valdés.

== Early life and career ==
Bravo was born in Santiago de Cuba on July 24, 1953. She began her artistic studies at the School of Formation of Actors of the Cuban Institute of Broadcasting in 1971.

During her education period, she began to work as an actress for radio, where she has alternated locution and acting through the years, besides making her foray into cinema, theatre and television. Bravo has devoted great part of her work to children's programmes. In 1997 she received a recognition from the Ministry of Education, for her work in favour of childhood.

Bravo was an outstanding figure in Radio Progreso through the years for her quality as an actress in telenovelas, adventure television shows, plays and children programmes In television she is best recognised for her role in the adventure television show El Halcón (The Hawk), along with the dead actor Jorge Villazón. On numerous occasions Bravo has worked in drama television programmes and over many years, she has been the announcer of the weekly show Entre tú y yo (Between you and me), which is broadcast by Cubavisión Channel every Saturday evening since March 1999.

She also has dubbed María Silvia character's voice in the adventure film Elpidio Valdés, created by Juan Padrón, who has received the Cinema National Award and Humour National Award. Bravo has also collaborated with Padrón in Filminutos and ¡Vampiros en La Habana! films.
