= Elpidio Valdés =

Cuban comic strip series

- Elpidio Valdés Fuerza la Trocha (1978)
- Author: Juan Padrón (1970 – 2020)
- Owner: ICAIC (Animated films)
- Illustrator: Juan Padrón
- Current status/schedule: Ongoing
- Launch date: Pionero magazine (1970)
- Alternate name: Pidio Valdés
- Publisher(s): Pionero Magazine (1970 – 1980); Zunzún Magazine (1980 – present)
- Genre(s): Comedy, War
- Original language: Spanish
- Preceded by: Kisibashi (1966 – 1970)

Elpidio Valdés is a Cuban comic strip series created in 1970 by cartoonist and Cuban filmmaker Juan Padrón, considered the father of Cuban film animation and director of the first three animated feature films produced by the Cuban Institute of Cinematographic Art and Industry.

The series starrs Elpidio Valdes, a mambí colonel fighting for the liberation of their homeland from Spanish colonialism, commanding a squadron of cavalry, and represents the Cuban peasants in the 19th century Army of liberation. He owes his name to Cecilia Valdés, Cuban protagonist of a novel of the 19th century. Elpidio Valdes was intended to strengthen among Cuban children and youth a particular state view of an alleged authentic expression of the characters of the Cuban nationality.

== Plot ==
Elpidio Valdés was born in the 1870s, in a field of battle during the Ten Years' War. He was son of a rebel army officer and a peasant woman. In 1895, he joined the Liberation Army in the beginning of the War of Independence. His father caught in an ambush at the beginning of the war, in which his mother continued to work in exile. He reaches the rank of colonel and survives the end of the war and during the Republic. He married in full battle with his girlfriend Maria Silvia with whom he has a son. The character's story is told in three films.

== Characters ==
=== Elpidio Valdés ===
The main protagonist of the series.

=== Colonel Valdés ===
The father of Elpidio Valdés.

=== Maria Silvia ===
His girlfriend and (later) wife.

=== Palmiche ===
His horse, of several shades of brown and orange.

=== Commander Marcia ===
His assistant. He died in combat in 1898.

=== General Resóplez ===
Elpidio Valdés' greatest enemy.

=== Colonel Andaluz ===
Resóplez's assistant.

=== Colonel Cetáceo ===
Resóplez's nephew.

=== Pepito ===
Child soldier mambí.

=== Eutelia ===
Girl and the assistant of Maria Silvia.

=== Mister Chains ===
American landowner.

=== Media Cara ===
The captain of the counterinsurgency.

=== Oliverio ===
The inventor of the troops.

=== General Pérez ===
The head of Elpidio Valdés.

=== Cortico ===
Media Cara counterguerrilla.

== Production ==
The creator, writer and senior editor of the series is Juan Padrón. Also participated as directors Tulio Raggi, Mario Rivas and Juan Ruiz.

The theme song from the original series, the "Ballad of Elpidio", is composed and performed by Silvio Rodríguez over music of Lucas de la Guardia. The theme of the second film and the second and third series of short films was composed by Daniel Longrés.

Cuban actor Frank Gonzalez voiced Elpidio and several other characters. Other voices were provided by Tony Gonzalez, Manuel Marin, Eddy Vidal, Maria Eugenia Garcia, Irela Bravo, Juan Julio Alfonso, Teresita Rúa and Erdwin Fernández.

== Feature films ==
=== Elpidio Valdés (1979) ===
Has the birth of Elpidio, his father's death and the beginning of the War of Independence He meets Maria Silvia and becomes a scourge to the Spanish army, the U.S. counter-guerrilla and landowners. It takes place almost entirely in 1895.

=== Elpidio Valdés contra Dólar y Cañón (1983) ===
Elpidio accounts for the efforts of Cuba to carry a cargo of arms from the United States. It takes place between 1896 and 1897.

=== Elpidio Valdés contra el águila y el león (1995) ===
The adventures of Elpidio during the American intervention in the War of Independence. This film is formatted between fiction and documentary animation.

== Television series ==
=== Más se perdió en Cuba (1999) ===
Extended version of Elpidio Valdés contra el águilla y el león into 5 episodes.

== Short films ==
=== 1974 ===
No.	Film	Release date
01	Elpidio Valdés contra el tren militar	1974
02	Una aventura de Elpidio Valdés	1974

=== 1975 ===
Installment	Film	Release date
03	El machete	1975

=== 1976 ===
No.	Film	Release date
04	Clarín mambí	1976
05	Elpidio Valdés asalta el convoy	1976
06	Elpidio Valdés contra la policía de Nueva York	1976

=== 1977 ===
No.	Film	Release date
07	Elpidio Valdés contra el tren militar	1977
08	Una aventura de Elpidio Valdés	1977

=== 1978 ===
No.	Film	Release date
09	Elpidio Valdés contra los rayadillos	1978
10	Elpidio Valdés fuerza la trocha	1978

=== 1979 ===
No.	Film	Release date
11	Elpidio Valdés y el fusil	1979

=== 1980 ===
No.	Film	Release date
12	Elpidio Valdés contra la cañonera	1980

=== 1988 ===
No.	Film	Release date
13	Elpidio Valdés en compaña de verano	1988
14	Elpidio Valdés ¡Capturado!	1988

- Elpidio Valdés en campaña de verano (1988)
- Elpidio Valdés ¡Capturado! (1988)
- Elpidio Valdés ataca a Jutía Dulce (1988)
- Elpidio Valdés y el 5to de cazadores (1988)

=== 1989 ===
- Elpidio Valdés y Palmiche contra los lanceros (1989)
- Elpidio Valdés y la abuelita de Weyler (1989)

=== 1991 ===
- Elpidio Valdés se casa (1991)

=== 1992 ===
- Elpidio Valdés conoce a Fito (1992)
- Elpidio Valdés y los inventores (1992)

=== 2000 ===
- Elpidio Valdés contra el fortín de hierro (2000)
- Elpidio Valdés se enfrenta a Resóplez (2000)

=== 2002 ===
- Pepe descubre la rueda (2002)

=== 2003 ===
- Elpidio Valdés ataca Trancalapuerta (2003)

=== 2015 ===
- Elpidio Valdés especial (2015)

== Print edition ==
The comic strip appeared in 1970 in the Pionero magazine. Since 1980, it was published monthly in the magazine Zunzún.
