= 2020 in anime =

Events in 2020 in anime.

== Releases ==
=== Films ===
A list of anime that debuted in theaters between January 1 and December 31, 2020.

Release date	Title	Studio	Director(s)	Running time (minutes)	Ref
January 10	The Island of Giant Insects	Passione	Takeo Takahashi; Naoyuki Tatsuwa	76	
January 17	Made in Abyss: Dawn of the Deep Soul	Kinema Citrus	Masayuki Kojima	105	
January 18	High School Fleet: The Movie	A-1 Pictures	Yuu Nobuta (Chief); Jun Nakagawa	105	
February 1	Goblin Slayer: Goblin's Crown	White Fox	Takaharu Ozaki	75	
February 15	Saezuru Tori wa Habatakanai – The Clouds Gather	Grizzly	Kaori Makita	85	
February 21	Digimon Adventure: Last Evolution Kizuna	Yumeta Company	Tomohisa Taguchi	94	
February 21	Sekai-ichi Hatsukoi: Propose-hen	Studio Deen	Tomoya Takahashi	21	
February 29	Shirobako: The Movie	P.A. Works	Tsutomu Mizushima	119	
March 27	Psycho-Pass 3: First Inspector	Production I.G	Naoyoshi Shiotani	137	
August 7	Doraemon: Nobita's New Dinosaur	Shin-Ei Animation	Kazuaki Imai	111	
August 7	Revue Starlight Rondo Rondo Rondo	Kinema Citrus	Tomohiro Furukawa	119	
August 14	Date A Bullet: Dead or Bullet	Geek Toys	Jun Nakagawa	24	
August 15	Fate/stay night: Heaven's Feel III. spring song	Ufotable	Tomonori Sudō	122	
August 22	Given	Lerche	Hikaru Yamaguchi	59	
September 5	"Hataraku Saibō!!" Saikyō no Teki, Futatabi. Karada no Naka wa "Chō" Ōsawagi!	David Production	Hirofumi Ogura	112	
September 11	Crayon Shin-chan: Crash! Rakuga Kingdom and Almost Four Heroes	Shin-Ei Animation	Takahiko Kyogoku	103	
September 11	The Magnificent Kotobuki Complete Edition	GEMBA	Tsutomu Mizushima	119	
September 11	The Stranger by the Shore	Studio Hibari	Akiyo Ohashi	59	
September 18	Love Me, Love Me Not	A-1 Pictures	Toshimasa Kuroyanagi	103	
September 18	Violet Evergarden: The Movie	Kyoto Animation	Taichi Ishidate	140	
October 2	BEM: Become Human	Production I.G	Hiroshi Ikehata	90	
October 2	Burn the Witch	Studio Colorido	Tatsuro Kawano	63	
October 2 – October 30	Wave!!: Let's Go Surfing!!	Asahi Production	Takaharu Ozaki	261	
October 16	Demon Slayer: Kimetsu no Yaiba the Movie: Mugen Train	Ufotable	Haruo Sotozaki	117	
October 23	Happy-Go-Lucky Days	Liden Films Kyoto Studio	Takuya Satō	54	
November 6	Monster Strike the Movie: Lucifer - Zetsubō no Yoake	Anima; Dynamo Pictures	Kōbun Shizuno	127	
November 13	Date A Bullet: Nightmare or Queen	Geek Toys	Jun Nakagawa	29	
November 13	Looking for Magical Doremi	Toei Animation	Junichi Sato; Haruka Kamatani	91	
November 20	Stand by Me Doraemon 2	Shirogumi; Shin-Ei Animation	Ryuichi Yagi; Takashi Yamazaki	96	
November 27	Grisaia: Phantom Trigger the Animation Stargazer	Bibury Animation Studios	Tensho	60	
November 27	Over the Sky	Digital Network Animation	Yoshinobu Sena	95	
December 5	Fate/Grand Order: Camelot - Wandering; Agaterám	Signal.MD	Kei Suezawa	90	
December 11	Yes, No, or Maybe?	Lesprit	Masahiro Takata	53	
December 25	Josee, the Tiger and the Fish	Bones	Kotaro Tamura	98	
December 25	Pokémon the Movie: Secrets of the Jungle	OLM	Tetsuo Yajima	110	
December 25	Poupelle of Chimney Town	Studio 4°C	Yusuke Hirota	101	
December 30	Earwig and the Witch	Studio Ghibli	Gorō Miyazaki	82	

=== Television series ===
A list of anime television series that debuted between January 1 and December 31, 2020.

First run start and end dates	Title	Episodes	Studio	Director(s)	Original title	Ref
January 3 – March 27	Asteroid in Love	12	Doga Kobo	Daisuke Hiramaki	Koisuru Asteroid	
January 3 – March 20	Darwin's Game	11	Nexus	Yoshinobu Tokumoto	Dāwinzu Gēmu	
January 4 – March 28	Magia Record: Puella Magi Madoka Magica Side Story	13	Shaft	Gekidan Inu Curry (Doroinu)	Magia Record: Mahō Shōjo Madoka Magika Gaiden	
January 5 – March 22	Id: Invaded	13	NAZ	Ei Aoki		
January 5 – March 22	Keep Your Hands Off Eizouken!	12	Science SARU	Masaaki Yuasa	Eizouken ni wa Te o Dasu na!	
January 5 – June 30, 2021	Rebirth	50	Liden Films Osaka Studio	Shinobu Yoshioka		
January 5 – March 22	Yatogame-chan Kansatsu Nikki (season 2)	12	Saetta	Hisayoshi Hirasawa	Yatogame-chan Kansatsu Nikki 2 Satsume	
January 6 – March 23	Room Camp	12	C-Station	Masato Jinbo	Heya Kyan	
January 6 – March 30	Pet	13	Geno Studio	Takahiro Omori	Petto	
January 7 – March 24	Seton Academy: Join the Pack!	12	Studio Gokumi	Hiroshi Ikehata	Murenase! Seton Gakuen	
January 7 – March 31	Sorcerous Stabber Orphen	13	Studio Deen	Takayuki Hamana	Majutsushi Orphen Haguretabi	
January 8 – March 25	Bofuri	12	Silver Link	Shin Ōnuma; Mirai Minato	Itai no wa Iya nano de Bōgyoryoku ni Kyokufuri Shitai to Omoimasu.	
January 8 – March 25	Hulaing Babies☆Petit	12	Gaina	Yoshinori Asao		
January 8 – April 15	number24	12	PRA	Shigeru Kimiya		
January 8 – June 24	Plunderer	24	Geek Toys	Hiroyuki Kanbe	Purandara	
January 9 – March 26	Drifting Dragons	12	Polygon Pictures	Tadahiro Yoshihira	Kūtei Doragonzu	
January 9 – June 3	Hatena Illusion	12	Children's Playground Entertainment	Shin Matsuo	Hatena☆Iryūjon	
January 9 – March 26	If My Favorite Pop Idol Made It to the Budokan, I Would Die	12	Eight Bit	Yusuke Yamamoto	Oshi ga Budōkan Ittekuretara Shinu	
January 9 – April 16	Infinite Dendrogram	13	NAZ	Tomoki Kobayashi	Infinitto Dendoroguramu	
January 9 – March 26	Nekopara	12	Felix Film	Yasutaka Yamamoto		
January 9 – March 26	Show by Rock!! Mashumairesh!!	12	Kinema Citrus	Seung Hui Son		
January 9 – March 26	Somali and the Forest Spirit	12	Satelight; Hornets	Kenji Yasuda	Somari to Mori no Kamisama	
January 9 – March 26	The Case Files of Jeweler Richard	12	Shuka	Tarou Iwasaki	Hōsekisho Richard-shi no Nazo Kantei	
January 9 – March 26	Toilet-Bound Hanako-kun	12	Lerche	Masaomi Andō	Jibaku Shōnen Hanako-kun	
January 9 – March 19	Uchitama?! Have you seen my Tama?	11	MAPPA; Lapin Track	Kiyoshi Matsuda	Uchi Tama!? ~Uchi no Tama Shirimasen ka?~	
January 10 – September 25	A Certain Scientific Railgun T	25	J.C.Staff	Tatsuyuki Nagai	Toaru Kagaku no Rērugan T	
January 10 – April 3	Haikyu!! To The Top	13	Production I.G	Masako Sato		
January 10 – March 27	Oda Cinnamon Nobunaga	12	Studio Signpost	Hidetoshi Takahashi	Oda Shinamon Nobunaga	
January 10 – March 13	Science Fell in Love, So I Tried to Prove It	12	Zero-G	Tōru Kitahata	Rikei ga Koi ni Ochita no de Shōmei Shite Mita	
January 10 – March 27	Smile Down the Runway	12	Ezo'la	Nobuyoshi Nagayama	Runway de Waratte	
January 11 – March 28	22/7	12	A-1 Pictures	Takao Abo	Nanabun no Nijūni	
January 11 – March 28	A Destructive God Sits Next to Me	12	EMT Squared	Atsushi Nigorikawa	Boku no Tonari ni Ankoku Hakaishin ga Imasu.	
January 11 – March 28	Interspecies Reviewers	12	Passione	Yuki Ogawa	Ishuzoku Rebyuāzu	
January 11 – March 28	In/Spectre	12	Brain's Base	Keiji Gotoh	Kyokō Suiri	
January 12 – March 29	Dorohedoro	12	MAPPA	Yuichiro Hayashi		
January 13 – March 23	ARP Backstage Pass	11	Dynamo Pictures	Tetsuya Endo		
January 14 – June 23	A3! Season Spring & Summer	12	P.A. Works; 3Hz	Masayuki Sakoi; Keisuke Shinohara		
January 14 – March 31	Isekai Quartet (season 2)	12	Studio Puyukai	Minoru Ashina		
January 23 – April 23	BanG Dream! (season 3)	13	Sanzigen	Kōdai Kakimoto		
February 2 – February 21, 2021	Healin' Good Pretty Cure	45	Toei Animation	Yoko Ikeda	Hīrin Guddo Purikyua	
April 1 – June 17	Tamayomi	12	Studio A-Cat	Toshinori Fukushima		
April 1 – June 24	Tower of God	13	Telecom Animation Film	Takashi Sano	Kami no Tō	
April 2 – March 24, 2022	Auto Boy - Carl from Mobile Land	104	CloverWorks	Shinobu Sasaki	Norimono Man Mōbiru Rando no Kā-kun	
April 2 – June 18	The 8th Son? Are You Kidding Me?	12	Shin-Ei Animation	Tatsuo Miura	Hachinan tte, Sore wa Nai Deshō!	
April 2 – June 18	Kakushigoto	12	Ajia-do Animation Works	Yūta Murano		
April 3 – August 7	Bungo and Alchemist: Gears of Judgement	13	OLM	Toshinori Watanabe	Bungō to Alchemist ~Shinpan no Haguruma~	
April 3 – June 19	Listeners	12	MAPPA	Hiroaki Ando	Risunāzu	
April 3 – June 19	Sakura Wars the Animation	12	Sanzigen	Manabu Ono	Shin Sakura Taisen The Animation	
April 3 – June 19	Wave, Listen to Me!	12	Sunrise	Tatsuma Minamikawa	Nami yo Kiitekure	
April 4 – June 20	Arte	12	Seven Arcs	Takayuki Hamana	Arute	
April 4 – November 7	Major 2nd (season 2)	25	OLM	Ayumu Watanabe		
April 4 – June 20	My Next Life as a Villainess: All Routes Lead to Doom!	12	Silver Link	Keisuke Inoue	Otome Gēmu no Hametsu Furagu Shika Nai Akuyaku Reijō ni Tensei Shiteshimatta...	
April 4 – June 20	Sing "Yesterday" for Me	12	Doga Kobo	Yoshiyuki Fujiwara	Yesterday o Utatte	
April 5 – June 21	Ascendance of a Bookworm (season 2)	12	Ajia-do Animation Works	Mitsuru Hongo	Honzuki no Gekokujō: Shisho ni Naru Tame niwa Shudan o Erandeiraremasen	
April 5 – June 28	Gleipnir	13	Pine Jam	Kazuhiro Yoneda	Gureipuniru	
April 5 – December 27	Idolish7: Second Beat!	15	Troyca	Makoto Bessho		
April 5 – April 4, 2021	Mewkledreamy	48	J.C.Staff	Hiroaki Sakurai	Myūkurudorīmī	
April 5 – November 8	Motto! Majime ni Fumajime Kaiketsu Zorori (season 1)	25	Ajia-do Animation Works; Bandai Namco Pictures	Takahide Ogata		
April 5 – December 20	My Roomie Is a Dino	12	Space Neko Company; Kamikaze Douga	Jun Aoki	Gal to Kyōryū	
April 5 – June 28	Shachibato! President, It's Time for Battle!	12	C2C	Hiroki Ikeshita	Shachō, Batoru no Jikan Desu!	
April 5 – March 28, 2021	Tomica Kizuna Mode Combine Earth Granner	51	OLM, Inc.	Shinji Ushiro	Tomika Kizuna Gattai Āsu Gurannā	
April 5 – June 21	Tsugu Tsugumomo	12	Zero-G	Ryōichi Kuraya		
April 6 – June 15	Dropkick on My Devil!! Dash	11	Nomad	Hikaru Sato	Jashin-chan Dropkick Dash	
April 6 – September 21	Fruits Basket (season 2)	25	TMS/8PAN	Yoshihide Ibata		
April 6 – March 29, 2021	GaruGaku: Saint Girls Square Academy	50	OLM; Wit Studio	Hiroaki Akagi (Chief); Norihito Takahashi	GaruGaku: Sei Gāruzu Sukueia Gakuin	
April 6 – October 18, 2021	Kingdom (season 3)	26	Pierrot; Studio Signpost	Kenichi Imaizumi		
April 6 – June 29	Princess Connect! Re:Dive	13	CygamesPictures	Takaomi Kanasaki		
April 6 – June 22	White Cat Project: Zero Chronicle	12	Project No.9	Masato Jinbo	Shironeko Project: Zero Chronicle	
April 7 – September 22	Diary of Our Days at the Breakwater	12	Doga Kobo	Takaharu Okuma	Hōkago Teibō Nisshi	
April 7 – March 23, 2021	Shadowverse	48	Zexcs	Keiichiro Kawaguchi	Shadoubāsu	
April 8 – June 24	BNA: Brand New Animal	12	Trigger	Yoh Yoshinari	Bī Enu Ē	
April 8 – July 1	Komatta Jii-san	13	Kachidoki Studio	Hiroshi Namiki		
April 9 – September 24	The Millionaire Detective Balance: Unlimited	11	CloverWorks	Tomohiko Itō	Fugō Keiji Balance: Unlimited	
April 10 – September 25	Appare-Ranman!	13	P.A. Works	Masakazu Hashimoto		
April 10 – July 3	Argonavis from BanG Dream!	13	Sanzigen	Hiroshi Nishikiori	Arugonabisu from BanG Dream!	
April 11 – September 26	Food Wars! Shokugeki no Soma: The Fifth Plate	13	J.C.Staff	Yoshitomo Yonetani	Shokugeki no Sōma: Go no Sara	
April 11 – June 27	Kaguya-sama: Love Is War?	12	A-1 Pictures	Mamoru Hatakeyama	Kaguya-sama wa Kokurasetai - Tensai-tachi no Ren'ai Zunōsen?	
April 13 – June 29	Woodpecker Detective's Office	12	Liden Films	Shinpei Ezaki (Chief); Tomoe Makino	Kitsutsuki Tantei-dokoro	
April 20 – November 2	Bessatsu Olympia Kyklos	24	Gosay Studio	Ryō Fujii	Bessatsu Orinpia kyukurosu	
July 4 – December 12	Fire Force (season 2)	24	David Production	Tatsuma Minamikawa	En'en no Shōbōtai	
July 4 – September 19	Lapis Re:Lights	12	Yokohama Animation Laboratory	Hiroyuki Hata	Rapisu Riraitsu: Kono Sekai no Idol wa Mahō ga Tsukaeru	
July 4 – September 26	Super HxEros	12	Project No.9	Masato Jinbo	Dokyū Hentai HxEros	
July 4 – September 26	The Misfit of Demon King Academy	13	Silver Link	Shin Ōnuma (Chief); Masafumi Tamura	Maō Gakuin no Futekigōsha	
July 6 – September 28	The God of High School	13	MAPPA	Sunghoo Park		
July 7 – September 22	Muhyo & Roji's Bureau of Supernatural Investigation (season 2)	12	Studio Deen	Nobuhiro Kondo	Muhyo to Rōjī no Mahōritsu Sōdan Jimusho	
July 7 – September 22	Umayon	12	DMM.futureworks; W-Toon Studio	Seiya Miyajima		
July 8 – September 23	Deca-Dence	12	NUT	Yuzuru Tachikawa	Dekadansu	
July 8 – December 16	Great Pretender	23	Wit Studio	Hiro Kaburagi		
July 8 – September 30	Re:Zero − Starting Life in Another World (season 2, part 1)	13	White Fox	Masaharu Watanabe	Re:Zero kara Hajimeru Isekai Seikatsu	
July 9 – September 24	My Teen Romantic Comedy SNAFU Climax	12	Feel	Kei Oikawa	Yahari Ore no Seishun Rabukome wa Machigatteiru. Kan	
July 9 – September 24	No Guns Life (season 2)	12	Madhouse	Naoyuki Itō		
July 10 – September 11	Get Up! Get Live!	10	Spellbound	88		
July 10 – September 25	Uzaki-chan Wants to Hang Out!	12	ENGI	Kazuya Miura	Uzaki-chan wa Asobitai!	
July 11 – September 26	Peter Grill and the Philosopher's Time	12	Wolfsbane	Tatsumi	Peter Grill to Kenja no Jikan	
July 11 – September 26	Rent-A-Girlfriend	12	TMS Entertainment	Kazuomi Koga	Kanojo, Okarishimasu	
July 12 – September 27	Monster Girl Doctor	12	Arvo Animation	Yoshiaki Iwasaki	Monsutā Musume no Oisha-san	
July 12 – September 20	Sword Art Online: Alicization – War of Underworld (part 2)	11	A-1 Pictures	Manabu Ono		
July 15 – September 30	Gibiate	12	Lunch Box; Studio Elle	Masahiko Komino	Jibiēto	
July 15 – September 30	Mr Love: Queen's Choice	12	MAPPA	Munehisa Sakai	Koi to Producer: EVOL×LOVE	
October 1 – March 19, 2021	Higurashi: When They Cry – Gou	24	Passione	Keiichiro Kawaguchi	Higurashi no Naku Koro ni Gou	
October 2 – December 25	Assault Lily Bouquet	12	Shaft	Hajime Ootani (Chief); Shouji Saeki	Asaruto Rirī Būke	
October 2 – December 18	I'm Standing on a Million Lives	12	Maho Film	Kumiko Habara	100-Man no Inochi no Ue ni Ore wa Tatteiru	
October 2 – December 18	Rail Romanesque	12	Saetta	Hisayoshi Hirasawa	Reeru Romanesuku	
October 2 – December 18	Haikyu!! To The Top (season 2)	12	Production I.G	Masako Sato		
October 2 – December 18	Wandering Witch: The Journey of Elaina	12	C2C	Toshiyuki Kubooka	Majo no Tabitabi	
October 2 – March 26, 2021	With a Dog AND a Cat, Every Day is Fun	24	Team Till Dawn	Seiji Kishi	Inu to Neko Docchimo Katteru to Mainichi Tanoshii	
October 3 – October 22, 2022	Dragon Quest: The Adventure of Dai	100	Toei Animation	Kazuya Karasawa	Dragon Quest: Dai no Daibōken	
October 3 – December 19	Fly Me to the Moon	12	Seven Arcs	Hiroshi Ikehata	Tonikaku Kawaii	
October 3 – December 26	Hypnosis Mic: Division Rap Battle: Rhyme Anima	13	A-1 Pictures	Katsumi Ono	Hipunoshisu Maiku: Division Rap Battle: Rhyme Anima	
October 3 – December 19	Is It Wrong to Try to Pick Up Girls in a Dungeon? (season 3)	12	J.C.Staff	Hideki Tachibana	Dungeon ni Deai o Motomeru no wa Machigatteiru Darō ka?	
October 3 – March 27, 2021	Jujutsu Kaisen	24	MAPPA	Sunghoo Park		
October 3 – March 27, 2021	King's Raid: Successors of the Will	26	OLM; Sunrise Beyond	Makoto Hoshino	King's Raid: Ishi o Tsugu Mono-tachi	
October 3 – December 26	Love Live! Nijigasaki High School Idol Club	13	Sunrise	Tomoyuki Kawamura	Love Live! Nijigasaki Gakuen Sukūru Aidoru Dōkō-kai	
October 3 – December 26	Warlords of Sigrdrifa	12	A-1 Pictures	Hirotaka Tokuda	Senyoku no Sigrdrifa	
October 3 – March 20, 2021	Yashahime: Princess Half-Demon	24	Sunrise	Teruo Sato	Hanyō no Yashahime	
October 4 – December 20	By the Grace of the Gods	12	Maho Film	Takeyuki Yanase	Kamitachi ni Hirowareta Otako	
October 4 – December 20	Iwa-Kakeru! Sport Climbing Girls	12	Blade	Tetsurō Amino		
October 4 – December 27	Talentless Nana	13	Bridge	Shinji Ishihira	Munō na Nana	
October 4 – December 27	The Irregular at Magic High School: Visitor Arc	13	Eight Bit	Risako Yoshida	Mahōka Kōkō no Rettōsei: Raihōsha-hen	
October 5 – December 21	Golden Kamuy (season 3)	12	Geno Studio	Hitoshi Nanba		
October 5 – December 21	One Room (season 3)	12	Zero-G	Shinichirō Ueda		
October 6 – December 22	Ikebukuro West Gate Park	12	Doga Kobo	Tomoaki Koshida		
October 6 – December 22	Sleepy Princess in the Demon Castle	12	Doga Kobo	Mitsue Yamazaki	Maōjō de Oyasumi	
October 7 – December 23	Kuma Kuma Kuma Bear	12	EMT Squared	Hisashi Ishii; Yuu Nobuta	Kuma Kuma Kuma Beā	
October 7 – December 30	Noblesse	13	Production I.G	Shunsuke Tada (Chief); Yasutaka Yamamoto		
October 7 – December 23	Our Last Crusade or the Rise of a New World	12	Silver Link	Shin Ōnuma; Mirai Minato	Kimi to Boku no Saigo no Senjō, Arui wa Sekai ga Hajimaru Seisen	
October 7 – December 23	Strike Witches: Road to Berlin	12	David Production	Hideya Takahashi; Kazuhiro Takamura	Dai-501 Tōgō Sentō Kōkū-dan Strike Witches: Road to Berlin	
October 7 – December 30	Tsukiuta. THE ANIMATION (season 2)	13	Children's Playground Entertainment	Yukio Nishimoto		
October 8 – December 24	Akudama Drive	12	Pierrot	Tomohisa Taguchi	Akudama Doraibu	
October 8 – December 24	Grand Blues!	12	DMM.futureworks	Kenshirō Morii	Guraburu!	
October 9 – December 25	Adachi and Shimamura	12	Tezuka Productions	Satoshi Kuwabara	Adachi to Shimamura	
October 10 – December 26	Is the Order a Rabbit? BLOOM	12	Encourage Films	Hiroyuki Hashimoto	Gochūmon wa Usagi Desu ka? BLOOM	
October 11 – December 27	Maesetsu!	12	Studio Gokumi; AXsiZ	Yuu Nobuta		
October 11 – December 20	Moriarty the Patriot (part 1)	11	Production I.G	Kazuya Nomura	Yūkoku no Moriāti	
October 11 – December 27	The Day I Became a God	12	P.A. Works	Yoshiyuki Asai	Kami-sama ni Natta Hi	
October 11 – December 20	The Gymnastics Samurai	11	MAPPA	Hisatoshi Shimizu	Taiso Samurai	
October 12 – December 28	Dropout Idol Fruit Tart	12	Feel	Keiichiro Kawaguchi	Ochikobore Fruit Tart	
October 13 – December 29	A3! Season Autumn & Winter	12	P.A. Works; 3Hz	Masayuki Sakoi		
October 13 – December 29	Magatsu Wahrheit -Zuerst-	12	Yokohama Animation Laboratory	Naoto Hosoda		
October 13 – March 30, 2021	Mr. Osomatsu (season 3)	25	Pierrot	Yoichi Fujita	Osomatsu-san	
October 14 – December 30	Dogeza: I Tried Asking While Kowtowing	12	Adonero	Shinpei Nagai	Dogeza de Tanondemita	
October 30 – January 29, 2021	D4DJ First Mix	13	Sanzigen	Seiji Mizushima		
December 7 – March 29, 2021	Attack on Titan: The Final Season (part 1)	16	MAPPA	Jun Shishido (Chief); Yūichirō Hayashi	Shingeki no Kyojin: The Final Season	

=== Original net animations ===
A list of original net animations that debuted between January 1 and December 31, 2020.

First run start and end dates	Title	Episodes	Studio	Director(s)	Original title	Ref
January 15 – August 6	Pokémon: Twilight Wings	7	Studio Colorido	Shingo Yamashita	Poketto Monsutā Hakumei no Tsubasa	
February 6	Cagaster of an Insect Cage	12	Studio Kai	Koichi Chigira	Mushikago no Cagaster	
March 19	Altered Carbon: Resleeved	1	Anima	Takeru Nakajima; Yoshiyuki Okada	Orutādo kābon: Risurībudo	
March 20	Dino Girl Gauko (season 2)	19	Ascension	Akira Shigino	Kyōryū Shōjo Gauko	
March 23	Sol Levante	1	Production I.G	Akira Saitoh		
March 26	7 Seeds (season 2)	12	Studio Kai	Yukio Takahashi		
April 3 – March 19, 2021	Beyblade Burst Surge	52	OLM, Inc.	Jin Gu O	Beiburēdo Bāsuto Supākingu	
April 9 – August 27	Gundam Build Divers Re:Rise (season 2)	13	Sunrise Beyond	Shinya Watada		
April 10 – November 20	Mashin Eiyūden Wataru Shichi Tamashii no Ryūjinmaru	9	Sunrise	Hiroshi Kōjina		
April 10 – June 26	The House Spirit Tatami-chan	12	Zero-G	Rensuke Oshikiri	Zashiki-Warashi no Tatami-chan	
April 23	Ghost in the Shell: SAC_2045 (season 1)	12	Production I.G; Sola Digital Arts	Kenji Kamiyama; Shinji Aramaki		
June 4	Baki (season 2)	13	TMS Entertainment	Toshiki Hirano		
June 18	A Whisker Away	1	Studio Colorido	Junichi Sato; Tomotaka Shibayama	Nakitai Watashi wa Neko o Kaburu	
July 9	Japan Sinks: 2020	10	Science SARU	Pyeon-Gang Ho; Masaaki Yuasa	Nihon Chinbotsu 2020	
August 16	My Hero Academia: Make It! Do-or-Die Survival Training	2	Bones	Kenji Nagasaki (Chief); Masahiro Mukai	Boku no Hero Academia: Ikinokore! Kesshi no Survival Kunren	
August 27	Aggretsuko (season 3)	10	Fanworks	Rarecho		
September 17	Dragon's Dogma	7	Sublimation	Shin'ya Sugai	Doragonzu doguma	
October 11	Bōkyaku Battery	1	MAPPA	Parako Shinohara		
October 11 –	Onegai Patron-sama!		TANOsim			
December 1	Obsolete (part 2)	6	Buemon	Hiroki Yamada; Seiichi Shirato		

=== Original video animations ===
A list of original video animations that debuted between January 1 and December 31, 2020.

First run start and end dates	Title	Episodes	Studio	Director(s)	Original title	Ref
January 22	Haikyu!! Land vs. Sky	2	Production I.G	Susumu Mitsunaka	Haikyu!!: Riku vs. Kū	
January 22	Tsugumomo	1	Zero-G	Ryōichi Kuraya		
January 29	Is It Wrong to Try to Pick Up Girls in a Dungeon?	1	J.C.Staff	Hideki Tachibana	Dungeon ni Deai o Motomeru no wa Machigatteiru Darō ka?	
January 29	Strike the Blood: Kieta Seisō-hen	1	Connect	Hideyo Yamamoto		
February 14	ACCA: 13-Territory Inspection Dept. - Regards	1	Madhouse	Shingo Natsume	ACCA 13-Ku Kansatsu-Ka Regards	
February 27	The Ones Within	1	Silver Link	Shin Ōnuma	Naka no Hito Genome [Jikkyōchū]	
February 28	Queen's Blade: Unlimited (2nd OVA)	1	FORTES	Gabi Kisaragi		
February 27	Ascendance of a Bookworm	2	Ajia-do Animation Works	Mitsuru Hongo	Honzuki no Gekokujō: Shisho ni Naru Tame niwa Shudan o Erandeiraremasen	
March 25	Do You Love Your Mom and Her Two-Hit Multi-Target Attacks?	1	J.C.Staff	Yoshiaki Iwasaki	Tsūjou Kōgeki ga Zentai Kōgeki de ni Kai Kōgeki no Okā-san wa Suki Desuka?	
April 3	We Never Learn: BOKUBEN	1	Studio Silver; Arvo Animation	Yoshiaki Iwasaki	Bokutachi wa Benkyō ga Dekinai	
April 8 – June 30, 2021	Strike the Blood IV	12	Connect	Hideyo Yamamoto	Sutoraiku za Buraddo IV	
August 26	Case File nº221: Kabukicho	6	Production I.G	Ai Yoshimura	Kabukichō Sherlock	
September 2	Oresuki	1	Connect	Noriaki Akitaya	Ore o Suki nano wa Omae dake kayo	
October 25 – November 29	Katana Maidens – Tomoshibi	2	Project No.9	Tomohiro Kamitani	Toji no Miko: Kizamishi Issen no Tomoshibi	

== Deaths ==
=== January ===
- January 9: Yūji Yamaguchi, Japanese animator (Fate/stay night), dies at age 58 (death announced on this date).

=== February ===
- February 13: Yoshisada Sakaguchi, Japanese voice actor (Hachiroh Tohbe in Jin-Roh: The Wolf Brigade, Tonpetty in JoJo's Bizarre Adventure: Phantom Blood, Muijika in Mushishi, Philip II of Macedon in Reign), dies at age 80.
- February 21: Hisashi Katsuta, Japanese voice actor (Professor Ochanomizu in Astro Boy, Dr. Hoshi in Astroganger, Professor Tobishima in Groizer X, Shin'ichirō Izumi in Tōshō Daimos, dies from senility at age 92.
- February 22: Kazuhiko Kishino, Japanese voice actor (voice of Mayumi Kinniku in Kinnikuman), dies from acute heart failure at age 86.
- February 29: Luis Alfonso Mendoza, Mexican voice dub actor (Latin American voice dub of teenage and adult Gohan in Dragon Ball Z and Dragon Ball GT, Leonardo in Teenage Mutant Ninja Turtles), is murdered at age 55.

=== April ===
- April 12: Keiji Fujiwara, Japanese voice actor (Ladd Russo in Baccano, Hiroshi Nohara in Crayon Shin-chan, Maes Hughes in Fullmetal Alchemist, Leorio Paladiknight in Hunter x Hunter), dies of cancer at age 55.
- April 23: Kumiko Okae, Japanese actress (Voice of Naoko Yoshioka in The Cat Returns), dies from pneumonia at age 63.

=== November ===
- November 4: Sergio Matteucci, Italian voice actor and radio presenter (narrator in Dastardly and Muttley in Their Flying Machines, Italian dub voice of Saiyan B in Dragon Ball Z), dies at age 89.
- November 15: Hikari Yono, Japanese voice actress (Naruto: Shippuden, Sailor Moon Crystal), dies at age 46.
- November 18:
  - Kirby Morrow, Canadian voice actor, writer and comedian (American dub voice of Teru Mikami in Death Note, Goku in Ocean's dub of Dragon Ball Z (from Episode 160 onwards), Van Fanel in the Ocean dub of Escaflowne, Miroku in InuYasha, Trowa Barton in Mobile Suit Gundam Wing, Ryo Takatsuki in Project ARMS), dies from complications of substance abuse at age 47.
  - Jonas Rodrigues de Mello, Brazilian actor (voice of Shadowseat in Cassiopeia, Brazilian dub voice of various villains in Dragon Ball Z, Brazilian dub voice of Rataxes in The Adventures of Babar, Montanha in The Happy Cricket and the Giant Bugs), dies at age 83.
- November 30: Enrico Bertorelli, Italian actor and voice actor (Italian dub voice of Cell and Commander Red in Dragon Ball Z, Commissioner James Gordon in Batman: The Animated Series), dies at age 78.

== See also ==
- 2020 in Japanese television
- 2020 in animation
