= Flexible silicon =

Flexible piece of mono-crystalline silicon

Flexible silicon refers to a flexible piece of mono-crystalline silicon. Several processes have been demonstrated in the literature for obtaining flexible silicon from single crystal silicon wafers (either before or after fabrication of CMOS circuits).

== Background ==
According to beam theory and the 3-point test of a rectangular beam of an isotropic linear material, a perpendicular specific force applied to a rectangular beam would cause it to deflect as a function of its dimension parameters and material properties (i.e., flexural modulus). All parameters are fixed, and the dependence of the deflection on thickness is inversely proportional, i.e., the thinner the beam, the more it deflects when the same force is applied. Simplistically, the applied force per unit area is the stress experienced by the beam. For two beams made of similar materials, but one is thinner than the other, a lower force (stress) is required to achieve the same deflection in the thinner beam. This opens up the possibility of reducing a beam's thickness to adjust the magnitude of stress it can handle before physically breaking if the deflection requirement is the same. Applying this concept to the commonly used brittle Monocrystalline silicon (100) substrates, it can achieve some flexibility (note that silicon is an anisotropic material and requires dealing with an elasticity matrix, a tensor, not a simple value for flexural modulus). This is done using various micro-fabrication techniques and novel approaches to reduce the silicon substrate thickness to a few to tens of micrometers, enabling bending up to 0.5 cm radius without breaking.

== Processes ==
Etch protect release approach and backside etch are a few examples of how this can be achieved. These techniques have been extensively used to demonstrate flexible versions of traditional high-performance CMOS-compatible devices, including 3D fin-field effect transistors (finFETs) and planar metal–oxide–semiconductor FETs (MOSFETs), metal-oxide-semiconductor/metal-insulator-metal capacitors (MOSCAPs and MIMCAPs), ferroelectric capacitors and resistive devices, and thermoelectric generators (TEGs).
