= Vampires in Havana =

¡Vampiros en La Habana! Vampires in Havana
- DVD cover
- Directed by: Juan Padrón
- Written by: Ernesto Padrón; Juan Padrón
- Produced by: Paco Prats
- Starring: Frank González; Manuel Marín; Irela Bravo; Carlos González; Mirella Guillot; Carmen Solar; Juan Padrón
- Cinematography: Hector Borroto; Jose L. Rodríguez; Ramón Palenzuela
- Edited by: Manuel Marín; Margarita Aguero; Frank González
- Music by: Rembert Egues
- Animation by: Jorge Jardón; Dalia Vázquez; Gabriel Ramos; Miguel Villanueva; Jorge V. Torres
- Backgrounds by: Leonardo Cano; Erilda Negret
- Production companies: Instituto Cubano del Arte e Industria Cinematográficos; Manfred Durniok Produktion für Film und Fernsehen; Televisión Española
- Distributed by: Instituto Cubano del Arte e Industria Cinematográficos
- Release date: 1985
- Running time: 80 minutes
- Countries: Cuba; Spain; West Germany
- Language: Spanish

Vampires in Havana (Spanish: ¡Vampiros en La Habana!) is a 1985 Cuban Spanish-language adult animated comedy horror film directed by Juan Padrón and features trumpet performances by Arturo Sandoval. It is an international co-production of Cuba, Spain and West Germany.

The film is set in Havana during the 1930s. A local musician and aspiring terrorist in Cuba is unaware of his actual nature as a day walking vampire. He is apparently Count Dracula's grandson, and has served as an unwilling test subject for the experiments of one of Dracula's sons. The musician finds himself targeted by both an American crime syndicate from Chicago, and by a multinational group of European vampires. He desperately tries to escape their manhunt.

A sequel to the film, called Más vampiros en La Habana (English title: More Vampires in Havana!), was released in 2003.

== Plot ==
Joseph Amadeus von Dracula, known as Pepe or Pepito to his friends, is a trumpet player in 1930s Havana. He spends his time away from the bandstand dabbling in quasi-terrorist plots to overthrow the Cuban government of Gerardo Machado. Von Dracula is unaware that he is really a vampire, and that his uncle Werner Amadeus von Dracula, the son of Count Dracula, has been using him as a test subject for a formula that negates the usually fatal effects of sunlight.

A Chicago-based crime syndicate and a group of vampires with members from several countries in Europe have both learned of the formula and wish to possess it for different reasons—the Chicago group to suppress it and thus maintain their monopoly on indoor, artificial beach resorts, and the Europeans to market it as "Vampisol." When Pepe learns of his true heritage (and his uncle's wish to give the formula away to vampires everywhere) he becomes the target of a multi-pronged manhunt, leading all parties involved on a wild chase through some of the seediest neighborhoods of Havana.

At the film's climax, Pepe and his girlfriend Lola find themselves cornered by the Chicago vampire cartel, led by vampire mobster Johnny Terrori. He tells Pepe to have some O positive blood as his last drink, the blood type which vampires consider to be the most delicious. However, when he spits it out in disgust, Terrori realizes that Pepe's dislike of drinking blood, the fact that he was harmed by a lead bullet earlier (vampires can only be harmed by silver bullets), and that he is completely impervious to sunlight (it instantly kills vampires) means that Pepe has stopped being a vampire.

Terrori loses interest in the Vampisol formula, realizing that its effect is to turn vampires into humans. However, the leader of the European vampires suggests a deal with his counterparts from Chicago, whereby they can encourage vampires to take small amounts of Vampisol in the summer and visit the mobsters' artificial beaches in the winter. Both groups believe that they are going to make a fortune from Vampisol but, as a final resolution, Pepe sings instructions on how to prepare the formula over the radio to vampires worldwide, instructing them to use it sparingly to avoid becoming human. The Vampisol formula becomes financially worthless and both vampire cartels find themselves defeated.

At the very end of the film, a vampire addresses the audience and says, "Be careful, because that guy next to you on the beach... might just be a vampire!"

== Voice cast ==
- Frank González as Joseph Amadeus von Dracula (Pepito), Smiley, Al Tapone
- Manuel Marín as Johnny Terrori, Black Vampire
- Irela Bravo as Lola
- Carlos González as Uncle Werner Amadeus Von Dracula

== See also ==
- List of Cuban films
