= Back to Back (TV series) =

Russian animated children's television series

- Also known as: Back to Back: backpack adventures (Season 2)
- Genre: Adventure; Comedy
- Directed by: Viktoria Tyrtyshnaya
- Voices of: Laurie Hymes; Alyson Leigh Rosenfeld; Emily Cramer; Matt Braver; Tom Aglio; Samantha Cooper; Robb Moreira; Marc Thompson; Bill Timoney; Tom Wayland; Simona Berman
- Music by: Andrey Tkachuk
- Composers: Konstantin Bezdudny; Yuriy Polukov
- Country of origin: Russia
- Original language: Russian
- No. of seasons: 2
- No. of episodes: 52

Production
- Executive producer: Ilya Kuznetsov
- Running time: 6 minutes
- Production company: Mechtalet Studios

Original release
- Network: Multilandia; Karusel
- Release: December 14, 2020 – present

Back to Back (Russian: Спина к спине) is a Russian animated children's television series produced by Mechtalet Studios, that airs on Karusel.

== Episodes ==
Season	Episodes	Originally aired	
Season	Episodes	First released	Last released
1	26	November 27, 2020	September 16, 2021
2	26	August 13, 2023	September 8, 2024

== Trivia ==
There were plans to distribute the show to Indonesia, Cambodia, Singapore, Japan, and South Korea. It has also been noted that "inhabitants of North Korea and Moldova have fallen in love with the show".
