= Chico Bon Bon: Monkey with a Tool Belt =

2020 American children's animated TV series

- Genre: Children's
- Based on: Chico Bon Bon: Monkey with a Tool Belt by Chris Monroe
- Developed by: Bob Boyle; Michael J. Goldberg; Kurt Mueller; Gabe Pulliam
- Written by: Gabe Pulliam; Michael Goldberg
- Directed by: Darragh O'Connell
- Voices of: Robbie Daymond; Dayci Brookshire; Anthony Tedesco
- Theme music composer: Mike Reagan
- Composer: Mike Reagan
- Country of origin: United States
- Original language: English
- No. of seasons: 4
- No. of episodes: 38 (+ 1 special)

Production
- Executive producers: Bob Boyle; Kurt Mueller; Darragh O'Connell; Cathal Gaffney
- Producers: Laurie Rabin; Bryan Korn; Rachel Simon; Geraldine Weber
- Running time: 14 minutes
- Production company: Silvergate Media (Note: Animation by Brown Bag Films)

Original release
- Network: Netflix
- Release: May 8 – December 4, 2020

Chico Bon Bon: Monkey with a Tool Belt is an American animated children's television series based on a series of books of the same name by Chris Monroe. The series is set in Blunderburg and revolves around Chico Bon Bon (voice of Robbie Daymond) and his friends Clark the elephant, Rainbow Thunder the daredevil cat and Tiny the mouse trying to solve problems using STEM concepts. Produced by Silvergate Media (as its first television series following its acquisition by Sony Pictures Television in 2019) and animated by Brown Bag Films, the series premiered on May 8, 2020 on Netflix. A holiday special Chico Bon Bon and the Very Berry Holiday was released on December 4, 2020.

== Characters ==
=== Main ===
- Chico Bon Bon (voiced by Robbie Daymond), is a male monkey with a sweatband, a pair of sneakers, and his titular iconic tool belt. Chico is the leader of his Fix-it Force friends, and while smart, he tends to forget things and can often lose track easily. Chico uses a wide variety of tools, and has access to many kinds of parts the job may need.
- Rainbow Thunder (voiced by Dayci Brookshire), is a pink female cat with a white bodysuit. Rainbow is the Fix-it Force's main driver, often operating Tool Force 1, the Fix-it Flyer helicopter and her own Glittercycle. True to her outfit, Rainbow tends to be a bit of a daredevil, and she often performs at stadium events when not hanging with her friends. Rainbow also describes the STEM concepts in every episode.
- Clark (voiced by Anthony Tedesco), is a blue male elephant in a red tracksuit with white stripes. Clark is the gentle giant of the Fix-it Force, and because of this, his personality is noticeably a lot more timid compared to his friends. Clark is the material expert of the Fix-it Force, and he often calculates the specifications of the materials needed for the Fix-it Force's latest projects. Clark also pilots the accordingly-named Clark-copter, a spheroid helicopter stored on the roof of Tool Force 1.
- Tiny is a female purple miniature mouse who lives and works with the Fix-it Force. Tiny is noticeably much more athletic than the rest of the Fix-it Force, often using martial arts skills along with her small size to work her way out of delicate situations. Tiny is the only Fix-It Force member who doesn't wear clothing on a regular basis, and unlike the others, she has dot eyes and she doesn't speak.

=== Recurring ===
- Mrs. Coleslaw (voiced by Roberta Lemons) is a yellow elderly female skunk who is the Fix-it-Force's neighbor. She is one of the Fix-it-Force's most frequent clients.
- Mr. Buster McFluster (voiced by Cole Seaver): A white male rabbit who does multiple jobs around Blunderberg.
- Neil Ostrich (voiced by Andy Abbott) is a male ostrich who does multiple news reports around Blunderburg. In the episode Egg-mergency, it is revealed he has a wife named Nell Ostrich (voiced by Blu Bishop), and later in the episode, they had a daughter named Nina Ostrich (voiced by Emma Sloan Jacobs). Since Season 4, there has been a small running gag in that he loses his hair to the wind.
- Mr. Dunderhead (voiced by Anthony Tedesco) is male beaver who acts as a construction worker around Blunderberg and speaks in a Brooklyn accent. He is a bit clumsy in the episodes Underwear Parade (where he listens to music while Chico is asking him to give the royal undies), and Wrecking Ball Run (Where he builds a tall wall instead of a small wall as Mayor Murphy asked). He is among several identically designed characters known as the Dunderheads, appropriately named such in the fact that they always seem to cause mishaps due to misunderstandings.
- Mayor Murphy (voiced by Joanna Lewis) is a purple female poodle who is the mayor of Blunderberg. She also speaks with a British accent and has a cousin named Queen Pumpernickel (voiced by Roberta Lemons), who appeared in "Sandwich Safe".
- Elkin John (voiced by Robbie Daymond) is a blue male moose (named after the animal's Eurasian name) who is Clark's favorite singer. In the episode Chico Bon Bon and the Doggy Dilemma, it shows that he has a dog named Bernie. He is a spoof of the musician Elton John.
- Herb (voiced by Anthony Tedesco) is a male hermit crab who lives in Crabby Canyon, and displays a few Southern cowboy stereotypes. He likes to eat piping hot food, and tends to becomes crabby if he doesn't get any.
- Captain Squirrelbeard (voiced by Matthew Mercer) is a male squirrel pirate who sails in a pirate ship with a hot air balloon. Squirrelbeard is animated differently than other squirrels in the show, as he has a properly proportioned snout, he doesn't have stick-limbs, and he has eyes with pupils instead of dot eyes. Squirrelbeard is also named for his distinctive beard and the fact that his tail has a large chunk of it bitten off.
- Sprinkles (voiced by Dayci Brookshire) is a titanic pink female octopus who is Captain Squirrelbeard's friend. She likes to eat ice cream, and once rampaged through Blunderburg until she had a belly full of it.
- The Lemurettis (Betty [voiced by Blu Bishop] and Freddy [voiced by Anthony Tedesco]) are a couple of lemurs with Italian accents who run several restaurant chains in Blunderburg. Betty is yellow and has visible pink cheeks while Freddy is orange and has a mustache.
- Storm Cloud Lightning (voiced by Anthony Tedesco) is a blue male daredevil cat with a Southern accent who only appeared in "Spatula Showdown". He is a male version of Rainbow Thunder.
- Conductor Clyde (voiced by Andy Abbott), is a white male dog who is the conductor of the Choo-Choo Express, a very fast train that runs through Blunderburg.
- The Fuzzball Bunch (Ollie [voiced by Anthony Tedesco], Grind [also voiced by Matthew Mercer] and Bongo Blast [voiced by Roberta Lemons]) are a trio of skateboarding hamsters who speak with stereotypical skateboarder accents. Ollie is male and blue with yellow hair, hot pink sneakers and a hot pink helmet, Bongo Blast is female and pink with blue hair, lavender sneakers, a lavender helmet and speaks in a British tomboy accent and Grind is male and green with pink hair, purple sneakers and a purple helmet.
- Dr. Merv (voiced by Blu Bishop) is a female blue koala who is a medical doctor with a Boston accent.
- Big Phil (voiced by Anthony Tedesco) is a brown male porcupine and a neighbor of Ms. Coleslaw that appears in "Night Tear-er". He likes to go jogging when it is dark out, though he usually ends up tearing surrounding objects with his quills
- The Yum Yums (Gum Gum [voiced by Robbie Daymond] & Tum Tum [voiced by Roberta Lemons]) are a pair of green aliens from the planet Zum Zum who primarily feed on toast. Their original plan was to strip Blunderburg of all of its toast before Chico and the Fix-it Force made a toaster that worked on their planet.
- Elsa (voiced by Roberta Lemons) is a female pig who is Rainbow's cousin that appears in "Extreme Hogwash Machine" and speaks in a Southern accent. She has a toddler named Ricky Pig, who doesn't hold any interest in things that aren't races or games.
- Ricky Pig (voiced by Roberta Lemons) is a male who is Elsa's son and Rainbow's nephew that appears in "Extreme Hogwash Machine" and speaks in a Southern accent. He is a lot of fun.
- Poppy Kettlecorn (voiced by Emma Sloan Jacobs) is a blue female toddler bear who appears in "Very Berry Holiday".
- Barry the Berry Bear (voiced by Ian Nikus) is the Blunderburg equivalent of Santa Claus who only appears in "Very Berry Holiday".

== Cast ==
- Robbie Daymond as Chico Bon Bon, Elkin John and Gum Gum Yum Yum
- Dayci Brookshire as Rainbow Thunder and Sprinkles
- Anthony Tedesco as Clark, Herb, Mr Dunderhead, Freddy Lemuretti, Fuzzball Ollie, Big Phil, Stormcloud Lightning and Yuri Yikesman
- Andy Abbott as Neil Ostrich and Conductor Clyde
- Blu Bishop as Betty Lemuretti, Dr. Merv and Nell Ostrich
- Emma Sloan Jacobs as Nina Ostrich and Poppy Kettlecorn
- Roberta Lemons as Ms Coleslaw, Bernie, Fuzzball Bongo Blast, Ricky Pig, Elsa, Queen Pumpernickle and Tum Tum Yum Yum
- Joanna Lewis as Mayor Murphy
- Ian Nikus as Barry the Berry Bear
- Cole Seaver as Mr. McFluster
- Matthew Mercer as Captain Squirrelbeard and Fuzzball Grind

== Episodes ==
=== Series overview ===
| Season | Episodes | Originally released |
|---|---|---|
| 1 | 10 | May 8, 2020 |
| 2 | 10 | July 1, 2020 |
| 3 | 10 | September 22, 2020 |
| 4 | 8 | October 27, 2020 |
| Christmas special | | December 4, 2020 |

=== Season 1 (2020) ===
| No. overall | No. in season | Title | Written by | Storyboarded by | Original release date |
|---|---|---|---|---|---|
| 1 | 1 | "Underwear Parade" | Michael Goldberg and Gabe Pulliam | Céilí Braidwood | May 8, 2020 |
Blunderburg's annual Underwear Parade is about to begin. The mayor's royal undies keep falling down. The Fix-It Force work hard to help them stay put. STEM topic: Elasticity
| 2 | 2 | "Musical Meltdown" | Michael Goldberg | Jason Bryant Parker | May 8, 2020 |
Famous pianist Elkin John is about to perform on the top of Blunderburg Tower. However, his piano won't fit inside the elevator. STEM topic: Pulleys
| 3 | 3 | "Piping Hot Pizza Problem" | Michael Goldberg | Boyet Gopez | May 8, 2020 |
Bridge-eating beetles prevent Mr. McFluster from delivering a pie across the canyon. The team explore options, including the use of air pressure. STEM topic: Air Pressure
| 4 | 4 | "Runaway Robot" | Bob Boyle | Davide Veca | May 8, 2020 |
The Fix-It Force is surprised to hear a high-tech refrigerator they built has come alive. They go on a hunt to catch the missing robot. STEM topic: Magnets
| 5 | 5 | "Piratey Predicament" | Sarah Mullervy | Davide Veca | May 8, 2020 |
Captain Squirrelbeard takes a cupcake to a sea monster pal. His boat gets stuck, so Chico's crew sets out to help get him back out to sea. STEM topic: Hot air rises
| 6 | 6 | "Doggy Dilemma" | Sarah Mullervy | Tim Spillane | May 8, 2020 |
The Fix-It Force takes care of Bernie the dog. The sneaky puppy manages to escape, so the friends head out to find him. STEM topic: Multifuctional objects
| 7 | 7 | "Fast Food Fiasco" | Laura Sreenby | Jason Bryant Parker | May 8, 2020 |
The Lemurettis can't cope with demand after their Pizzarito becomes a popular snack. The Fix-It Force try to come up with a solution, involving automation. STEM topic: Automation
| 8 | 8 | "Egg-mergency" | Halcyon Person | Céilí Braidwood | May 8, 2020 |
Neil and Nell Ostrich announce that they are having a baby. The Fix-It force think of ways to get their egg to the hospital before the baby arrives. STEM topic: Shock absorption
| 9 | 9 | "Spatula Showdown" | Halcyon Person | Micha Cohen | May 8, 2020 |
Rainbow Thunder and Stormcloud Lightning have a pancake-flipping contest. She needs the best spatula in the business in order to be crowned the best. STEM topic: Flexible plastic
| 10 | 10 | "Ah-Choo Express" | Morgan Von Ancken | Micha Cohen | May 8, 2020 |
Clark isn't allowed to go to Blunderburg Station because he has a cold. His friends come up with a way to bring the train to him, instead! STEM topic: Propulsion

=== Season 2 (2020) ===
| No. overall | No. in season | Title | Written by | Storyboarded by | Original release date |
|---|---|---|---|---|---|
| 11 | 1 | "Gigantic Glue Ball" | Bryan Korn & Gabe Pulliam | Davide Veca | July 1, 2020 |
The gang relies on some super glue to fix up the town following a large burp-quake. However, the glue works better than any of them could have hoped. STEM topic: Adhesion
| 12 | 2 | "Sandwich Safe" | Kevin Burke & Chris "Doc" Wyatt | Mireia Serra | July 1, 2020 |
Mayor Murphy's new sandwich concoction proves so irresistible that she hides it from the town. However, when she loses her key to the safe she put the sandwich in, trouble unfolds. STEM topic: Patterns
| 13 | 3 | "Great Pinball Escape" | Morgan Von Ancken | Benjamin Sanders | July 1, 2020 |
The friends team up to help free Mrs. Coleslaw's toaster from a big hole. STEM topic: Springs
| 14 | 4 | "Hot Cocoa Crisis" | Bryan Korn | Davide Veca | July 1, 2020 |
When his morning cocoa is too cold, Herb the Hermit Crab throws a temper tantrum. The gang puts their heads together to figure out how to heat it back up. STEM topic: Magnification
| 15 | 5 | "Garden Gobblers" | Sarah Mullervy | Jason Bryant Parker | July 1, 2020 |
The mayor's carrots are devoured by the Garden Gobblers so it is up to the gang to devise a plan to put a stop to their greed. STEM topic: Suction
| 16 | 6 | "Magnificent Mumble Mystery" | Adam Felber | Robin French | July 1, 2020 |
Mrs. Coleslaw enlists Chico and his friends to solve a mystery. STEM topic: Lubricants
| 17 | 7 | "Mountain of Lost Socks" | Bob Boyle & Frank Rocco | Benjamin Sanders | July 1, 2020 |
Chico and his pals develop a machine capable of sorting a giant pile of mismatched socks. The friends then resolve to return missing socks to their owners. STEM topic: Sorting
| 18 | 8 | "Danger Gnomes" | Chris Monroe | Jason Bryant Parker | July 1, 2020 |
The mayor's mechanical garden gnomes get out of control and end up polluting the town air. The friends then gather to find a cleaner solution. STEM topic: Solar energy
| 19 | 9 | "Night Tear-er" | Halcyon Person | Leigh Fieldhouse | July 1, 2020 |
Mrs. Coleslaw helps Chico and his friends find out who is behind the "Night Tear-er" pranks. STEM topic: Puncture resistance
| 20 | 10 | "Spaghetti Situation" | Laura Sreebny | Val Anthony Ramirez | July 1, 2020 |
The gang comes together to help the Lemurettis attract customers to their new restaurant perched atop Mount Parmesan. STEM topic: Counterweights

=== Season 3 (2020) ===
| No. overall | No. in season | Title | Written by | Storyboarded by | Original release date |
|---|---|---|---|---|---|
| 21 | 1 | "Tower of Goo" | Morgan Von Ancken | Leigh Fieldhouse | September 22, 2020 |
Mrs. Coleslaw and the Blunderfolk meet a huge sticky goo monster. Chico uses his spray to fight through the goo to rescue his friends. STEM topic: Silicone
| 22 | 2 | "Slippy Grippy Shuffle" | Gabe Pulliam | Robin French | September 22, 2020 |
"Dancing with the Seals" is on in town and Mrs. Coleslaw needs help. She asks the Fix-It Force to make grippy shoes that can help her keep time with the slippery sea animals. STEM topic: Friction
| 23 | 3 | "Unbreakable Piñata" | Gabe Pulliam | Benjamin Sanders | September 22, 2020 |
When she's piñata wrestling, Tiny becomes the invincible Macho Mouse! But can the Fix-It Force help her in a match against the durable Piñata of Doom? STEM topic: Material properties and rubber
| 24 | 4 | "Gong Gone Wrong" | Morgan Von Ancken | Céilí Braidwood | September 22, 2020 |
Captain Squirrelbeard's loud treasure gong is keeping everyone awake, sending the Fix-It Force on a search for ways to soundproof the town. STEM topic: Sound vibrations
| 25 | 5 | "Wrecking Ball Run" | Haley Mancini | Boyet Gopez | September 22, 2020 |
Clark is eager to win the Elephant Ninja Warrior Race. The Fix-It Force engineer a pendulum to help him get through a difficult obstacle at the end of the challenge. STEM topic: Pendulums
| 26 | 6 | "Desert Disaster" | Gabe Pulliam | Jason Bryant Parker | September 22, 2020 |
The Fix-It Force find themselves stuck in the middle of a desert. They have no food or water. They decide to build a glider to fly back to Blunderberg. STEM topic: Gliding
| 27 | 7 | "Extreme Hogwash Machine" | Bryan Korn | Lincoln Adams | September 22, 2020 |
Rainbow's nephew Ricky Pig is pretty stinky since he refuses to take baths, so Chico's crew designs the ultimate stunt course to finally get him clean. STEM topic: Systems
| 28 | 8 | "Chico Bot Bot" | Allan Neuwirth | Davide Veca | September 22, 2020 |
Blunderburg's new fix-it robot is causing problems instead of solving them! Can Chico's team step in to stop the bot from making more of a mess in town? STEM topic: Clients and efficiency
| 29 | 9 | "Pudding Volcano" | Kristofer Wellman | Val Anthony Ramirez | September 22, 2020 |
Mount Fudgey is threatening to erupt chocolate pudding all over the town. The Fix-It Force engineer a pipe network to channel the pudding away. STEM topic: Systems and funnels
| 30 | 10 | "Space Toaster" | Michael Goldberg | Val Anthony Ramirez | September 22, 2020 |
The Yum Yums from Planet Zum Zum love toast, so Chico and friends teach these aliens how to make it before they blast off with the town's total supply. STEM topic: Voice activation

=== Season 4 (2020) ===
| No. overall | No. in season | Title | Written by | Storyboarded by | Original release date |
|---|---|---|---|---|---|
| 31 | 1 | "Ice Cream Monster" | Halcyon Person | Robin French | October 27, 2020 |
The Fix-It Force must locate a huge serving of ice cream. A giant monster is on the loose trying to eat all the ice cream she can get. STEM topic: Thermal insulation
| 32 | 2 | "Tremendous Tree Trouble" | Adam Felber | Boyet Gopez | October 27, 2020 |
Blunderburg's trees are at risk because of tree-gobbling insects. Chico and pals remember that Sprinkle Ball might just come in handy. STEM topic: Agricultural engineering
| 33 | 3 | "Tool Belt Test" | Michael Goldberg | Robin French | October 27, 2020 |
Chico is always the best at the tool belt test. However, accidents around him put his winning streak at risk. STEM topic: Chain reactions
| 34 | 4 | "Skate of Emergency" | Bob Boyle & Frank Rocco | Robin French | October 27, 2020 |
Skateboarders will make a mess of City Hall before Mr. McFluster's once-a-year inspection — unless Chico's crew can build a park with a radical ramp. STEM topic: Acceleration
| 35 | 5 | "Very Broken Brakes" | Kevin Burke & Chris "Doc" Wyatt | Micha Cohen | October 27, 2020 |
No street cart is safe when Mrs. Coleslaw blindly slips into the driver's seat of Tool Force One. Only Chico's makeshift parachute can slow her down! STEM topic: Parachutes and Drag
| 36 | 6 | "Missing Book Mystery" | Haley Mancini | Boyet Gopez | October 27, 2020 |
Book adoring thieves are stealing anything they can read. The Fix-It Force create a device to help locate them and collect the books. STEM topic: Tracking device
| 37 | 7 | "Blunderburg Blackout" | Adam Felber | Val Anthony Ramirez | October 27, 2020 |
They've lost all power in Blunderburg Tower! Without a battery with a big-enough charge, Chico and Co. need to find a new way to generate electricity. STEM topic: Wind power
| 38 | 8 | "Sticky Situation" | Allan Neuwirth | Boyet Gopez | October 27, 2020 |
Popsicles are the ideal way to manage the heat. But thrown away sticks are causing problems all over the town. Chico comes up with a way to repurpose them into new objects. STEM topic: Repurposing

=== Christmas special (2020) ===
| No. overall | No. in season | Title | Written by | Storyboarded by | Original release date |
|---|---|---|---|---|---|
| 39 | 1 | "Very Berry Holiday" | Gabe Pulliam & Kristofer Wellman | Céilí Braidwood | December 4, 2020 |
The Fix-It Force makes a plan to hit every home as fast as they can, delivering Blunderberry Cakes before the town awakes to avoid a holiday disaster. STEM topic: Route optimization

== Release ==
Chico Bon Bon: Monkey with a Tool Belt was released on May 8, 2020 on Netflix.
