= Buddi =

- Genre: Comedy Adventure Fantasy
- Created by: Jason Jameson
- Based on: Buddi Kotti World by Jason Jameson
- Written by: Barbara Slade; Jason Jameson; Robert Milne; Karen Ullmann; Paul Laikin; Naima Vogt
- Directed by: Robert Milne; Karen Ullmann
- Voices of: Greta Jameson; Ralf Jameson; Clementine Laikin; Felix Laikin
- Composer: Jon Griffin
- Countries of origin: United Kingdom; China
- Original language: English
- No. of seasons: 2
- No. of episodes: 16

Production
- Executive producers: Graham Appleby; Keith Chapman; Erica Darby; Morgan Francis; Mara Leighton; Alan Ross; Adam Stanhope
- Producers: Tony Hal; Paul Laikin; Guo Xiang
- Running time: 12 min (S1) 13 min (S2)
- Production companies: Frog Land Productions; GCI Film; Shanghai Motion Magic; Spider Eye Inc.; Unanico

Original release
- Network: Netflix
- Release: 20 March – 11 September 2020

Buddi is a children's animated television series created by Jason Jameson for Netflix that won an Annie Award nomination in 2021 (Best TV/Media—Preschool). It is also shown on Australian TV network ABC. The plot revolves around the Buddis consisting of Cini, Vihi, Iso, Kelta and Puna. The names are derived from Finnish; Cini (sini) meaning blue, Vihi meaning green, Iso translates as Big, Kelta meaning Yellow and Puna meaning Red. The series premiered on March 20, 2020 while the second season was released on September 11, 2020.

Buddi website

== Characters ==
- Cini is a happy dumpling shaped Buddi and is the cheerful, enthusiastic leader of the group. Like Iso’s horn or Vihi’s light, Cini also has a special skill. He is able make his thought images appear out of the top of his head via a Thought Bubble. This allows Cini to generate a lot of the primary ideas for the group during their adventures.
- Vihi is the youngest, most sensitive, emotional and compassionate Buddi. Vihi moves around on six dainty legs, making them a highly creative dancer and an excellent swimmer. From the top of their head, Vihi shines a bright light that not only amplifies their emotions but can also be used as a handy torch. Vihi can be shy and timid, and sometimes a little fearful.
- Puna is the most protective, responsible and cautious Buddi. Being the tallest, Puna can often spot problems ahead from their bird’s eye view. Nothing makes Puna happier than being close to Kelta, who rides on top of their shoulders, and together this endearing sibling duo often find solutions to the challenges that face the Buddis.
- Kelta rides high on his big sibling Puna’s shoulders and is a curious young Buddi with a hand that’s always reaching out for a new adventure. Kelta often tests his independence but, after a while, truly misses his big sibling, and will throw his arm around loyal Puna when they are re-united.
- Iso is the oldest, largest and speediest Buddi, as she moves around on 4 small wheels. Iso has a tendency to act cheeky and show off. Iso’s emotional reactions and ability to communicate are often expressed through the horn that stands proudly on her side.

== Setting ==
The Buddis live on a fictional planet known as Buddi Kotti.

== Episodes ==
=== Series overview ===
Season	Episodes	Originally released
1	8	March 20, 2020
2	8	September 11, 2020

=== Season 1 (2020) ===
No. overall	No. in season	Title	Original release date
1	1	"Seed / Hole"	March 20, 2020
2	2	"Lost Marble / Mirror"	March 20, 2020
3	3	"Leaf / Nest"	March 20, 2020
4	4	"Puzzle / Maze"	March 20, 2020
5	5	"Gooey Ball / Rocks"	March 20, 2020
6	6	"Pool / Fruit"	March 20, 2020
7	7	"Whistle / Bubble"	March 20, 2020
8	8	"Little Bug / Paint"	March 20, 2020

=== Season 2 (2020) ===
No. overall	No. in season	Title	Original release date
9	1	"See-Saw / Glowpods"	September 11, 2020
10	2	"Hollow Log / Birthday"	September 11, 2020
11	3	"Sandcastle / Shadow"	September 11, 2020
12	4	"Tickle / Sneeze"	September 11, 2020
13	5	"Stream / Rainbow"	September 11, 2020
14	6	"Star / Mudcake"	September 11, 2020
15	7	"Sound Nut / Engine"	September 11, 2020
16	8	"Snow (Double Length Episode)"	September 11, 2020

== Release ==
Buddi was released on March 20, 2020 on Netflix.
