= Sergio Matteucci =

Italian actor (1931–2020)

Sergio Matteucci (31 August 1931 - 4 November 2020) was an Italian voice actor and radio presenter.

== Biography ==
As a voice actor, he was known for lending his voice to the commentator of the animated series Captain Tsubasa. He also lent his voice in Fisherman Sanpei , Urusei Yatsura, The Monster Kid, Dastardly and Muttley in Their Flying Machines, Lady Oscar and in the movies Rocky II and Rocky IV. He was also the radio commentator of Tutto il calcio minuto per minuto in the 1982-1983 season, and the voiceover of the match reports at the Olympic stadium in Rome during Domenica Sprint. He died in Rome on November 4, 2020.
