= Juan Padrón =

Cuban animation director and comics artist (1947–2020)

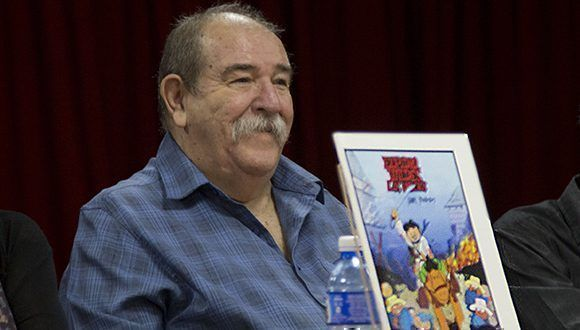
Juan Padrón

Juan Manuel Padrón Blanco (January 29, 1947 – March 24, 2020) was a Cuban animation director and comics artist, best known as the creator of the comic strip Elpidio Valdés.

He was born in Matanzas. From 1963 he published sketches and cartoons for Cuban magazines and newspapers. He was the creator, in 1970, of Elpidio Valdés, a cartoon character (and series) with more than twenty shorts and three feature-length movies. Padrón received international attention for Vampires in Havana, an adult-oriented comedy feature that gathered a cult following abroad.

Padrón directed six animated feature films in total, along with many shorts, especially those with Elpidio Valdés as the main character; and the one-minute comedy sketches for adults "Filminutos".

In 2008, Padrón was selected as the recipient of Cuba's National Film Award.

https://www.youtube.com/watch?v=BUSp-_Te9Oc

Juan Padrón made Erotips, a series of 150 humorous adult-themed animated short films.

== Death ==
On 24 March 2020, Juan Padrón died in Havana, Cuba after having been in the hospital in intensive care for several days due to a lung disease.
