= List of The Owl House characters =

The main and most of the recurring characters from The Owl House, as shown in the series finale, "Watching and Dreaming", waving goodbye to the audience.

This is a list of characters featured in the Disney Channel animated series The Owl House, created by Dana Terrace.

== Overview ==
Actor	Character	Seasons		
Actor	Character	1	2	3
Main cast
Sarah-Nicole Robles	Luz Noceda	Main	Main	Main
Wendie Malick (Note: Natalie Palamides voices a younger Eda.)	Eda Clawthorne	Main	Main	Main
Alex Hirsch (Note: Dana Terrace voices a younger King.)	King Clawthorne	Main	Main	Main
Alex Hirsch	Hooty	Main	Main	Starring
Tati Gabrielle	Willow Park	Starring	Starring	Main
Issac Ryan Brown (Note: Carter Jones voices a younger Gus.)	Gus Porter	Starring	Starring	Main
Mae Whitman	Amity Blight	Starring	Starring	Main
Cissy Jones (Note: Abigail Zoe Lewis voices a younger Lilith.)	Lilith Clawthorne	Recurring	Starring	Starring
Matthew Rhys (Note: Alex Lawther voices a younger Philip.)	Emperor Belos / Philip Wittebane	Recurring	Starring	Main
Zeno Robinson	Hunter / the Golden Guard	Silent	Starring	Main
Avi Roque (Note: Blu del Barrio voices a younger Raine.)	Raine Whispers		Starring (Note: Introduced as a recurring character, they were promoted to Starring in season 2, episode 15: "Them's the Breaks, Kid".)	Starring
Elizabeth Grullon	Camila Noceda	Guest	Recurring	Main
Fryda Wolff	The Collector		Recurring	Main
Michaela Dietz	Vee / Number 5		Recurring	Starring

== Main ==
=== Luz Noceda ===
Luz Noceda (voiced by Sarah-Nicole Robles) is a 14-year-old Afro-Dominican-American girl from Gravesfield, Connecticut who ends up on the Boiling Isles and becomes Eda's apprentice and a new exchange student at Hexside Academy. Luz loves all things fantasy and magical, wanting to become a witch even before receiving training. She often feels as though she does not fit in, which results in poor self-worth when she messes up and a desire to be seen as special and valued, and it is implied her low self-esteem has caused her to have a guilt and martyr complex. She learns she can use magic by drawing glyphs that she sees in the environment and through spell circles witches cast to do magic. After becoming an official student of Hexside, she is disappointed upon learning students are not allowed to study more than one type of magic. Later, however, with help from the detention track students, Luz saves the school from a magic-eating Greater Basilisk who disguised herself as the Emperor's Coven inspector. As a result, Principal Bump is convinced mixing magic is not bad and lets the other trouble-making students study more than one track, with Luz becoming the first student officially allowed to learn magic from all tracks. At the end of season one, Luz is forced to destroy the portal, her only way home, to prevent Emperor Belos from invading it.

In season two, Luz begins teaching Eda and Lilith to use glyph magic as she searches for a way home. Unbeknownst to her, there is a doppelgänger posing as her while living with Camila. She also begins to realize that Amity Blight has a crush on her, with the two of them becoming a couple in "Knock, Knock, Knockin' on Hooty's Door". Luz eventually uses a portal to see her mother, and discovers an opportunistic yet kind young basilisk named Vee was posing as her. After convincing her mother to look after her, Luz accidentally gives the impression that she wanted to get away from her, and as she is forced back to the Boiling Isles, she promises her she will come back and stay in the Human Realm. Luz eventually tells Eda and King, but neglects to bring this up to others until Amity finds her cell phone and asks what is happening with her. In "Reaching Out", it is revealed her father died when she was young, and she annually collects flowers to remember him. Luz later enacts a plan to help disrupt the Day of Unity by allowing herself to be captured by Kikimora while disguised as Hunter using Gus's illusions. Luz manages to stop the Day of Unity, but is forced to leave King and Eda behind in the Demon Realm and returns to the Human Realm with Amity, Gus, Willow, and Hunter, where she reunites with her mother.

In season three, Luz eventually returns to the Boiling Isles alongside her friends and mother. She finally gains a palisman in the form of a "snake shifter" which she names Stringbean. After reuniting with Eda and King, she also shows compassion towards the Collector, befriending him and learning King's parent, the Titan, has been aiding her through her glyph magic. When Belos possesses the Titan's heart and attempts to kill everyone on the Isles, Luz sacrifices herself to save the Collector's life. After meeting the Titan's spirit in the In-Between Realm, Luz is temporarily given the last of his power, which revives her and allows her to defeat and destroy Belos with help from Eda, King, and Raine Whispers. Afterwards, Luz is able to live with her friends and family in both the Human and Demon Realms, after the Collector creates a new, permanent portal door for her. In the series' final scene, when Luz turns 18, everybody throws a "King-ceañera" party for her, to make up for her using her previous three birthdays to help rebuild the Boiling Isles. She also learns that, while her original glyph magic died with the Titan, the growing King has developed new glyphs for her to learn.

According to Dana Terrace, Luz is named after her Dominican-American roommate, Luz Batista, a story consultant for the show, and is Disney's first confirmed bisexual lead character, a trait that she had to fight for.

=== Eda Clawthorne ===
Edalyn "Eda" Clawthorne (voiced by Wendie Malick as an adult, Dee Bradley Baker in owl beast form, Natalie Palamides as a young girl), also known as "The Owl Lady", is the self-proclaimed most powerful witch on the Boiling Isles, and Luz's mentor. A reward has been offered for her capture due to her criminal record, which includes offenses such as selling human items, not joining a coven, and theft. Whilst Eda's approach to teaching is often chaotic and uncoordinated, she has a deeper understanding of magic than she lets on, is able to effectively perform powerful spells, and her approach is ultimately instrumental in Luz discovering her own magic. Eda attended Hexside School of Magic and Demonics when she was younger, but now despises it. While she is pleased to see Luz banned from campus following an incident, she relents upon realizing Luz wants more knowledge, and makes a deal with Principal Bump to allow Luz to attend classes, admitting that she cares about Luz and her happiness. Eda initially claims she was called The Owl Lady because of her home and possessing traits similar to owls, but it is later revealed to be due to a curse that causes her to turn into an owl beast and which she must drink an elixir daily to suppress. Over the course of season one, the elixir begins to lose its potency on her, and it becomes harder for her to keep the transformation at bay. Eda's relationship with her sister Lilith is complicated, and while they clearly care about one another, Eda is resistant to working with her under the Emperor's Coven and openly fights with Lilith to retain her freedom. It is later revealed that Eda wanted to join the coven, but was willing to give up her position since Lilith wanted it. Eda was cursed by Lilith when they fought for the position, and she had been working to try and break the curse. They make up as Eda's condition worsens, and Lilith decides to share the burden of Eda's curse, lessening its effects but greatly weakening their magic and giving them two different colored eyes.

In season two, Eda begins to deal with the fact that she is no longer all-powerful and initially struggles to earn money for the Owl House. With Luz's help, they manage to secure Selkigris and are fiscally secure. In "Echoes of the Past", it is revealed Eda found and took King in when he was a baby, and, while raising him, unintentionally convinced him he was the King of Demons. In "Keeping up A-fear-ances", she reunites with her mother Gwendolyn and makes amends after making her realize that she has been using holistic medicine to hide the shame of her curse. She is also reunited with fellow witch and head of the Bard Coven Raine Whispers, her ex-partner who she is implied to still have feelings for. In "Knock, Knock, Knockin' on Hooty's Door", Eda realizes her fear of her curse has caused her to push those close to her away. After confronting her owl-beast side in her dreams, she makes a truce with it and gains the ability to transform into a harpy-like owl-creature. During the Day of Unity, Eda allows herself to be branded with a Bard sigil by the rebel group Covens Against the Throne so she can sneak in and disrupt the ceremony. When the plan fails, Raine pulls off Eda's sigil-branded arm so that she would not be subjected to the spell.

In season three, Eda and King reunite with Luz upon her return, and they work together to befriend the Collector and, with Raine's help, destroy Belos for good. In the epilogue of the series, Eda becomes a teacher at a school for wild magic and gains a hook hand.

Malick compared the character to previous roles in her career, "When I saw Eda I immediately went 'oh, that's my girl'... she even dresses a little bit like Nina Van Horn from Just Shoot Me!... I love her dress, I love her tooth... I just fell in love with her the second I saw her".

=== King ===
King Clawthorne (voiced by Alex Hirsch in the present, Dana Terrace as a baby and toddler forms, and "squeak of rage" effects) is a small young titan with a skull-like head, and Eda's roommate who is the self-proclaimed "King of Demons". While it is not known if he truly is the King of Demons, he does have a confident and domineering attitude, which implies that he once held some greatness. He was initially frightened of Luz when he first met her, but warmed up to her when she helped him. King wants to be seen as "cool" and claims to have vast knowledge of all monsters and demons, though some of it might be based on his own false presumptions. Regardless, he is willing to acknowledge it if it was incorrect. While he is quick to poke fun at Eda, he cares about her and wants to help repress her curse. King is shown to be bossy and manipulative, but ultimately shows his heroic and caring side whenever he and his friends are in danger. His ultimate goal is to obtain followers and have absolute power, which results in him finding himself in ludicrous situations such as bringing dolls to life to do his bidding, becoming a teacher at Hexside, and using Eda in her monster form to rule a playground. All efforts usually result in him losing this "power" and things going back to normal. Despite his rambunctious nature, he cares for Luz and misses her whenever she goes out to Hexside or hangs out with others.

In season two, King's origins begin to be revealed. In the episode "Echoes of the Past", King is revealed to not be the king of demons. Eda found him as a toddler on an island, being watched over by a strange amorphous creature that she managed to evade. While raising him, she unintentionally convinced him he was the King of Demons. He discovered that he had just hatched from his egg and, believing that his father was someone important, has Luz reattach his horn so he can retain some memories to look for his father. In "Eda's Requiem", he legally gets adopted by Eda and changes his name to King Clawthorne. In "Knock, Knock, Knockin' on Hooty's Door", King discovers that he can produce an echoing blast after admitting that he is upset about his father leaving him. In "Edge of the World", it is revealed that King is a Titan. This news affects him emotionally and he begins to question his goals; it is only through a meeting with former Coven Guard Steve that he begins to accept himself. King ends up stopping the Day of Unity by releasing the Collector, who his father had sealed away in the past. King then sends Luz and her friends away to the Human Realm to protect them from the Collector's games.

In Season Three, As King spends time with the Collector as his chosen playmate, he comes to understand that he is misguided rather than malicious and discourages Eda and Lilith from attempting to reimprison him. Upon Luz's return, King and Eda reunite with her and aid her in befriending the Collector and, with Raine Whispers' help, destroy Belos once and for all. In the epilogue, King's developing Titan powers allow him to create a new glyph system, which he begins to teach Luz.

=== Hooty ===
Hooty (voiced by Hirsch) is the house demon (as he is classified by Patch in "Hooty's Moving Hassle" and by Lilith in "Agony of a Witch") of the Owl House. He resembles a barn owl, with giant legs that he can walk around with when given the power to, à la Baba Yaga's hut, and uses the owl-headed doorknocker to interact with the world around him by stretching his neck. Often, his odd behavior happens when no one is in the house. Despite this, he is capable of taking care of himself and attacking with his neck. Hooty has a habit of wanting to be seen as enigmatic or mysterious, which he does by posing riddles to people, but this usually results in him getting injured. Apparently, he feels everything affecting the house itself and at one point, his door is ripped off, causing him to become unconscious. However, by the end of the episode, he recovers.

In season two, Hooty begins to warm up to Lilith and aims to become her friend, and manages to earn her respect when he helps her secure fire bee honey. In "Echoes of the Past", Hooty is revealed to have the ability to remove himself from the door and reinsert himself into other objects. The process of him physically doing this is not shown, but it is enough to disgust Luz, Lilith, and King. Hooty later becomes distraught when Lilith decides to leave the Owl House. However, he becomes a more supportive figure in his friends' lives as he manages to help King, Eda, and Luz embrace their fears and move forward. During his time with King, Hooty stated that he is under the Bug Demon classification. In "Follies at the Coven Day Parade", it is revealed that he is capable of removing his skin to reveal his skeleton.

After the Collector stopped the Draining Spell, Hooty is turned into a puppet resembling a jack-in-the-box, and was placed in the Archives along with the other puppets of the people that Luz knew. When he is brought to Lilith, Hooty still regains consciousness in his puppet form. When Belos is defeated, Hooty is returned to normal by the Collector, happily reuniting with Lilith.

== Supporting ==
=== Willow Park ===
Willow Park (voiced by Tati Gabrielle) is a student at Hexside and Luz, Amity, Gus and Hunter's friend. She is skilled with plant magic, but was originally placed in the Abomination Track due to her parents' wishes. She struggled with this track, which caused her classmates to bully her, calling her "Half-a-Witch Willow". Upon meeting Luz, the two attempt to improve her image. Eventually, Willow is forced to use her plant magic to save Luz, which Principal Bump sees and allows her to transfer to the Plant Track. Since then, Willow has overcome her shyness and insecurities and become confident and level-headed, acting as the voice of reason to Luz's eccentricity and Gus' over-confidence. It is later revealed she and Amity were childhood friends, but the latter's parents blackmailed her into ditching Willow due to not wanting to associate with her because of her lack of magic. Willow eventually learns this in "Understanding Willow" and forgives Amity; the same episode shows that Willow has two fathers named Gilbert and Harvey Park. In "Wing It Like Witches", Willow's newfound confidence earns her some respect at Hexside since she and Amity rekindled their friendship, though some students like Boscha still pick on her. She shows considerable restraint, as while she wants to use the Green Thumb Gauntlet to expand her plant abilities, she immediately returns it, though she uses it to help Luz.

In season two, Willow is nearly expelled, an event that shocks her fathers. While Harvey is shown to be very protective and studious, Gilbert secretly allows her to escape to help her friends. In "Hunting Palismen", Willow gets her own staff and palisman in the form of a bee named Clover. In "Any Sport in a Storm", she starts a Flying Derby team with Gus, Skara, Viney, and an incognito Hunter. Despite the latter's betrayal, he reforms and rescues his friends, causing Willow to become more appreciative of him. At the end of "King's Tide", Willow flees to the human realm with Luz, Amity, Gus and Hunter. She eventually returns to the Boiling Isles, where she finally faces Boscha and overcomes her self-doubt with help from Hunter, whom she is implied to have a crush on. In the epilogue, Willow continues to play flying derby, and is now in a relationship with Hunter.

She is confirmed to be pansexual.

=== Gus Porter ===
Augustus "Gus" Porter (voiced by Issac Ryan Brown) is a student at Hexside and Luz, Amity, Willow and Hunter's friend. He is skilled in illusion magic and is part of the Illusion Track. He is obsessed with human culture and is amazed when he first meets Luz. However, he is oblivious to common human norms, such as high fiving and nicknames, and quickly takes to being called Gus after Luz tells him she knew someone with a similar name. Since then, Gus has been a prominent friend to Luz. He is well-gifted in illusion casting, as he can freely move about campus while his illusion clone attends classes. He was moved up a couple of grades, explaining why he is noticeably younger than Luz and Willow despite being in their grade. He was the president of the Human Appreciation Society (H.A.S.), but in a misled effort to retain his title, he lies to Luz about having lifted her ban from the school, which gets them in more trouble. He ultimately comes clean, but loses his place as president of H.A.S. Gus is self-assertive, but also seeks others' approval. Nevertheless, he is confident and seemingly not afraid to speak his mind. When using the oracle sphere to show his "best self", his illusion clone informs him that he is "always [his] best self", news that moves him to tears. His father Perry is a news reporter for BBN-HXN.

In season two, Gus is shown to have slightly aged, which according to him is "witch puberty". He also begins to hone his illusion abilities when he aids an illusion master known as the Keeper of the Looking Glass Ruins. In "Hunting Palismen", Gus gets his own staff and palisman in the form of a blue chameleon named Emmiline Bailey Marcostimo. Gus joins Willow's Flying Derby team and befriends Hunter, despite his attempt to betray them. In "Labyrinth Runners", Gus is shown to have had trouble making friends, as everyone takes advantage of his intellect. Willow became his first genuine friend and taught him a breathing technique, which Gus later shares with Hunter. His illusionary abilities are also revealed to be rather powerful, but can become untamed if he is stressed or upset. He befriends Hunter, who becomes another genuine friend. At the end of "King's Tide", Gus flees to the human realm with Luz, Amity, Willow and Hunter. He eventually returns along with Luz, Camila, and the rest of the gang to help defeat the Collector, and eventually, Belos. In the epilogue, Gus becomes a teacher in the wild magic university.

=== Amity Blight ===
Amity Blight (voiced by Mae Whitman) is a student at Hexside; she is an abomination expert and works part-time at the Bonesborough Library. She is Luz's girlfriend and Willow and Gus' friend. Initially, she appears to be an petty and cold-hearted top student, who bullies those she feels are inferior to her. When Luz arrives, she unintentionally causes her to lose her cool in front of her teacher and Principal Bump; she also loses her top student title when she nearly gets Luz killed. In her next appearance, she begins to hold severe disdain towards Luz, blaming her for getting her in trouble and mocking her dream of becoming a witch. This leads Luz to challenge her to a witches' duel, which will determine whether Luz will continue witch training. However, when Amity is exposed of cheating on Lilith's part, she runs off and lashes out at Luz, accusing her for humiliating her in front of the Emperor's Coven and embarrassing her at school, while lamenting how much pressure she puts on herself to be the best. However, she is surprised when Luz shows kindness while trying to comfort her and allows her to continue magic training. Despite still acting hostile towards Luz, Amity slowly begins to show a sentimental side and claims she is trying to understand Luz. Eventually, she starts to become fascinated with her desire to be genuine friends, and after a night of peril with her at the library, they make up and bond over their shared love of The Good Witch Azura. This leads Amity to realize that Luz never meant any harm and that she never took the time to get to know her. She also decides to reflect on her earlier antagonistic behavior after realizing her own attitude was not helping. From that point on, Amity's personality changes from open hatred to genuine friendliness, though displaying nervousness around Luz. "Understanding Willow" reveals that Amity has been putting on an act under the controlling influence of her parents, namely her emotionally abusive mother, Odalia, who blackmailed her into ditching Willow. While she was seemingly excited to join the Emperor's Coven, Odalia had groomed her to join. Thanks to Luz's emotional support, she makes amends with Willow and restores their friendship, and also ends her forced association with Boscha. She is later revealed to have a crush on Luz, to the point that she gets nervous when around her. Amity has since become her own person, welcomed by her genuine friends Luz, Willow, and Gus, and appears to be more in control of her emotions while around her.

In season two, Amity is put upon by Odalia and Alador when they expel her friends from Hexside for being a "bad influence" on her. But when they endanger Luz when she tries to get her and her friends back into school, she stands up to Odalia and gets them back into Hexside. She acknowledges that Luz's arrival changed her for the better, and redyes her hair lilac because Odalia forced her to have her hair dyed green to match with her siblings. She also confirms her feelings for Luz by kissing her on the cheek, though she is later embarrassed by this. In "Knock, Knock, Knockin' on Hooty's Door", she and Luz officially become a couple. In "Eclipse Lake", Amity gains her own staff and palisman in the form of a cat named Ghost. In "Reaching Out", Amity finally tells Alador that joining the Emperor's Coven was Odalia's dream and was never what she wanted, as she does not want to join a coven, and reveals that she is dating Luz. In "Clouds on the Horizon", Amity disowns her mother after learning she is working with Belos in his plans for the Day of Unity. At the end of "King's Tide", Amity flees to the human realm with Luz, Willow, Gus and Hunter. She eventually returns and discovers that Boscha misses her, but cuts her out of her life. In the epilogue, Amity becomes an abomination engineer.

Amity is the first major animated Disney character to be a confirmed lesbian.

=== Hunter ===
Hunter (voiced by Zeno Robinson) is a teen who was the current Golden Guard, taken in by the manipulative and abusive Belos as his nephew and enforcer. He is the latest in a series of grimwalkers—clones that Belos created in the image of his brother, Caleb, whom he killed after he fell in love with a witch named Evelyn. While easygoing and practical despite being imposing and mischievous, Hunter is a prodigy in magic who became head of the Emperor's Coven after Lilith defected. Hunter later visits Blight Industries to purchase Abomatons for Belos's army, as he states that Belos dislikes anyone establishing an unauthorized private army. In "Hunting Palismen", Hunter develops an interest in wild magic and thinks it could cure Belos, despite Belos's insistence that wild magic caused their family's downfall. He ends up working with Luz after Kikimora tries to kill him when he is sent to gather palismen. While desperate to seek Belos's approval, he is ultimately won over by Luz into doing the right thing and lets Luz leave with the palismen. Afterwards, Hunter gets his own staff and palisman in the form of a cardinal called Flapjack. While still devoted to Belos, he does show gratitude and compassion, implying that Flapjack has a good influence on him. He attempts to force Willow and her Flying Derby team to join the Emperor's Coven to prove himself to Darius, but realizes what he is doing is wrong and rescues them, which earns him Darius's respect. Upon finding out, Darius tells Hunter that he is proud that he has made friends his age. Afterwards, he starts to act as Luz's informant within the Emperor's Coven.

In "Hollow Mind", Hunter is transported into Belos' mindscape along with Luz, resulting in him seeing his supposed uncle's true colors first-hand. Despite his initial denial and justification of Belos' true nature and actions, Hunter's devotion to Belos is shattered after he learns of his true origin and goals. Soon after, he flees for his life in fear that Belos would kill him like his predecessors for defying him; he takes refuge in Hexside, where he forms a friendship with Gus while telling the truth behind the Day of Unity to the students and facility. At the end of "King's Tide", Hunter is stranded in the Human Realm with Luz, Amity, Willow and Gus.

In season three, Hunter finds himself comfortable in the Human Realm, discovering new interests and an improved sense of self. However, he ends up possessed by Belos' remains, attacking the others and nearly dying before Flapjack saves him by sacrificing himself. Upon returning to the Boiling Isles, he becomes defensive and struggles with his grief over his palisman, but manages to help Willow, whom he is implied to have a mutual crush on, with her insecurities. Additionally, he discovers that he possesses some of Flapjack's magic, giving him the ability to teleport. In the epilogue, Hunter is seen working as a palisman carver, is now in a relationship with Willow, and has a new Blue Jay palisman named Waffles.

He is confirmed to be bisexual.

=== Lilith Clawthorne ===
Lilith Clawthorne (voiced by Cissy Jones as an adult, Abigail Zoe Lewis as a teen, Dee Bradley Baker in owl beast form) is Eda's estranged older sister and, until the end of season one, leader of the Emperor's Coven. Lilith and Eda have a strained relationship, with Lilith insisting on coming with her to see Emperor Belos. It is implied that she had good intentions for wanting to have Eda come with her when she unknowingly admits to Luz that Eda wanted to join the Emperor's Coven when she was little. Despite their tense relationship, she and Eda do express a longing for some kind of reconciliation. "Agony of a Witch" reveals that she cursed Eda when they were younger in desperate attempt to ensure her acceptance in the Emperor's Coven. This led to Lilith's deal with Emperor Belos after she felt guilty for what she did to her sister. Following Luz's duel with Emperor Belos, Lilith betrays the Emperor to help Luz and uses her magic to split the curse with Eda, resulting in them getting matching split colored eyes.

In season two, Lilith begins living in the Owl House and tries to make amends with Eda. She creates a spell that will allow them to spy into the Emperor's Coven and in the process befriends Hooty, whom she affectionately begins calling "Hootcifer". When she makes a special window to spy on Emperor Belos, she is unaware that Belos knows of it. "Keeping up A-fear-ances" reveals she was ignored by her mother, Gwendolyn, for most of her life; upon her realizing this, they make amends. Lilith decides to leave the Owl House and move back in with her parents. Later, it is shown that she got a job as the assistant curator at the Supernatural Museum of History. She also tries to take on a more confident attitude to be like Eda and impress Luz, with whom she now shares an aunt-niece relationship. She later returns to the Owl House upon learning of the Day of Unity's true results and works with her sister and friends to prevent it. In "O Titan, Where Art Thou", Lilith is shown to be devoted to perceived authority figures, to the point that she disregards other people's feelings. Upon seeing how organized everyone else is within the Emperor's Coven, particularly those who are against it, she begins to realize that she may not have been good at her job. Following the Collector's takeover, she tries to concoct a spell that will free everyone from his spells. In the epilogue, Lilith becomes a teacher and archaeologist at the wild magic school, and is revealed to have unlocked her own harpy form. She is confirmed to be aromantic and asexual.

=== Hieronymus Bump ===
Hieronymus Bump (voiced by Bumper Robinson) is the principal of Hexside School of Magic and Demonics who uses his palisman as his eyes due to being visually impaired. At first glance, he seems imposing and sinister, but is actually pressured by his job as the school principal and the work it requires. He is also seen to be quite reasonable when it comes to changing his mind, and is open-minded despite his stubbornness and morally questionable actions, like when he tries to dissect Luz for trespassing while masquerading as an abomination. In light of Luz being at the school posing as an Abomination, Principal Bump enlists trouble-smelling creatures to act as the school's security staff and throws students into the detention room, where the worms inside trap them in correctional crystals and brainwash them into behaving better. He has a terse relationship with Eda, whom he kept a record of during her time at Hexside. Bump allows Luz to attend Hexside because he ropes Eda into cleaning up the mess she made while she attended. He also agrees with her to keep the deal secret from the Emperor's Coven. "Adventures in the Elements" reveals that he was the young student responsible for defeating the opposing school and helping to build Hexside, as shown in its information pamphlet. In "The First Day", he is shown to place the students in a classroom after discontinuing the Choosy Hat, as it keeps eating the students. Any students that he catches trying to learn something other than their assigned magic are reassigned to the Detention Track. However, by the end of the episode, he becomes more accepting of the students' desire to learn more than one magic type after Luz and the Detention Track Students save the school from a Greater Basilisk using their mixed magic skills. As a result, he allows students the choice to learn more than one magic type. When Emperor Belos announces his intent to petrify Eda, Bump is among the people who disapprove of this, claiming she helped him regain his love of teaching after she left Hexside.

In season two, it is shown that Bump openly enjoys Luz's presence at the school but is forced by the Blights to expel her, Gus, and Willow, despite not wanting to. When they attempt to get back into school, he is upset at having to prevent them from entering, and that he thinks life was dull without them. "Hunting Palismen" reveals that the devil "hat" on his head is actually his palisman Frewin, which allows him to see due to an unspecified incident in his youth. When Frewin is not on his head, Bump is shown to have long black hair, a scar on his right eye, and a closed left eye. In "Them's The Breaks Kid", it is shown that Bump used to be Hexside's vice-principal, where he worked under Faust, but their ideals clash with that of their students. When Adrian Graye and the Emperor's Coven raid Hexside to force the students into joining the Emperor's Coven, Bump is among the teachers and students that take refuge in the Healing Track's homeroom. After the students defeat Graye and the Emperor's Coven, Bump gets them to leave by stating that he would tell Emperor Belos that they were defeated by children. He is captured by the Collector after the events of "King's Tide" and the remaining Hexside students create a statue in his honor, though he is later revived. In the epilogue, Bump has retired from being the principal of Hexside, and is last seen watering his plants, as well as attending Luz’s quinceañera.

=== Camila Noceda ===
Camila Noceda (voiced by Elizabeth Grullon) is Luz's widowed mother, who sends her to summer camp to curb her overactive imagination, but is unaware of her being on the Boiling Isles as she remained in contact via text messages for the first season. She also received letters from Vee, who posed as Luz during summer camp and lives with her soon after. Camila eventually discovers the truth and decides to look after Vee, but is heavily despondent over Luz staying on the Boiling Isles and blames herself for pushing Luz out of her life. "Reaching Out" reveals that she and Luz would collect flowers in remembrance of her husband. She is later seen looking out at the night sky as one star shines brightly. In "King's Tide", she reunites with Luz and meets her friends when she returns home, having escaped into the Human Realm after the Collector is released. In "Thanks to Them," after seeing Belos and learning about how bad her daughter's situation was, she resolves to join her and her friends in the Demon Realm. It is later revealed that she was similar to Luz when she was younger, and sent Luz to camp in a misguided attempt to protect her from what she went through. She is Dominican-American, with Sarah-Nicole Robles saying that she and Luz are a "refreshing representation of a real Hispanic family".

=== Odalia Blight ===
Odalia Blight (voiced by Rachael MacFarlane) is Amity's emotionally abusive and conservative mother, who holds high standards for her, Emira, and Edric. She conditioned Amity into being a candidate for the Emperor's Coven while being willing to remove those she considers a bad influence from her daughter's life. She also runs Blight Industries, which produces abomination-based defense systems. She uses her position as head of Hexside's parent–creature association to have Luz, Willow and Gus expelled from Hexside, only to allow them back in after Amity threatens to destroy her factory. Odalia is later revealed to be aware of the truth behind the Day of Unity, though she does not care what happens as long as she is rewarded with a life of royalty in the Human Realm. When Alador destroys her factory, Odalia flees. She is later seen as one of the survivors of the Collector's takeover, being forced to serve him.

== Antagonists ==
=== Emperor Belos ===
Emperor Belos (voiced by Matthew Rhys) is a mysterious and sinister masked man who is the ruler of the Boiling Isles and the most powerful magic user alive, whom the Emperor's Coven serve. He is later revealed to be Philip Wittebane (voiced by Alex Lawther), a human witch hunter who came to the Boiling Isles centuries ago to find his older brother Caleb, whom he assumed was abducted by witches. This mindset of viewing witches as Evil, caused him to murder Caleb upon learning he fell in love with a witch named Evelyn, before forming a pact with the Collector. Philip took on the new identity of Belos to take manipulate Boiling Isles denizens while using propaganda to against "wild magic" and establish a system for witches to use their magic "the right way". This led to him establishing different Covens along with his Emperor's Coven and sentencing those who are extreme criminals to the process of irreversible petrification. Belos initially used technology as a means to utilize magic while prolonging his life by feeding on palismen essence, granting him power, but also transforming him into an unnatural necrotic monster, forcing him to using mental effort to retain his human appearance. He also concealed his ailment by claiming it to be a curse produced from wild magic. His goal is to invoke the Day of Unity, a convergence of the Human and Demon Realms that would purge wild magic through the current Coven heads he selected. However, its true purpose is to drain magic from the Boiling Isles, killing countless witches and demons in the process, under the delusion that he would be praised by humanity as a hero.

Belos convinced Lilith to join the Emperor's Coven by offering to cure Eda, only to go back on his word while forcing Luz to give him the portal. Although Luz rigs the portal to be destroyed, Belos repairs it and eventually acquires a vial of Titan's Blood to power the portal. Belos also later purchases an army of Abomatons from the Blights to increase his forces for the Day of Unity, with Hunter noting that Belos dislikes anyone establishing an unauthorized private army. In "Yesterday's Lie", it is revealed in Vee's flashbacks that prior to the series premiere, Belos had the Basilisk race resurrected to study their ability to drain magic and personally oversaw the search for those that escaped. In "Follies at the Coven Day Parade", Belos reveals his face to the denizens of Bonesborough while having Terra relay a message to Luz that they would meet again soon and he was looking forward to it. In "Elsewhere and Elsewhen", unaware of Belos's previous identity, Luz and Lilith travel back in time to meet Philip. Upon discovering he had tricked them to contact the Collector, Lilith punches him in the face in retaliation for nearly getting her and Luz killed by the Stonesleeper, which scars him. In "Hollow Mind", Belos appears in a child-like form before Luz and Hunter when they unintentionally enter his mind, using them to subdue the monster of the palismen he consumed before revealing that Hunter is a Grimwalker he plans to dispose for "betrayal". He also reveals his true identity as Philip to Luz, revealing that he orchestrated events to maintain the bootstrap paradox Luz's time travel caused, allowing him to acquire knowledge of the Day of Unity from the Collector.

Belos' plans come to fruition as he reveals he never intended to free the Collector before Luz stops him from returning to the human world by branding him with a sigil in an attempt to force him to cancel the draining spell. He is affected by the Day of Unity, as it causes him to lose control of his body and mutate into his monstrous form, and in rage nearly kills Luz and her friends. His body is obliterated when King frees the Collector, who cancels the draining spell. However, a fragment of Belos lands on Hunter as Luz's group flees the Boiling Isles and ends up in a dilapidated house within the Human Realm, forced to feed on animals and then Hunter like a parasite to reconstruct his failing body before escaping back to the Demon Realm in season three. Still slowly rotting away and unable to find a stable Grimwalker body to inhabit, Belos possesses Raine's puppet body in an attempt to possess the Collector, but fails and instead tricks the Collector into dealing with Luz's group upon learning that he can possess the Titan. While Raine attempts to purge Belos out of their body, he merges with the Titan's heart and gradually infects the Boiling Isles before a Titan-powered Luz defeats him and separates him from the heart. Belos begins to melt due to the boiling rain and unsuccessfully attempts to deceive Luz into helping him again before his remains are stomped to death by Eda, King, and Raine, ending his madness forever.

=== The Collector ===
The Collector (voiced by Fryda Wolff) is a childlike being of immense power who is one of a race of long-lived, powerful beings from beyond the stars who preserve worlds and exterminate troublesome specimens. The Collector disagrees with his kind's methods and desires to befriend other beings, despite his lack of understanding of the impact of death on mortals. The Collector was sent to the Demon World by the Archivists, his older siblings, who learned that the Titans he befriended were immune to their magic. This resulted in the Collector being sealed away with a sphere by King's father after his siblings destroyed most of the latter's kin, placed in the In-Between World that separates the Human and Demon Realms. During the centuries he was trapped, a Titan-hunting cult worshipped him as the "Grand Huntsman", believing him to have been a slayer of Titans. He was discovered and manipulated by Belos, teaching him the spell for the Day of Unity on the condition that he be released and allowed to play again. However, when Belos goes back on his word, the Collector has King release him by agreeing to cancel the Day of Unity. Once freed, the Collector obliterates Belos with the intent of playing "Owl House" with everyone on the Boiling Isles while keeping King by his side because they "pinky swore", deconstructing the head of the Titan and creating the Archive House, a crown-like castle above it.

The Collector takes King as his personal playmate while turning most of the Boiling Isles' residents into puppets. King tries to reason with the Collector upon realizing he is essentially a lonely, misguided child, but Belos, barely alive and possessing Raine's puppet body, convinces the Collector that King is conspiring with Luz and everyone else against him. After placing Luz, Eda and King in several dream scenarios and games, the Collector is disheartened with their resistance and reveals his full story to the trio. Showing sympathy for him, they take him on a tour of the Boiling Isles to the sites of past adventures so they can help him understand true friendship. When Belos possesses the Titan's heart and infects the Boiling Isles, Luz sacrifices her life to save the Collector, who becomes remorseful while realizing the fragility and value of life. After Luz is restored to life by a repentant Titan, the Collector helps keep everyone else and the Archive House safe, and is shown gratitude by Amity once Belos is defeated and destroyed. After restoring everyone under his spell, the Collector decides to return to the stars to do some "growing up", but is encouraged by King to revisit the Isles in the future. He also creates a permanent portal between the Human and Demon Realms for Luz, and returns to put on a light show for her "King-ceañera" party.

Initially a minor character in season 2, The Collector's role was expanded significantly after the crew learned about the show's shortening and had to rewrite the second half of the season.

=== Kikimora ===
Kikimora (voiced by Mela Lee) is Belos' minion and essentially his secretary, often fighting people or giving out orders. Her hair resembles a hand clinging onto her head, and she wears a jacket that covers her mouth; a glimpse of her mouth is shown in "Clouds on the Horizon", showing she has two teeth. She rarely appears in season one, often contacting members of the Emperor's Coven.

In season two, Kikimora shows more of her ruthless side as she uses her dragon in an attempt to murder Hunter and take credit for his mission of retrieving palismen. She fails when Hunter works with Luz to free the palismen and escape without her discovering their identities, but notes that Hunter has an injury matching the one she inflicted on her attacker. Since then, she has considered Hunter to be her workplace arch-rival and seems determined to seek revenge on him than help. Concerned for her job and well-being, she briefly teams up with Luz and her friends so she can escape. However, upon hearing that she might acquire a long-coveted promotion, she turns on them. Plant Coven head Terra Snapdragon reveals that she was testing her loyalty and that the promotion was real, but Kikimora is disappointed to learn that the "promotion" was Belos allowing her to live. She later dispatches the Emperor's Coven to raid the Owl House after he declares its residents wanted criminals. She is revealed to have been demoted to delivery girl for Belos at some point, kidnapping who she assumed was "Hunter", but was actually Luz posing as him through Gus's spell, in hopes of being promoted to a better position. However, after being denied her promotion and learning the truth behind the Day of Unity, Kikimora helps King reach the Collector to get back at Belos.

In season three, following the Collector's takeover, Kikimora influences Boscha to rule the survivors with an iron fist in disguise under the alias "Miki," and as well as disguising her mech as her sister “Roka”, mainly so that she can get back at Luz when she returns. Luz, Camila, and their friends manage to convince Boscha and the rest of the school to turn on her, resulting in her defeat once again. In the epilogue, Kikimora is seen helping to rebuild the Boiling Isles, possibly as penance for her misdeeds.

=== Other antagonists ===
- Warden Wrath (voiced by Roger Craig Smith) is a monstrous and brutal demon who works as the prison warden at the Conformatorium, where those who are different are imprisoned. He has a crush on Eda, who has always managed to evade his capture. Despite his large, intimidating appearance, he is actually quite cowardly. It is later revealed that he was demoted for stealing lunches when interrogated by Eda about the Day of Unity.
- Adegast (voiced by Robin Atkin Downes) is an octopus-like puppeteer demon who preys on those who feel that they are special by using lifelike puppets. These puppets include a kindly wizard (Adegast's default puppet), a cat named Chris (voiced by Arin Hanson), a fairy princess (voiced by Eden Riegel), and a handsome young man named Nevareth (voiced by Billy Kametz). He was shrunken down and eaten by Eda.
- Tibblet-Tibblie "Tibbles" Grimm Hammer III (voiced by Parvesh Cheena) is a pig-like demon. He is a capitalist, night market stand owner, and con artist. Following his first appearance, he develops a grudge against the inhabitants of the Owl House and those associated with them. His schemes have devolved into selling human objects to witches.
- The Demon Hunters are a group of humanoids who hunt wild demons. They were first seen trying to catch a transformed Hooty in "Hooty's Moving Hassle". They later work as animal control officers as a way to make ends meet, and tried to catch Eda's owl monster form.
  - Patch (voiced by Kevin Michael Richardson) is the leader of the Demon Hunters, who wears an eyepatch. He takes his job seriously, yet struggles to keep his associates under control.
  - Tom (voiced by Kevin Michael Richardson) is another member of the Demon Hunters. He tries to come off bigger than he actually is.
- Roselle (voiced by Grey Griffin) and Dottie (voiced by Cissy Jones) are two elder ladies who take in stray animals and pamper them until they are brainwashed. They despise teenagers.
- Piniet (voiced by André Sogliuzzo) is a lizard man-like publisher who accepts writers, but traps them in tiny cubes so that they can write content for him forever. He seems to have becomes slightly softer since Tiny Nose shared her book with him, titled "My Stowy".
- Merchant (voiced by Jake Green) is an unnamed demon scammer who tricks people into going into the forest on a wild-goose chase so he could steal their youth for himself. He tries to trick both Eda and Lilith, but is beaten up by them.
- The Greater Basilisk (voiced by April Stewart) is one of the Basilisks that Belos resurrected to study her kind's ability to drain magic, only for her to escape captivity. The Great Basilisk poses as an inspector for the Emperor's Coven to sneak into schools and feed on the residents' magic before being defeated by Luz and the Detention Track students when she infiltrated Hexside. The Emperor's Coven denied any knowledge of the Greater Basilisk posing as one of their inspectors, causing Principal Bump to file a complaint to them.
- Grometheus "Grom" is a monster underneath Hexside that is known as the Fear Bringer, as it assumes the form of someone's worst fear. Every year, a student must battle and defeat Grom to protect the school.
- Wortlop (voiced by Gary Anthony Williams) is a gremlin con artist who, alongside his accomplices, posed as a four-armed healing master. He scammed anyone who sought him out for cures, like he did with Gwendolyn Clawthorne. When Luz's claim of Wortlop being a fraud is proven to be true, Gwendolyn drives them away in revenge.
- Jacob Hopkins (voiced by Roger Craig Smith) is a human conspiracy theorist who believes in demons and witches, but has wildly skewed ideas of what they want or what they do. Believing they want to harvest humans and suspecting that they came from Mars, he captures Vee and plans to dissect her, but Luz directs Camila to knock him out and rescue her. Sometime afterwards, he lost his job at the museum and is now seen as a laughingstock by the whole town.
- The Titan Trappers are a group living beyond the Boiling Isles. They worship the Collector as "the Grand Huntsman" and dedicate their lives to slaying Titans.
  - Bill (voiced by Chris Houghton) is the elderly leader of the Titan Trappers, whose eardrums were damaged following an encounter with a Titan. Upon learning that King is a Titan, Bill attempts to kill him to earn the Collector's favor while being apathetic to the rest of his people.
  - Tarak (voiced by Kevin Michael Richardson) is a Titan Trapper who was interested in King, assuming him to be the child of a fellow Titan Trapper. He wrote a letter to him which he asked Hooty to deliver, only for it to later get eaten by him when a bug got on it, which Hooty assumed was junk mail. While he does bond with King upon finally meeting him, he ultimately turns on him after learning that he was a Titan.

== Others ==
- Katya (voiced by Grey Griffin) is a witch in the Bard Coven who was put in the Conformatorium for writing fan fiction about vegetables falling in love. She reappears in "Eda's Requiem", which reveals that she is part of the BATS, then in "O Titan, Where Art Thou", where she has since joined the CATS.
- Tinella "Tiny Nose" Nosa (voiced by Dana Terrace) is a small round demon and conspiracy theorist with a thirst for destruction. She speaks with an unusual rhotacism with her r's replaced with w's. At the end of "Sense and Insensitivity", she gets a book published. However, she is also shown to be employed by Tibbles. She is physically based on Terrace's self-caricature.
- Snaggleback (voiced by Arin Hanson) is a pink monkey-like creature with a spiky shell who is nervous and shy around others. King thought he was a ferocious monster, but upon seeing him in person, King learned the truth and had to rewrite the facts about him in his demon book. He sometimes takes part in social events, such as acting like a disco ball for Grom.
- Steve (voiced by Alex Hirsch in season 1 and Matt Chapman in Season 2 onwards) is a former Coven scout. When unmasked, he is shown to have a humanoid face and a horn on the right side of his head. Despite formerly working under Belos, he has no qualms about being casual with the Owl House, particularly Lilith, whom he is friends with. Over time, he begins to have doubts about joining the Coven. Later on, he acquires a motorcycle and meets up with King, whom he bonds with, before joining the rebellion against Belos. He is revealed to be Matt's half-brother.
- Morton (voiced by Shannon McKain) is a teenager who runs the elixir shop that Eda frequents. He takes his job seriously.
- Braxas (voiced by Kevin Locarro) is a young bipedal demon with a large mouth, no eyes, and a deep voice who is a visitor to the Bonesborough Library. He is later revealed to be the son of Warden Wrath.
- Alador Blight (voiced by Jim Pirri) is Amity's aloof, henpecked, and inattentive father who holds her, Emira, and Edric to high standards along with his wife. He creates various abominations for Blight Industries. He is easily distracted but observant, as he realizes that Luz, Willow and Gus have made Amity a much better witch than they could have possibly imagined, and is more empathetic and moral than his wife. "Reaching Out" reveals that he was a Bonesborough Brawl champion. While trying to stop Amity from taking part in the fight, he learns that she never wanted to be part of the Emperor's Coven or any coven and comes to respect her. Alador eventually stands up to Odalia upon learning of the Day of Unity and discovering that she knew of its true nature, siding with his daughter and her friends, before being separated from them during the Day Of Unity, until Amity reunites with him after Belos is defeated.
- Vee / Number 5 (voiced by Michaela Dietz) is a young Basilisk and a member of the basilisk race that Belos had resurrected to research their magic-absorbing and shapeshifting abilities. Vee escaped captivity and snuck into the human world while witnessing Luz's arrival to the Boiling Isles, assuming Luz's appearance and identity. While Vee has mixed feelings over Luz running away from a loving home, she was grateful for the opportunity to be loved and is later accepted as family by Camila after she learns the truth. Following Luz's return to the human world, Vee altered her human appearance to differentiate herself from Luz while resembling her enough to pass as a relative. In the epilogue, Vee finally graduates high school with Luz.
- Perry Porter (voiced by Gary Anthony Williams) is Gus' father, who works as a reporter for BBN-HXN.
- Captain Salty (voiced by Steve Blum) is the captain of a ship that is secretly owned by the Emperor's Coven. He later transports Luz, Hooty, and King to where King's supposed family resides. It is later mentioned that Captain Salty's crew took up employment elsewhere.
- Gilbert (voiced by Eric Bauza) and Harvey Park (voiced by Matt Chapman) are Willow's fathers, who love her unconditionally. Harvey is dark-skinned, seemingly overly protective, and has high expectations for her. Gilbert Park is lighter-skinned, is more easygoing, and is aware of her adventurous outings.
- Jean-Luc is a strange amorphous creature that was stationed in a tower where Eda found King. He was at first considered antagonistic, but is later revealed to be protecting King for an unknown purpose. He is only active inside the tower and becomes inactive outside of it.
- Gwendolyn "Gwen" Clawthorne (voiced by Deb Doetzer) is Eda and Lilith's mother, who had high aspirations for her daughters until the curse split them apart. She was more attentive to Eda than Lilith when trying to find those who can cure Eda's curse, which drove a wedge in their relationship, and had unknowingly resorted to fake holistic practices to cure her daughter. She eventually realizes that she has not been a good mother and makes amends.
- Malphas (voiced by Fred Tatasciore) is Amity's boss at the Bonesborough Library. He takes on the appearance of a cold and intimidating spectral energy, but is actually a very down to earth and matter-of-fact individual who cares about his job. His name and appearance are inspired by the demon of the same name in the Pseudomonarchia Daemonum.
- Keeper of the Looking Glass Ruins (voiced by Christopher Swindle) is an unnamed old man who uses illusions. He is the eccentric guardian of the Looking Glass Ruins and sees great potential in Gus. After encountering him, Mattholomule remarks that he is "definitely a ghost."
- Amber (voiced by Kari Wahlgren) is a short-tempered member of the BATS. She has pink skin and animal-like ears, and takes to calling Eda her "mommy", who is apparently unaware that she was not being literal.
- Derwin (voiced by Zeno Robinson) is a member of the BATS. He is seemingly close with Katya.
- Dell Clawthorne (voiced by Peter Gallagher) is Eda and Lilith's father and Gwen's husband, who Eda looked up to. Flashbacks reveal that Eda accidentally wounded him during her cursed transformation. "Elsewhere and Elsewhen" reveals that carving palismen is a Clawthorne family tradition, one he can no longer do because of tremors from his injuries. He has no negative feelings towards Eda and offers that she continue his line of work.
- Flora D'esplora (voiced by Eileen Galindo) is a "bad girl historian" and Lilith's former mentor when she was in the Emperor's Coven. Her name and appearance are a reference to Dora the Explorer.
- Masha (voiced by Grey Griffin) is one of Vee's friends in the human realm, who takes over the Gravesfield Historical Society. They are non-binary.

=== Hexside faculty members ===
Besides Principal Bump, the following are faculty members at Hexside School of Magic and Demonics:

- Professor Hermonculus (voiced by JB Blanc) is a teacher who is in charge of the students in the Abomination Track. He is often seen being carried by his own abomination.
- Hexside Guards (voiced by Dee Bradley Baker and Kevin Michael Richardson) are a group of unidentified creatures with upside-down skulls who work as the security guards of Hexside. They patrol the halls and keep the order in Hexside.
- Faust (voiced by Eric Bauza) is a demon who resembles a bull. He has the ability to shoot fire from his head, and is the predecessor to Principal Bump, who was originally his assistant. He is cruel and strict, expelling students for inconsequential behavior like "chewing too loudly".

=== Hexside students ===
The following attend Hexside School of Magic and Demonics:

- Boscha (voiced by Eden Riegel) is a three-eyed witch, who is obsessed with Penstagram. She is part of the Potions Track. Unknown to Boscha, Amity only hung out with her because their parents are acquaintances, and Amity never liked Boscha or considered her as her true friend. She is very condescending and bullies others based on their magical prowess or social status. Boscha is also the Grudgby captain of her school and was unwilling to let others see Willow as an accomplished witch. Since then, Boscha has become petty and craves attention, even from those she dislikes. She is hinted to have two mothers in the episode "Them's the Breaks, Kid", as there are two Hexside students who resemble her. Following the Collector's takeover, her friends are turned into puppets and she begins to rule the survivors in Hexside while being influenced by Kikimora. She is later revealed to be desperate to earn back Amity's friendship, but a stern talk from her convinces her to lead the school in turning on Kikimora. In the epilogue, Boscha now sells Grudgby gear.
- Emira "Em" and Edric "Ed" Blight (voiced by Erica Lindbeck and Ryan O'Flanagan) are Amity's older twin siblings and members of the illusion track. They are troublemakers who pick on her, like when they tried to steal her diary to show it at school. However, they do acknowledge when they have messed up and are willing to make it up to her. Edric fears being alone, while Emira fears being stuck with him forever. Like Amity, they hate being controlled by their parents. They are also shown to become much more supportive of Amity and are aware of her attraction to Luz. "Reaching Out" reveals that they wear concealment stones to hide their acne and puberty transitioning appearances. Furthermore, Edric begins to embrace wild magic, revealing that he is much more talented than he lets on. In "Labyrinth Runners", they join additional tracks in school, with Emira in healing and Edric in beast keeping and potions.
- Matt Tholomule, also called Matty or Mattholomule (voiced by Jorge Diaz) is Luz and Gus's new rival and part of the Construction Track. He originally attended Glandus High, where he constantly got in trouble and in detention. Mattholomule eventually transferred to Hexside, becoming the new president of H.A.S. after Luz destroyed the detention room, which Gus took the blame for. "Through the Looking Glass Ruins" reveals that while attending Glandus, he had been treated poorly by the students there. After Gus is betrayed by his friends from Glandus, Mattholomule starts to feel guilty and helps him get back at his former classmates, befriending him in the process. However, he is shown to be employed by Tibbles, though he is most likely not getting paid. "Labyrinth Runners" reveals he is also taking the illusions track. It is later revealed that his full name is "Matt Tholomule".
- Viney (voiced by Ally Maki) is a witch from the Detention Track who wished to study the Healing and Beast-Keeping Tracks. She joins Willow's Flyer Derby team, but her friendship with Jerbo is put in conflict when he joins the opposing team.
- Jerbo (voiced by Noah Galvin) is a witch from the Detention Track who wished to study the Plant and Abomination Tracks. His friendship with Viney is put into conflict when he accidentally joins the opposing Flying Derby team.
- Barcus is a human-faced dog from the Detention Track who wished to study the Oracle and Potion Tracks. Barcus mostly speaks in dog language.
- Amelia (voiced by Eden Riegel) is a witch and one of Boscha's friends. She is part of the Plant Track and is on Boscha's Grudgby team.
- Skara (voiced by Kimberly Brooks) is a witch and one of Boscha's friends. She is part of the Bard Track. While she can be bossy and mean, she does show a friendlier side and does not appear as malicious as the rest of Boscha's, formally Amity's, troupe. She has since become closer to Willow.
- Cat (voiced by Grey Griffin) is a witch and one of Boscha's friends. She is part of the Healing Track and is on Boscha's Grudgby team. In "Labyrinth Runners", she heals Willow's injured arm.
- Eileen (voiced by Kimberly Brooks) is a cycloptic student of the Biped Demon classification on the Potions Track. She is always running a stand and looks bored. She can "speak", but it is muffled as she has no mouth due to her one eye taking up most of her head. She is apparently interested in humans.
- Bo is a witch on the Healing Track who is friends with Skara.
- Selene is a witch on the Oracle Track who is recognizable by her crescent moon-shaped head and single eyeball. She appears shy, but is friends with Boscha.

=== Glandus students ===
The following students attend Glandus High:

- Bria (voiced by Felicia Day) is a witch on the Construction Track. She has a perky and upbeat attitude that hides a passive-aggressive nature. She is the leader of her trio of friends and will do anything to advance her own magic.
- Gavin (voiced by Nik Dodani) is a witch on the Abomination Track. He is friendly, but hides his issues with his father as he wants to impress him.
- Angmar (voiced by Harvey Guillén) is a yellow cat-like demon witch on the Plant Track. He is laid back, but gets distracted by butterflies.

=== Palismen ===
Palismen are magical totems that sit on top of a witch's staff and act as their familiar. Each palisman is acquired by their witches through their educations at their respective magic schools. Among known palismen are:

- Bat Queen (voiced by Isabella Rossellini) is a large bat-like being who has children of her own and lives in a cave. She once asked Eda to look after them, and was so pleased that she leaves them with a treasure chest and whistle. It is later revealed that she is a palisman that was formerly owned by a giant and looks after other forgotten and broken palismen.
- Owlbert is Eda's owl palisman. He is usually perched atop his place on her staff, but can come to life and move about on his own. He was initially afraid of Luz after she accidentally cracked his head, but learned to forgive her. Owlbert was handmade by Eda.
- Lilith's palisman is a white raven/crow with blue eyes, which is almost always seen on top of her staff.
- Hawksley is Gwendolyn's hawk palisman.
- Clover is Willow's bee palisman that she acquires in "Hunting Palismen". She answers to Willow's "tender, yet tenacious" personality.
- Emmiline Bailey Marcostimo is Gus's blue chameleon palisman that he acquires in "Hunting Palismen". He answers Gus' want to be an ambassador to the human realm and re-establish contact with the giraffes, which Eda earlier mentioned were from their world.
- Frewin is Bump's small red devil palisman. He is usually perched on Bump's head and over his eyes to help him see.
- Maya is Boscha's crab palisman that she acquires in "Hunting Palismen". She matches with her competitive spirit.
- Viney's palisman is Viney's Manticore palisman that she acquires in "Hunting Palismen". He answers her for wanting to open a veterinary clinic for mythical pets.
- Flapjack is Hunter's cardinal palisman introduced in "Hunting Palismen". He is a small one-eyed cardinal that initially hangs onto Luz for the majority of her adventure with Hunter. Following Hunter risking his job to save him, he chooses him to be his owner, much to Hunter's confusion. He eventually embraces him in "Eclipse Lake". "King's Tide" reveals that he originally belonged to Caleb, Philip Wittebane's brother. In "Thanks to Them", he is mortally wounded by a Belos-possessed Hunter, and after Belos leaves Hunter's body to retreat to the Demon Realm, Flapjack sacrifices his life to revive him.
- Waffle is Hunter's new palisman introduced in the credits scene in "Watching and Dreaming".
- Ghost is Amity's cat palisman. She is based on Dana Terrace's real-life cat with the same name.
- Stringbean is Luz's palisman, originally carved as a simple egg with the intention of letting the palisman choose what it wants its own form to be. It remains unhatched and unnamed for several episodes. In "For the Future", it responds to Luz's realization that her deepest desire is to be understood and hatches into the form of a "snake-shifter".

=== Coven Heads ===
The following are the heads of the different Covens:

- Raine Whispers (voiced by Avi Roque as an adult and Blu del Barrio as a teenager) is the Head of the Bard Coven who is also Eda's childhood friend and romantic interest, before Eda pushed them away due to her curse. Raine leads a small team of rebels called the Bards Against the Throne, aka the BATS. They also suffer from stage fright, despite being musically gifted. Raine is later captured due to being needed for the Day of Unity. Raine is next seen apparently under the influence of a concoction brewed by Terra Snapdragon that makes them obedient to Belos and unable to recall their reunion with Eda, despite sympathizing with her. This is later revealed to be a ruse since Raine has the ability to alter drinks via whistling into them, working in secret with Darius to stop Belos while deciding not to involve Eda in their plan to keep her safe. After the Owl House residents join them, Raine renames their group the Covens Against the Throne (CATS for short). which Darius did not agree on the name for. Raine has an illusion-disguised Eda take their place during their part of the Day of Unity with the Coven Heads. An Abomaton found them with Lilith and Hooty while Terra discovered that that Raine with them is not the real Raine; Raine was then positioned in their planned spot. Raine is then nearly killed by the draining spell until the Collector deactivated it. After being turned into a puppet by the Collector, Raine is eventually possessed by Belos in the latter's attempt to possess the Collector. Raine breaks the Collector's spell over them and purges Belos out of their body, but Belos possesses the Titan's heart despite their attempts to stop him. However, Raine is later saved by Luz's group, helping Eda and King kill Belos, and in the epilogue Raine gains a fox palisman. Raine is Disney's first non-binary character.
- Darius Deamonne (voiced by Keston John) is the narcissistic Head of the Abomination Coven who can turn into an abomination, and appears to be less interested in the loyalty of those on the Boiling Isles. Darius also despises Alador Blight, whom he considers to be an Abomination hack in light of him being behind them. Darius was also a pupil of the previous Golden Guard, initially finding Hunter a nuisance before expressing respect towards him for opposing him to save the friends he made during his coven recruitment mission at Hexside. Darius is later revealed to secretly oppose Belos's plans alongside Eberwolf, joining forces with Raine after capturing them to maintain his cover. He appears as a member of the CATS, which Darius did not agree on the name for. During the Day of Unity, Darius takes part in his mission with the CATS where he, Eberwolf, and a disguised Eda partake in the Coven Head's part of the festival. Their plot is discovered by Terra Snapdragon, and the three of them are subdued by the other Coven Heads, with the real Raine having been brought in upon Lilith and Hooty's capture. Darius is nearly killed by the draining spell until the Collector deactivates it. After being restored from being turned into a puppet, Darius convinces the immoral Coven Head members to not consider taking over the Boiling Isles.
- Eberwolf (voiced by Kari Wahlgren) is the humanoid beast-like Head of the Beast Keeping Coven, who is of indeterminate gender. They can become ferocious and display some child-like behavior. They are later revealed to be working alongside Raine and Darius to take down Belos and stop the Day of Unity. During the Day of Unity, Darius takes part in their mission with the CATS where they, Darius, and a disguised Eda partake in the Coven Head's part of the festival. Their plot was discovered by Terra Snapdragon, and the three of them are subdued by the other Coven Heads, with the real Raine having been brought in upon Lilith and Hooty's capture. Eberwolf is nearly killed by the draining spell until the Collector deactivates it.
- Terra Snapdragon (voiced by Debra Wilson) is the intimidating and sadistic Head of the Plant Coven who has control of all plants, including a flower she uses to make tea for Raine to keep them in a foggy state of mind. She is in charge of keeping Raine from rebelling and was assigned to test Kikimora's loyalty; she is also shown to be loyal to Emperor Belos. After learning that the Raine with them is not the real Raine, Terra has Adrian remove the illusion, exposing that Eda had been posing as Raine. She and the other Coven Heads subdue Eda, Darius, and Eberwolf as an Abomaton brings the real Raine in. After the draining spell takes hold over her, she is horrified to realize that her loyalty to Belos was misplaced, nearly ending in her own demise and the mass-genocide of the witch race until the Collector stops the spell. In "For the Future", she is forced to participate in the Collector's role play to avoid being turned into a puppet, but is transformed after insulting King. After being restored, Darius stops Terra and some of her fellow Coven Heads from considering taking over the Boiling Isles.
- Adrian Graye Vernworth (voiced by Noshir Dalal) is the mischievous and egotistical Head of the Illusionist Coven, who has a prehensile lion-like tail. He tries to get all the Hexside students to have one coven before the Day of Unity. He later tries to find the Looking Glass Graveyard by going through Gus' memories, but ends up getting trapped in his own memories; he is later knocked out by scouts who fled when Principal Bump threatened to mention that they were defeated by children. After Terra Snapdragon learns that the Raine with them during the Day of Unity was an impostor, she has Adrian remove the illusion and expose that Eda had been posing as Raine, and helps subdue Eda, Darius, and Eberwolf. Adrian is nearly killed by the draining spell before the Collector deactivates it. After being restored from being turned into a puppet, Darius stops Adrian and some of his fellow Coven Heads from considering taking over the Boiling Isles.
