= Clouds on the Horizon =

- The Owl House episode
- Title card
- Episode no.: Season 2 Episode 20
- Directed by: Bosook Coburn
- Story by: Dana Terrace; Emmy Cicierega; Mikki Crisostomo; Madeleine Hernandez; Zach Marcus; John Bailey Owen
- Teleplay by: Emmy Cicierega; Madeleine Hernandez
- Production code: 450H-220
- Original air date: May 21, 2022
- Running time: 22 minutes

Guest appearances
- Mela Lee as Kikimora; Keston John as Darius; Jim Pirri as Alador Blight; Rachael MacFarlane as Odalia Blight; Erica Lindbeck as Emira Blight; Ryan O'Flanagan as Edric Blight; Matt Chapman as Steve; Grey DeLisle as Katya; Fryda Wolff as The Collector

Episode chronology
← Previous "O Titan, Where Art Thou"	Next → "King's Tide"

"Clouds on the Horizon" is the 20th and penultimate episode of the second season of the American animated television series The Owl House. In the episode, the Covens Against the Throne try to find a way to stop the Day of Unity, which would essentially kill all life on the Boiling Isles. The plan follows Eda Clawthorne taking over Raine Whispers' place as Bard Coven Head, while Luz and her friends try to stop Abomaton production.

The episode premiered on May 21, 2022, on Disney Channel and garnered 0.34 million viewers when it premiered.

The episode received critical attention for featuring the first same-sex kiss in a Disney property, between two of the main characters, Luz Noceda and Amity Blight.

== Plot ==
As Emperor Belos is preparing a portal to the Human Realm, the Collector wonders if it has changed since Belos has left it and mocks him for barely being able to keep his human form. After Belos tries and fails to attack him, the Collector complains that the emperor had not kept with his promises. Belos tells him to be patient, as the Day of Unity will begin soon.

Meanwhile, Alador worries about the consequences of the increased supply of Abomatons to Belos, but Odalia brushes the worries off. At the same time, Amity, Edric, and Emira try to sneak out of Blight Manor, their house to try and sabotage Abomaton production. However, Edric and Emira are caught by an Abomaton for trying to burn down one of the abomination factories, and Odalia eventually grounds the aforementioned three.

At the Covens Against the Throne's (CAT) hideout, the crew try and figure out how to stop the Day of Unity within 24 hours, where Belos would use a draining spell to exterminate all life on the Boiling Isles. Eda Clawthorne brings up that while the spell can't be stopped, it can be stopped through warping the spell itself. The group comes up with the plan to have Eda replace Raine Whispers as Bard Coven Head so her curse will disrupt the spell, but is worried that she would have to gain a sigil. In the process, Luz Noceda completes a palisman, which she carves into an egg, wanting the palisman to decide its own future.

As the CAT crew board an airship, Eda encourages Luz to go see Amity. Luz meets Willow Park, Gus Porter, and Hunter. Hunter, who is ordered to protect Luz from orders from his mentor Darius Deamonne, asks Luz not to tell Willow and Gus that he is a Grimwalker. Afterwards, the group arrives at Blight Manor to see Amity. Luz meets Amity in the latter's room and share a romantic moment together, with Luz promising a peaceful date in the future and Amity reaching in for a kiss afterwards.

Meanwhile, Eda is prepared to take Raine's place as Bard Coven Head. Raine is initially worried as Eda would never be able to perform wild magic again, but eventually Raine agrees to the plan and Eda is branded with the sigil.

Luz, Amity, Hunter, Willow, and Gus attempt to infiltrate Blight Industries to halt Abomaton production. While standing guard, King eventually has a conversation with Alador, who complains about how poorly his wife has treated him since their marriage, and how he wants to take better care of his kids. King then reveals the truth about the Day of Unity to Alador.

While trying to infiltrate Alador's room, the crew are caught by Odalia. Amity begs to Odalia to stop as all witches would essentially die, but Odalia remains unfazed and ignorant to the claim. Odalia traps the crew, and Kikimora, Belos' assistant, reveals that the Emperor's Coven knew about the CAT's plan. Immediately afterwards, with the little help of King, Alador breaks in, fighting Odalia, who reveals she knew about Belos' genocidal intentions and the true nature of the Day of Unity, supporting it due to Belos tricking her into thinking that she will be spared and rewarded with a life of royalty. Kikimora captures Hunter, while Alador, utterly disgusted with his wife's betrayal of their people, destroys every Abomaton, the Blight Industries building itself, and the production line, while Amity disowns her. As the crew board the airship, it is revealed that "Hunter" is actually Luz due to an illusion spell, with Kikimora on her way to Belos with Luz.

== Production ==
According to Rebecca Bozza, an associate production crew member for the show, a scene which featured Hunter trying to join Luz into Blight Manor to see Amity was cut. The scene had featured Hunter being stopped by Willow and Gus to let Luz kiss Amity alone, to the displeasure of Hunter. Willow and Gus eventually explain that Luz and Amity deserved a moment together alone, and that Hunter would understand "when he's older", despite Hunter being the oldest of the crew.

== Critical reception ==
Lee Arvoy, writer for TV Source Magazine, would praise the episode for being a good lead-in into the season finale, praising the relationship between Emperor Belos and The Collector, Luz and Amity's kiss, and Raine Whispers and Eda Clawthorne's relationship.

=== Luz and Amity kiss scene ===
Luz Noceda (right) and Amity Blight (left) sharing a kiss. The scene marked the first time a same-sex kiss involving the main character had been featured in any Disney property.

Near the end of the episode, two of the show's main characters, Luz Noceda and Amity Blight, share a kiss after Luz promises Amity a date once the Day of Unity is over. The scene marked the first same-sex kiss in a Disney Channel show or animated series. The scene received praise for showcasing a same-sex kiss, with many praising the show's progressiveness in children's television. TheGamer writer Jade King wrote that the scene, along with the show itself was a trailblazer in children's television in terms of acceptance of same-sex love in media, saying "The Owl House has established itself as one of the most progressive animated shows in history, and will be looked back on alongside a handful of other trailblazers as a moment where things began to change. Where who you are, what you look like, and who you fall in love with isn't a point of contention in media, but an aspect of normalcy. Luz and Amity's relationship is a cornerstone of that message, and it reached a new crescendo in this week's episode." Heather Hogan, writer for the LGBTQ+ magazine Autostraddle would praise show creator Dana Terrace, saying "there was no doubt in my mind that creator Dana Terrace was going to fist fight Mickey Mouse to make this happen... unlike other cartoons that have paved the way with their kissing queers this one is geared toward even younger audiences. Most of the time, Disney is too afraid to even casually mention a straight character has some gay off-screen parents. Terrace has pushed them to be exactly who they need to be right now."
