= For the Future (The Owl House) =

- The Owl House episode
- A promotional poster for the episode, made by Andy Garner-Flexner.
- Episode no.: Season 3 Episode 2
- Directed by: Amelia Lorenz; Bridget Underwood
- Story by: Dana Terrace; Luz Batista; Emmy Cicierega; Mikki Crisostomo; Madeleine Hernandez; Zach Marcus; John Bailey Owen
- Teleplay by: Mikki Crisostomo; Madeleine Hernandez; Zach Marcus; John Bailey Owen
- Production code: 450H-302
- Original air dates: January 21, 2023 (Disney Channel & Disney XD)
- Running time: 48 minutes

Guest appearances
- Mela Lee as Kikimora; Eden Riegel as Boscha and Mary; Jorge Diaz as Matt Tholomule; Kimberly Brooks as Skara, Eileen and Bat Student; Rachael MacFarlane as Odalia Blight; Erica Lindbeck as Emira Blight; Ryan O'Flanagan as Edric Blight; Ally Maki as Viney; Noah Galvin as Jerbo; Debra Wilson as Terra Snapdragon

Episode chronology
| ← Previous "Thanks to Them" | Next → "Watching and Dreaming" |

"For the Future" is the second and penultimate episode of the third season of the American animated television series The Owl House, and the 42nd overall episode of the series. In the episode, Luz Noceda, her friends Amity, Willow, Gus, Hunter, and Luz’s mother, Camila, who have all headed back to the Boiling Isles, now changed from the last time they have visited. On two separate journeys, Luz and Belos hope to battle The Collector, with both suffering battles along the way.

The episode premiered on January 21, 2023 on both Disney Channel and Disney XD, and garnered a combined total of 442,000 viewers on its premiere. It received relative praise from critics for its animation, writing, use of time, character development, and emotional themes.

== Plot ==
External videos
- The Owl House Season 3 Episode 2 For the Future Full Episode @disneychannelanimation — Official upload of the episode onto YouTube

Continuing from the events of "King's Tide" in the Boiling Isles, after successfully forcing Luz Noceda and her friends into the Human Realm, King Clawthorne tries to explain to The Collector the rules of "Owl House". Lilith Clawthorne and Hooty try to save King but are turned into puppets by The Collector along with most residents of the Boiling Isles.

Months later, continuing from the events of "Thanks to Them", Luz, her girlfriend, Amity Blight, their friends Willow, Gus, Hunter, and Luz's mother, Camila, arrive in the Boiling Isles. Luz and the group stop at the Owl House, which has been abandoned. Camila seeks advice from Gus and Willow about how to help Luz and talks to Willow about bottling up her emotions, which Willow denies doing. Meanwhile, Emperor Belos struggles to keep his shape as he tries to find a way to regain power.

The group follows a shooting star carrying The Collector and King to the now-abandoned Bonesborough, which The Collector has turned into a large playground to play with his puppets. After a round of playing, The Collector and King fly off to the Archive House to get Eda, the only citizen The Collector keeps that has not turned into a puppet. King learns of The Collector's race, the Archivists, whom travel the cosmos forcibly perceiving life while destroying those who resist. Afterwards, Luz's group spot a group of students from Hexside Academy and join the surviving students led by Boscha, who refuses to help Luz rescue the citizens from the Archive House. Mattholomule and Luz's group search Luz' memories to find a teleportation spell that Phillip used to get into the skull of the Titan, hoping to reach the Archive House. Willow unsuccessfully tries to comfort Hunter and leaves the room distraught. Gus and Hunter follow her, and they are ambushed by Boscha and Kikimora, who, with her Abomatron, had been posing as refugees and became Boscha's advisor.

At the same time, Belos heads to his old hideout spot to heal. At the Archive House, King finds Hooty, who is still a puppet and reunites with Eda while The Collector sleeps. The two leave and meet with Lilith, who escaped into hiding thanks to King, thus giving her the Hooty puppet. Belos possesses the puppet of Raine Whispers and convinces The Collector that King is plotting to imprison him again. The Collector eavesdrops on King, Eda, and Lilith and believes the idea to be true after hearing that they learned that a Titain's power can nullify an Archivist's, not hearing King's true intentions to talk with him peacefully.

Boscha and Kikimora put Luz, Amity, Camila, and Mattholomule in a deep pit. Kikimora, wanting to seek revenge against Luz, attacks the group. Amity and Mattholomule run into Boscha, who pleads with Amity to join the leadership council. Amity refuses the offer and tries to convince Boscha to help them rescue her friends. Meanwhile, Luz and Camila retreat into the local woods, where Luz is frustrated about messing up again, and admits she does not want to leave the Demon Realm. Camila reminds her that messing up is a part of life, relating all her mistakes, and apologizing for her greatest one: trying to change Luz into someone she wasn't. Luz realizes that all she wanted was to be understood, causing her palisman egg to finally hatch.

In another pit made of vines, Willow suffers an extreme nervous breakdown, losing control of her magic. Hunter and Gus manage to calm her down. They let Willow vent about her frustrations, and Hunter admits to her how important the group is to him. As the pit caves in, the three escape and regroup with Luz and Camila, who are being attacked by Kikimora. Amity, now joined by Boscha and the rest of the students at Hexside, join in the fight and overrun Kikimora. Luz, Camila, and their friends succeed in creating the teleportation spell and arrive at the Titan's skull. There, Luz discovers that her palisman is a shape-shifting serpent whom she names Stringbean. As The Collector looks on, Belos' words convince him that Luz has come to assist King in defeating him. He frowns and declares that he wants to play a "new game", and snaps his fingers.

== Promotion ==
On January 5, a promotional poster was released on show creator Dana Terrace's social media accounts. Writer Jade King speculated that the Boiling Isles had been left somewhat intact, along with speculating that Luz and Camila had newfound motivation.

== Release ==
The episode officially premiered on January 21, 2023, on both Disney Channel and Disney XD. However, the full episode was leaked two weeks earlier on January 5, when video on demand service iTunes Canada had accidentally released the episode, leading to the episode being downloaded by users who had purchased the episode, who then proceeded to spread the episode across social media. A similar instance had happened with the Amphibia episode "True Colors". In a series of now-deleted tweets, show creator Dana Terrace expressed frustration at The Walt Disney Company and iTunes for the leak, saying "I'm so fucking tired... when your own damn company just uploads shit by accident."

== Critical reception ==
Jade King, writer for TheGamer, would praise the episode for its emotional and narrative weight. Jermall Keels, writer for Comic Book Resources, praised how the episode showed the effects of isolation. Heather Hogan, writer for Autostraddle, praised how the episode was able to give almost all of the main characters one final character arc before the finale. Avani Goswami, writer for The Pop Break, wrote that "'For the Future' is done incredibly well in that it gives us character development – like Willow allowing herself to feel her emotions – and grows relationships, like Willow and Hunter's budding romance. It also explores the idea that the Collector, despite the pain he has caused, is not all evil and is also just a child." Jeff Levene, writer for The Escapist, wrote that "For as few resources as the Owl House team was given to wrap up the show, 'For the Future' is as perfect as it needs to be."
