= For the Future =

For the Future may refer to:

- For the Future (song), a 2005 song by Do As Infinity
- For the Future (political party), a political party in Ukraine
- "For the Future" (The Owl House), a 2023 television episode
