= Thanks to Them =

- The Owl House episode
- Promotional poster
- Episode no.: Season 3 Episode 1
- Directed by: Bosook Coburn; Amelia Lorenz
- Story by: Dana Terrace; Luz Batista; Emmy Cicierega; Mikki Crisostomo; Madeleine Hernandez; Zach Marcus; John Bailey Owen
- Teleplay by: Emmy Cicierega; Mikki Crisostomo; Madeleine Hernandez; Zach Marcus; John Bailey Owen
- Editing by: Dao Le
- Production code: 450H-301
- Original air dates: October 15, 2022 (Disney Channel & Disney XD)
- Running time: 46 minutes

Guest appearances
- Stephen Sandoval as Mr. Sandoval; Grey DeLisle as Masha; Roger Craig Smith as Jacob Hopkins; Anairis Quinones as Azura and Owl Tablet

Episode chronology
| ← Previous "King's Tide" | Next → "For the Future" |

"Thanks to Them" is the season three premiere of the American animated television series The Owl House, and the 41st overall episode of the series. The episode was written by show creator Dana Terrace, Luz Batista, and Emmy Cicierega, and directed by Bosook Coburn and Amelia Lorenz. It originally aired on October 15, 2022 on both Disney Channel and Disney XD, and was released on the former channel's official YouTube channel and Disney+ afterwards. The episode follows Luz and her friends living with Luz's mother, Camila for months as they attempt to return to the Demon Realm while also racing against Belos. However, Luz feeling depressed and Hunter having flashbacks of Belos get in their way.

The episode garnered a combined viewing audience of 349,000 viewers and received a 0.06 rating among adults between the ages of 18 and 49. It received praise from critics for its animation, writing, representation, use of time, and emotional themes.

== Plot ==
External videos
- The Owl House Season 3 Episode 1 Thanks to Them Full Episode @disneychannelanimation — Official upload of the episode onto YouTube

Following the events of "King's Tide", Luz Noceda and her mother, Camila, are reunited. Camila takes in Luz's friends, Amity, Willow, Gus, and Hunter. They spend the next couple of months trying to find a way back to the Demon Realm, during which the witches adjust to the human world, Vee adopting her own unique human form and Luz comes out to her mother as bisexual, introducing Amity as her girlfriend. Luz enters a state of depression, due to her guilt of indirectly helping Emperor Belos meet The Collector, thus setting all the trouble in the Boiling Isles into motion.

Near late October, while Luz is at school, her friends find a map in the abandoned house next to the Noceda residence that they believe could help them open the portal. The next day, Amity, Willow, Gus and Vee go off to explore the town and learn about the map, while Hunter stays behind because he suspects that Belos might have followed them from the Demon Realm. Upon arriving at the Gravesfield Historical Society, Masha, the curator, informs them that the map contains a rebus. After decoding it, they realize the map shows where Titan's Blood is being kept. Amity decides to surprise Luz with the discovery at the upcoming Halloween Festival as a way to celebrate their last days in the Human Realm.

Meanwhile, Hunter tells Luz his worries about Belos, so they search the abandoned house. After only finding a opossum there, they think they are safe, but Hunter is unknowingly possessed by Belos. That night, Luz records a video diary where she says that once everything is resolved, for everyone's sake, she will stay permanently in the Human Realm.

On Halloween, while Luz and her friends go to the Halloween Festival, Camila and Vee stay home to handle trick or treaters. While on a hayride, Masha tells the group of how centuries ago, Caleb Wittebane followed a witch named Evelyn to another realm with his younger brother Philip (Belos), chasing after him. Hunter has another vision of Belos and tells Luz about the surprise Amity had planned for her, suggesting they should find the Titan's Blood first to make sure the others won't get into trouble.

Meanwhile, Camila discovers Luz's video and leaves to find her, rallying Luz's friends to help out. Luz and Hunter use the map they took from Amity to lead them to a swamp in the town graveyard, where Luz discovers that her glyph magic is working again as they get closer to the Titan's Blood. With the discovery, Belos takes full control over Hunter's body, fighting Luz while gloating about her involvement in helping him, just as Amity, Willow, Gus, Camila, and Vee arrive. They all fight him, and when Belos tries to destroy Hunter's palisman, Flapjack, Hunter regains control over his body and throws the vial with the Titan's Blood into the water. Belos jumps after it, causing Hunter to almost drown, but Camila rescues him. Belos leaves Hunter's body, uses the Blood to open a portal to the Demon Realm, and escapes through it. Hunter nearly dies, so Flapjack sacrifices himself to revive him.

As everyone mourns Flapjack, Luz finally confesses to the others that she met Belos in the past and unknowingly helped in his plans to destroy the Boiling Isles. Before she can reveal her decision to stay in the Human Realm, Camila announces that she will join them in the Demon Realm to stop Belos and save the Isles. Luz's friends enter the portal while Vee stays behind. Assuring Luz that she is ready for what comes next, Camila takes her daughter's hand and they go through the portal together before it closes.

== Production ==
=== Development ===
According to show creator Dana Terrace, production for the final season was anticipated for a full 20-episode season. However, despite the popularity of the series, The Walt Disney Company would cut short the third season down into three 44-minute episodes. Terrace would not say that Disney had cut the show due to the show's LGBTQ+ content, despite the show being banned in several countries for that reason, saying in a Reddit AMA that "While we have had issues airing in a few countries (and are just straight up banned in a few more) I'm not gonna assume bad faith against the people I work with in LA." She would instead say that "At the end of the day, there are a few business people who oversee what fits into the Disney brand and one day one of those guys decided [The Owl House] didn't fit that 'brand'... The story is serialized (BARELY compared to any average anime lmao), our audience skews older, and that just didn't fit this one guy's tastes. That's it! Ain't that wild?" Terrace would also say that she would have no say about the show's cut in production.

Fan response to the cutting of the episodes was extremely negative, with many starting campaigns and petitions to try and get Disney to reverse the decision and air a full season. However, Terrace expressed that the decision "was set in stone" and that she could do nothing about it.

In a panel at the 2022 New York Comic Con, Terrace expressed disappointment at the show's cutting, but praised the production crew for trying despite the cutting, saying "What can you do at this point? We did our best."

=== Writing ===
The episode sees Hunter and Gus becoming fans of a Star Trek-esque franchise Camilla was a fan of in her younger years. The idea was conceived after Terrace began watching Star Trek: Deep Space Nine during the COVID-19 pandemic at the behest of the show's writing team, which brought her comfort during the pandemic, and inspired them to incorporate a similar franchise that brought the boys comfort during their time stranded on Earth.

=== Music ===
Starting with this episode, season 2 composer Brad Breeck worked alongside Andrew Smith on the show's score. Breeck released the score for "Thanks to Them" on his YouTube account as a one-hour video, with "chapters" dividing each individual track.

== Ratings ==
This episode was watched by 260,000 viewers on Disney Channel and a combined audience of 349,000 viewers including the simulcast on Disney XD.

=== Release ===
After the episode aired on Disney Channel, it was posted to the network's YouTube page and amassed over one million views within 24 hours.

== Promotion ==
On September 16, 2022, a promotional poster was released on show creator Dana Terrace's social media platforms, revealing the release date of the episode. According to writer Jade King, the poster had hinted on a significant time skip, potentially months after the last episode, "King's Tide," due to the change in appearance of several characters, including Luz's mom, Camila, having strands of grey hair and Hunter having a new haircut. This was later confirmed by King, who had looked into cable listings for the episode.

On October 6, 2022, the first six-minutes of the episode was previewed at the New York Comic Con panel. Later, two clips from the six-minute segment were released to the general public, with the first clip showcasing Luz Noceda's mother, Camila taking care of Hunter, Gus, Amity, Willow, and Vee as the aforementioned first four try to adapt to an unfamiliar human world. In the second clip, Luz laments over the previous events in the Demon Realm, believing that they were her fault, while Hunter tries to console her. He cautiously hushes Luz as she mentions that he is a Grimwalker, as the prospect of their friends discovering this makes him anxious. The two make a pact to keep these developments a secret until they feel ready to come clean.

== Critical reception ==
Lee Arvoy, writer for TV Source Magazine, called the episode "a great way to kick off the first of the three Season Three specials. It felt completely focused, yet full of many great moments." Patrick Gunn, writer for Collider, praised the episode for its depiction of grief. Heather Hogan, writer for Autostraddle, praised the episode's LGBTQ+ representation saying that it was "gayer than every other gay Disney and Marvel thing combined, and that was clearly very on purpose." Petrana Radulovic, writer for Polygon, praised the depiction of Camila Noceda. Jade King, writer for TheGamer, praised the episode's writing, use of its time, animation, LGBTQ+ representation, and character dynamics.
