= King's Tide =

- The Owl House episode
- Title card
- Episode no.: Season 2 Episode 21
- Directed by: Bridget Underwood
- Story by: Dana Terrace; Emmy Cicierega; Mikki Crisostomo; Madeleine Hernandez; Zach Marcus; John Bailey Owen
- Teleplay by: Zach Marcus; Dana Terrace
- Production code: 450H-221
- Original air date: May 28, 2022
- Running time: 22 minutes

Guest appearances
- Fryda Wolff as The Collector; Mela Lee as Kikimora; Jim Pirri as Alador Blight; Elizabeth Grullon as Camila Noceda; Keston John as Darius Deamonne; Debra Wilson as Terra Snapdragon; Noshir Dalal as Adrian Graye Vernworth

Episode chronology
← Previous "Clouds on the Horizon"	Next → "Thanks to Them"

"King's Tide" is the 21st episode and the season finale of the second season of the American animated television series The Owl House, and the 40th episode of the series overall. The episode was directed by Bridget Underwood, and the teleplay was written by Zach Marcus & Dana Terrace, from a story by Terrace, Emmy Cicierega, Mikki Crisostomo, Madeleine Hernandez, Marcus & John Bailey Owen.

The episode premiered on May 28, 2022 on Disney Channel and garnered 0.25 million viewers when it premiered. It received near-universal acclaim, with praise for its tone, emotional weight, suspense, animation, and cliffhanger.

== Plot ==
Aboard an airship, King has a dream in which he overhears Emperor Belos promising to free the Collector. Willow helps to deescalate an argument between Amity, Alador, Hunter, and Gus over Luz Noceda's capture, (Note: As depicted in the episode "Clouds on the Horizon".) teaching King a lesson: "There is always a way to help, and all you have to do is figure out how."

Belos gives a speech to the public, who remain unaware of his plan to eradicate witches and demons with a draining spell powered by an eclipse. Eda Clawthorne and the Covens Against the Throne attempt to disrupt the spell but are captured. The draining spell takes effect and starts to kill the assembled witches and demons. Belos teleports to his lair in the Skull as Kikimora delivers Luz, who is disguised as Hunter, to gain his favor. With only enough Titan's Blood for a one-way trip to the Human Realm, Belos betrays Kikimora and the Collector before confronting Luz, who attacks him.

The airship crew reach the Skull, but are shot down by Coven Guards and Abomatons. After the crash, Alador stays behind to fend off the Abomatons while the others go after Luz. Belos overpowers Luz, but she manipulates him into lowering his guard and brands him with a sigil, rendering him susceptible to the draining spell. Enraged, Belos transforms into a powerful lich-like monster and retaliates. Amity, Hunter, Gus, Willow, and King arrive and the former four join Luz in fighting Belos. Raine severs Eda's sigil arm to save her from the draining spell, keeping their earlier promise to Luz.

King learns from Kikimora that only the Collector has the power to stop the draining spell. King finds the Collector and convinces him to stop the spell by promising to play a game called "Owl House" with him. Once freed, the Collector obliterates Belos, saving Luz and her friends. The Collector begins reshaping the world, believing they need an "Owl House" to play "Owl House", and kidnaps King. Amity, Willow, Gus, and Hunter flee through Belos' portal, although a fragment of his remains falls onto Hunter's shoulder.

With Luz unwilling to leave him or Eda behind, King sacrifices himself by forcing her and the others through the closing portal. Luz and her friends are stranded in the Human Realm where Luz reunites with her mother, Camila. In a post-credits scene, the remains of Belos that followed Hunter comes to life.

== Critical reception ==
Lee Arvoy, writer for TV Source Magazine, wrote a positive review for the episode, citing that the episode was a great season finale and an emotional episode. Along with this, Arvoy praised the cliffhanger brought upon the remaining inhabitants of the Boiling Isles, the exploration of Hunter and Luz's trauma sustained from the Day of Unity, and an overall feeling of nervousness and anxiousness about the future of the series' characters.

Jade King, writer for pop culture website TheGamer, also reviewed the episode positively, connecting the series itself to fellow Disney Channel show Amphibia, saying that "King's Tide" was similar to the season two finale of Amphibia, "True Colors". King wrote that the episode pushed the medium for children's television, saying that the episode had "daring story developments, bold character moments, and subject matter that is way heavier than expected for the demographic... [it delivered] a finale that surpassed all expectations." King also praised the cliffhanger at the end of the episode, writing that she personally wanted Luz and her friends to have fun in the Human Realm after Luz suffered mental trauma during the events of the Day of Unity.
