= True Colors (Amphibia) =

- Amphibia episode
- Title card
- Episode no.: Season 2 Episode 20
- Directed by: Kyler Spears; Jenn Strickland
- Written by: Michele Cavin; Jenava Mie
- Original air date: May 22, 2021
- Running time: 24 minutes

Guest appearances
- Full list: Haley Tju as Marcy Wu; Anna Akana as Sasha Waybright; Troy Baker as Captain Grime; Keith David as King Andrias; Michelle Dockery as Lady Olivia; Zehra Fazal as General Yunan

Episode chronology
← Previous "Battle of the Bands"	Next → "The New Normal"
- Amphibia season 2

"True Colors" is the twentieth and final episode of the second season of the American animated television series Amphibia, and the 40th episode overall. The episode was written by Michele Cavin and Jenava Mie and directed by Kyler Spears and Jenn Strickland, and originally aired on Disney Channel on May 22, 2021. It garnered 0.33 million viewers when it premiered.

The episode revolves around Anne and her friends arriving at Newtopia in their quest to return home, leading to a set of fateful discoveries and betrayals as they discover that someone else has set other plans for her and her friends in motion.

The episode received universal acclaim for its fluid animation, voice acting, character development, mature themes, emotional depth, action sequences, cinematography, musical score, scale, writing and cliffhanger. Many fans and critics have called it one of the best episodes, if not the best episode, of the series.

== Plot ==
On the day of Anne's thirteenth birthday, Marcy reads about the Calamity Box's ability to transport to other worlds when she receives a text from her parents, who demand her to come home immediately to discuss an important matter. Marcy is left upset by the matter, running out of her house in tears; she comes across the Calamity Box at a thrift store, and texts Sasha, saying she has found the perfect birthday gift for Anne.

In the present day, Anne, Sasha, Marcy, the Plantars, Grime, and Frobo return to Newtopia to give the Calamity Box to King Andrias. Anne reassures a saddened Sprig that with the box's powers, they could still see each other, while Polly begins to feel itchy. Inside the castle, Sasha and Grime steal the box and make Andrias surrender, with the intention to incite a toad rebellion in Newtopia. Betrayed once again, an enraged Anne confronts Sasha and decides she is done being friends with her. Sasha promptly attempts to use the box's powers to send the girls home, only for it to not work. She orders them and Lady Olivia imprisoned.

Anne, Marcy, the Plantars, and Frobo are saved by General Yunan. Taking shelter in an old restaurant, Anne rallies everyone to fight back against the toad rebellion and comes up with a plan; Marcy, Hop Pop, and Lady Olivia will save King Andrias while Polly, Frobo, and General Yunan fight the toad soldiers. Meanwhile, Anne and Sprig will close the gates before the toad army arrives. Back at the throne room, Sasha, feeling guilty she betrayed Anne again, contemplates if she is a horrible person. Grime helps her remove a tapestry of a benevolent Andrias, only to find a mural of a sinister-looking Andrias using the Calamity Box to cause chaos and destruction across other realms. Realizing that Andrias is not what he seems, and after seeing Anne and Sprig trying to close the gates, they rush out to stop them.

The toad army arrives in Newtopia, while Sprig battles Grime. Sasha tries to warn Anne about Andrias, but Anne, still furious with Sasha, refuses to listen and begins to fight. Eventually, Anne and Sprig defeat Sasha and Grime and manage to close the gates. Andrias then appears and orders his guard to arrest the toad soldiers, stopping the rebellion.

With Sasha and Grime tied up, Anne, Sprig, Polly, Frobo, and Yunan return to the throne room to wait for Andrias, who arrives with Marcy, Hop Pop, and Olivia. Anne, ignoring Sasha's warnings, gives the box to Andrias, who proceeds to tell everyone that he has been waiting for the box to return to his possession with the intention to conquer other worlds. He puts the box on a pedestal, which causes his castle to rise into the sky and deploys an army of robots, destroys one of the Toad Towers, and reveals that, much to Marcy's horror, he has been lying to her; he then tells Anne and Sasha that Marcy indeed had full knowledge of the box's powers and got them all stuck in Amphibia on purpose. The truth exposed, Marcy confesses that on the day they left, her parents told her they would be moving away; not wanting to be split from her friends, she decided to use the box to keep them all together in Amphibia.

Acknowledging the mistakes everyone has made, Anne, freeing Sasha and Grime and joining the Plantars, Yunan, Olivia, and Marcy, declares that Andrias must be stopped. During the fight, Frobo is destroyed, Polly grows legs, and Andrias drops Sprig out the window; he is saved by Marcy, riding on Joe Sparrow. Overwhelmed with sorrow and rage, Anne taps into her calamity box powers as she is still connected to one of its stones and single-handedly fights Andrias and all his robots, which exhausts her to the point she has fainted. Having witnessed Anne's power, Andrias decides he must not let her live. Taking the Calamity Box, Marcy uses it to open a portal back to Earth, allowing Anne and the Plantars to escape with Frobo's remains. However, Andrias impales Marcy through her chest. She lets out one last apology before she collapses, dropping the box and closing the portal.

Anne and the Plantars awaken on the hood of a car in the middle of Los Angeles traffic. When the Plantars ask where they are, Anne solemnly comments that she is finally home.

== Production and broadcasting ==
The episode was originally scheduled to premiere on May 1, 2021, but it was pulled the day before it aired and replaced with a rerun. Although early reports attributed the delay to a scheduling shift, it was later revealed that the episode was pulled by the network at the last minute due to concerns over the violent nature of the final scene. As a compromise to air the scene fully uncensored, a disclaimer warning was added in at the beginning of the episode, as well as a post-credits scene which featured the opening sequence for the third and final season of the series, revealing Marcy's actual fate.

The episode was accidentally released on iTunes the day after the episode was originally scheduled to premiere, but it was quickly taken down. However, the episode was soon taken and placed on several streaming sites. As a result of that, the creator of the show, Matt Braly, started putting up videos of Amphibia characters telling the viewers not to watch the episode too early. Some of these characters included Grime, Maddie, Loggle, Yunan, Felicia, Hop Pop, and Curator Ponds. On the iTunes version of the episode, some fans spotted an error where a green newt with a hat was seen with the characters at the climax of the episode. When the error was reported the creators fixed it by replacing the newt with Lady Olivia when the episode officially premiered.

== Reception ==
Since airing, "True Colors" has received universal acclaim. Many call it one of the best episodes of the entire series.

Patrick Gunn from Collider praises the episode for its great character development and describes Andrias as the true star of the episode. Gunn even states that the episode "plays with the bonds both broken and torn throughout the series to create a thrilling triumph. The stakes are higher because they mesh with the themes of friendship throughout the series and builds and expands upon them. Not to mention the amazing animation and fight choreography, particularly during the blue powers fight." Hope Mullex from The Geeky Waffle said the episode was "Gut Punching", Mullex also describes the show itself as a "Fastasticially Written Drama" due to the concept of flawed female characters having their own personal journey in the world of Amphibia.

It was also referenced on the pop culture website TheGamer where it was stated that "King's Tide", the season finale for Season 2 of The Owl House, had a similar ending to this episode. Both shows were even described to being "Kindred Spirits."
