= The Owl House =

American animated television series

- Genre: Fantasy; Horror comedy
- Created by: Dana Terrace
- Showrunner: Dana Terrace
- Voices of: Sarah-Nicole Robles; Wendie Malick; Alex Hirsch; Tati Gabrielle; Issac Ryan Brown; Mae Whitman; Cissy Jones; Zeno Robinson; Matthew Rhys; Michaela Dietz; Elizabeth Grullon; Fryda Wolff
- Theme music composer: T.J. Hill
- Opening theme: "The Owl House Main Theme"
- Composers: T.J. Hill (season 1); Brad Breeck (seasons 2–3); Andrew Morgan Smith (season 3)
- Country of origin: United States
- Original language: English
- No. of seasons: 3
- No. of episodes: 43 (list of episodes)

Production
- Executive producer: Dana Terrace
- Producer: Wade Wisinski
- Editors: Kevin Locarro (seasons 1–2); Dao Le (season 3)
- Running time: 22 minutes (seasons 1–2); 46–55 minutes (season 3)
- Production company: Disney Television Animation

Original release
- Network: Disney Channel
- Release: January 10, 2020 – April 8, 2023

The Owl House is an American animated fantasy television series created by Dana Terrace that aired on Disney Channel from January 10, 2020, to April 8, 2023. The series features the voices of Sarah-Nicole Robles, Wendie Malick, Alex Hirsch, Tati Gabrielle, Issac Ryan Brown, Mae Whitman, Cissy Jones, Zeno Robinson, Matthew Rhys, Michaela Dietz, Elizabeth Grullon, and Fryda Wolff. The series follows Luz Noceda (Robles), a teenage girl who learns magic after being transported to a fantasy world and befriending a witch named Eda Clawthorne (Malick) and her demon housemate King (Hirsch).

In November 2019, ahead of the series premiere, the series was renewed for a second season, which premiered on June 12, 2021. In May 2021, ahead of the second-season premiere, the series was renewed for a third season consisting of three specials, later announced to be the final season of the series. Terrace later stated the show had been shortened, because the series "did not fit the Disney brand". The first episode of the final season premiered on October 15, 2022, followed by the second episode on January 21, 2023, and the series finale on April 8, 2023.

The Owl House has received widespread acclaim from critics and viewers alike, with praise for its animation, humor, characters, voice acting, themes, emotional weight, and emphasizing LGBTQ representation more than other Disney media, including becoming the first Disney property to feature a same-sex couple in leading roles, a same-sex kiss involving lead characters, same-sex parents, and non-binary characters. The series won an award for Children's & Youth Programming at the 2021 Peabody Awards.

== Premise ==
The series centers on Luz Noceda, a 14-year-old Dominican-American human girl who accidentally stumbles upon a portal to the Demon Realm. She arrives at the Boiling Isles, an archipelago formed from the remains of a dead titan, and befriends the rebellious witch Eda Clawthorne, also known as "The Owl Lady", and her adorable demon housemate King. Despite not having magical abilities, Luz pursues her dream of becoming a witch by serving as Eda's apprentice at the Owl House and ultimately finds a new family in an unlikely setting.

In the second season, Luz attempts to return to the Human Realm, Eda tries to confront her curse, and King searches for the truth about his past while contending with the Boiling Isles' ruler, Emperor Belos, who is preparing for the mysterious "Day of Unity".

In the third and final season (labeled as specials), Luz and her friends set out to save the Boiling Isles from the evil Belos and the unpredictable Collector.

== Episodes ==
| Season | Episodes | Originally released | |
| Season | Episodes | First released | Last released |
|---|---|---|---|
| 1 | 19 | January 10, 2020 | August 29, 2020 |
| 2 | 21 | June 12, 2021 | May 28, 2022 |
| 3 | 3 | October 15, 2022 | April 8, 2023 |

== Cast ==
- Sarah-Nicole Robles as Luz Noceda
- Wendie Malick as Edalyn "Eda" Clawthorne
- Alex Hirsch as King Clawthorne and Hooty
- Mae Whitman as Amity Blight
- Tati Gabrielle as Willow Park
- Issac Ryan Brown as Gus Porter
- Zeno Robinson as Hunter
- Matthew Rhys as Emperor Belos
- Cissy Jones as Lilith Clawthorne
- Michaela Dietz as Vee
- Elizabeth Grullon as Camila Noceda
- Fryda Wolff as The Collector

== Production ==
=== Background ===
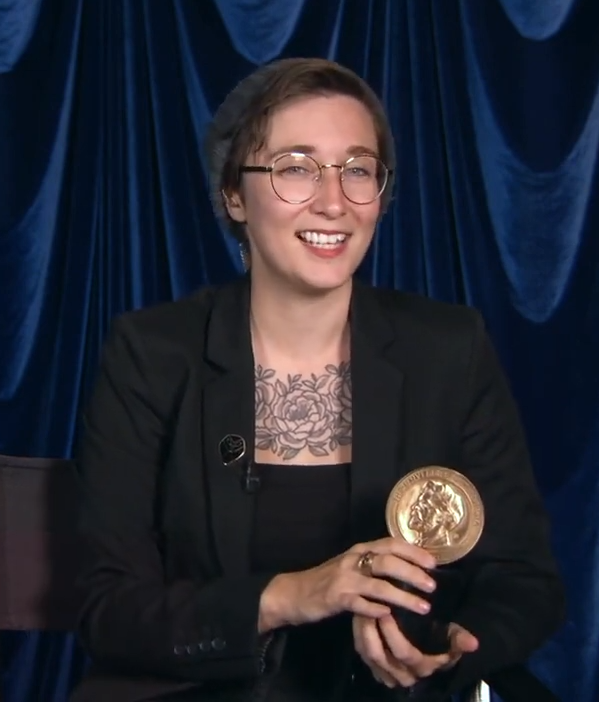
Series creator Dana Terrace in 2021

Dana Terrace began conceiving early ideas for a series about a girl learning to be a witch in late 2016. While working on DuckTales, Terrace did not feel "fulfilled artistically or emotionally", so she began to research influences and work from her college years, eventually rediscovering the works of artists such as Hieronymus Bosch and Remedios Varo, inspiring her to create a show for Disney that featured strong surreal visual elements. Terrace initially pitched the idea to both Nickelodeon and Cartoon Network, but neither deal went through.

In 2018, it was reported that Terrace, previously a storyboard artist for Gravity Falls and later a director of the 2017 DuckTales reboot, was creating and executive-producing an animated series, titled The Owl House, for Disney Television Animation. The series was greenlit alongside Amphibia in 2018 with an order of 19 episodes, and was set originally for a 2019 release, but delayed to 2020. Terrace would later call the decision to work with Disney as a fortuitous one stating, "I think it's important to note that Owl House would NOT be what it is if made at another studio", and cited the fact that having each episode run for 22 minutes rather than 11 is one of the reasons why it worked out so well.

Terrace is the fourth woman to create a series for Disney Television Animation, after Sue Rose (Pepper Ann), Chris Nee (Doc McStuffins), and Daron Nefcy (Star vs. the Forces of Evil).

=== Development ===
Terrace said that the general lore for the series was inspired by art and storybooks by Hieronymus Bosch. According to Terrace, the hardest decision when creating the series was whether to implement potential lore elements in the series. Terrace also stated the lore of the series is "70 percent made up", with writers also drawing inspiration from books about witchcraft for spells and character names, to add depth to its lore. The Pokémon franchise served as a strong influence on the series.

Eda was the earliest character created for the show. Terrace said the character was inspired by "the women who raised me. My aunts, my Nana, and my mom, they're all in the Owl Lady." The second character created was King, who was described by Terrace as "a little guy that wants to be big", something she related to. Luz was the final main character created and was inspired by her roommate, consultant, and story artist Luz Batista. Batista agreed to let Terrace use her name for the series' main character on the condition that she be Dominican-American, which Terrace agreed to. The character's personality was inspired by "stories of each other about what dorks we were in high school", as well as parts from Terrace's childhood. Alex Hirsch, creator of Gravity Falls and then-partner of Dana Terrace, was a creative consultant on the series, where Terrace previously worked as a storyboard artist.

Several of the series' themes are inspired by Terrace's childhood. The series explores uniqueness and conformity, themes drawn from Terrace's own school years. After being mocked for drawing roadkill, she eventually found a community of like-minded peers at a new school. The series also explores the idea of getting close to fulfilling a dream, yet being unable to completely fulfill it, inspired by how Terrace was told that she wouldn't be a cartoonist, only to "[find her] own path". Hirsch said that while there was a concern with Disney Channel over the series' horror elements, Terrace nevertheless chose to incorporate them, arguing that "Disney is the full spectrum of emotions, creatures and scary things". Terrace said that Disney "allowed me to do more than I thought they would". Terrace also said that the producers "[don't] want to pull [their] punches on the show" in its horror elements, as she "loved being a little scared" as a child, though she also wanted to balance them with comedy and heartfelt moments. She described the magic elements on the show as "a framing device for the grounded emotional stories" featured in the series.

The series initially had a darker tone, as Terrace wanted to create a TV series targeted at older audiences "where things like whimsy and darkness can coexist", but had to tone it down during the first season to find a compromise between her ideas and Disney executives' wishes. She nevertheless was proud of the final product. The tone of the second season was closer to what Terrace originally intended. Following the series finale, Terrace stated that she has not ruled out the possibility of a continuation at some point in the future.

=== Animation ===
The show was animated by Rough Draft Korea, Sunmin Image Pictures, and Sugarcube Animation. Terrace said that the visual style was inspired by paintings by Remedios Varo, John Bauer, and Hieronymus Bosch, as well as Russian architecture. By December 2019, the show had 120 people working on it, including those in the animation studios, and 50 staffers on the pre-production crew. Spencer Wan served as the animation supervisor during season one. Disney initially refused for the series to have an in-house animator, feeling Wan may have not met their "overseas pipeline", but he was eventually hired. Kofi Fiagome serves as animation supervisor for season two. Terrace also provided rough animation for three season two episodes.

Ricky Cometa served as the art director for the series. Cometa first became involved with the series when Terrace began working on the pilot, before the series was green-lit by Disney, and was approached by Terrace, a fan and friend of Cometa's because she "really wanted to work with someone who I vibed with, someone whose style I knew, that could execute the kind of weird junk I wanted to do", and Cometa agreed to work on the series due to being interested in the concept. Cometa said that he wanted to "try and show the dualities between the Demon Realm and the human realm, and with a little twist of demons and eyeballs and bones and whatnot". He also wanted some demons on the show to have non-frightening appearances, as they were supposed to represent normal people within the show. Terrace said that Luz's design was "challenging", as she struggled to create a design for Luz that didn't make her look too old or that felt too much like a costume. Cometa eventually created a t-shirt for Luz to wear that was "low key, and like a nod to all our fellow nerds out there". Cometa said that it was "fun" to design demonic versions of common locations. The animators also changed real-life elements to further distinguish the Boiling Isles from Earth, such as making the ocean purple.

On July 19, 2019, Terrace announced that TJ Hill had composed the series' score. On January 10, 2020, Hill said that the score featured "interesting and experimental sounds that [he] had a ton of fun cooking up". In the second season, Gravity Falls and Star vs. the Forces of Evil composer Brad Breeck took over as composer. By March 2020, Disney Television Animation was closed in response to the COVID-19 pandemic, forcing the production crew to work on season two remotely from their homes.

== Broadcast ==
On June 10, 2019, the first trailer for the series premiered during the show's Annecy 2019 panel. It was uploaded to Disney Channel's YouTube channel a day later. The show's main title sequence was released on July 19, 2019, during the San Diego Comic-Con. A sneak peek and an official end credit sequence were released on October 4, 2019, during a panel at the New York Comic Con. The show's main title sequence for season two was released on May 17, 2021. A trailer for season two was released on June 3, 2021. On November 21, 2019, the series was renewed for a 21-episode second season prior to the first season's debut. Season one aired its 19th and final episode on August 29, 2020. On May 17, 2021, the series was renewed for a third season, which would consist of three 44-minute specials, ahead of the second season premiere. The episode order was much shorter than the 10–20 episodes that the production team was anticipating, only for Terrace to later confirm in a response to a fan's question that it would be the final season.

In October 2021, in an AMA on Reddit, Terrace explained the series was cut short not because of its ratings or the COVID-19 pandemic, but rather because executives at The Walt Disney Company believed that it did not fit "into the Disney brand". She stated that this was the case due to the serialized nature of the show and an audience that "skews older", rather than due to its LGBTQ+ representation, saying that she would not "assume bad faith" against the studio executives. Terrace also noted that due to the pandemic, budgets were constrained and episodes were cut, further adding that she was not allowed to present a case for a fourth season. However, Terrace said that she believed there was a future for the show if Disney Branded Television had "different people in charge". When asked about the series' future on Twitter, Terrace expressed interest in continuing it in other media. This content could include comics and a limited series centering on Eda's past, as well as other potential spin-offs, though Terrace stated the three specials of season 3 were the end of the main story, persuading fans to ask Disney regarding more content based on the show. On March 10, 2023, Terrace confirmed that production on the series had been completed.

The Owl House had its first international debut in Canada on January 12, 2020, in Southeast Asia on March 20, 2020, in Turkey on April 6, 2020, in Latin America on April 13, 2020, in France on April 15, 2020, in South Korea on May 23, 2020, in Japan on July 23, 2020, in the United Kingdom and Ireland on August 10, 2020, in the Netherlands on August 24, 2020, in Spain on October 3, 2020, in Africa on October 26, 2020, in Romania and Bulgaria on January 2, 2021, in Poland on Disney XD on January 4, 2021, in Portugal on January 11, 2021, and in Scandinavia on February 15, 2021.

The entire first season was added to Disney+ in the United States on October 30, 2020. In the U.S., the first five episodes of the second season were added to Disney+ on July 21, 2021, while episodes six through ten were added on August 18. It was originally intended to premiere on January 2, 2021, on the local Disney Channel feed shared by Hungary and the Czech Republic, but it has not aired on the channel. The series later premiered exclusively on Disney+ in those two countries on June 14, 2022.

== Themes ==
Prominent themes explored in The Owl House include disability, neurodiversity, queer identity, and colonialism. Viewers of the show have engaged with its portrayal of a wide variety of disabling conditions, from chronic illness in the case of Eda Clawthorne, to "overtly" neurodivergent characters such as Luz Noceda. It has also received praise for its subversion of various disability story tropes such as "miracle cures" and "overcoming" your disability. The themes often work in relation to each other, where commentators have highlighted the interconnected history of colonialism and anti-queer normativity, where through having textual representation of queer characters working against colonial powers The Owl House both within its story, as well as the work in itself, works in countering colonialist thought.

The rule of Emperor Belos alongside being analyzed as a system of colonial oppression, has also been analyzed as a system of fascism. Where many of the visual cues that are used to show the system of Belos' rule match those of other fictional stories that seek to emulate the aesthetic of fascism for their oppressive governments. Agnieszka Urbańczyk argues that in the case of The Owl House it is not just a surface level association as is common in fictional media, but that the show presents a nuanced depiction of how fascism acts and controls citizens in their everyday life.

=== LGBTQ+ representation ===
The Owl House has been praised for featuring several LGBTQ+ characters, particularly the romance between Luz Noceda and Amity Blight. Series creator Dana Terrace first implied a romance between the two on July 7, 2020, when responding to a fan who posted a screenshot from the upcoming episode "Enchanting Grom Fright" on Twitter, which showed Amity putting her hands on Luz's shoulders and looking into her eyes. Claiming "there is no heterosexual explanation" for Amity's action, Terrace responded, "there really isn't". On August 8, 2020, the episode, written by Lee Knox Ostertag, aired, and it featured a scene in which Luz and Amity dance together while casting spells to defeat "Grom", a demon that manifests as their deepest fears. The animation supervisor for the show, Spencer Wan, referred to their intimate dance as "the gay thing" and the first time he got to "do anything even remotely queer".

On September 2, 2020, during a Reddit AMA, Dana Terrace confirmed that Amity is intended to be a lesbian and that Luz is bisexual. The two girls represent Disney's second animated LGBTQ+ characters after Sheriff Blubs and Deputy Durland in Gravity Falls, and the first to be unambiguously portrayed as such. In the episode "Understanding Willow", one of the main characters, Willow Park, is shown to have two dads. Some noted that the beginning of the show's second season, which began airing in 2021, continued to build out the relationship between Amity and Luz, with Luz reciprocating Amity's feelings at the end of "Escaping Expulsion" and both blushing at each other. Others praised Amity's character evolving outside her "relationship with Luz".

The series was nominated for a GLAAD Media Award for Outstanding Kids and Family Programming in 2021 and won a Peabody Award for "...giving queer kids a welcome template...to explore their own budding creative energies."

The episode "Through the Looking Glass Ruins" received significant attention over Luz and Amity's growing relationship and its ending, in which Amity kisses Luz on the cheek. The episode "Eda's Requiem" introduces a character named Raine Whispers, who is referred to with singular they pronouns. Raine is voiced by transgender and non-binary actor Avi Roque. Raine is Disney TVA's first transgender and/or non-binary character. Roque said that the character is based on their own experience, with the character's skin color reflecting their actual skin color, and praised the show for normalizing queer identity, and said it was an honor to voice Raine. In the episode, Eda Clawthorne is shown to have romantic feelings for Raine. The subsequent episode, "Knock, Knock, Knockin' on Hooty's Door", reveals that Eda and Raine were formerly dating, before breaking up due to Raine beginning work in the coven system. The episode also includes a scene of Luz and Amity asking each other out and officially becoming a couple. GLAAD praised the episode, saying they were excited to see a "wonderful and affirming message" from the series. Jade King of TheGamer praised the series for having a fictional universe where queer characters can "learn to love themselves without the fear of ridicule", comparing it to the similar approaches in Steven Universe and She-Ra and the Princesses of Power, noting the relationship between Luz and Amity.

In March 2022, Lilith, Eda's older sister, was revealed to be aromantic and asexual during a charity Livestream, via an in-character letter read by the character's voice actress Cissy Jones. Jade King of TheGamer noted that Cissy Jones said that her letter during a charity stream saying that Lilith didn't have any romantic attractions was "basically canon".

On May 21, 2022, the penultimate episode of season two, "Clouds on the Horizon" aired, in which Luz and Amity share a kiss on the lips.

A promotional video released on September 25, 2022, depicted Luz in a new outfit with a pin on her beanie, picturing the bisexual flag. On October 15, 2022, the first The Owl House special "Thanks to Them" has Luz coming out to her mother as bisexual. The special also reveals that Vee's campmate Masha is non-binary: at the character's workplace, their desk has a name plate that reads "MASHA (they/them)", and their nails are painted the colors of the non-binary pride flag. On April 8, 2023, the series finale "Watching and Dreaming" revealed King's father "Papa Titan" to be genderqueer, as he refers to himself as "both king and queen".

After the series' finale, Dana Terrace clarified two of Luz's friends, Willow and Hunter, as being pansexual and bisexual respectively.

== Reception ==
=== Critical reception ===
The Owl House received critical acclaim. review aggregator website Rotten Tomatoes reported a 100% approval rating with an average rating of 7.6/10, based on 13 critic reviews. However, the show's third season has an unconfirmed Tomatometer approval rating. Emily Ashby of Common Sense Media rated the show 4 out of 5 stars and said putting different elements together made the series quirky and likeable. It was also described as well-written and animated, and speculated that "[the show] likely will be one you will want to watch alongside your older kids and tweens, allowing you to discuss these kinds of themes as they come up." LaughingPlace.com's critic praised the series for its unique visuals and voice acting, stating "The performances fit together beautifully as the diversity in their delivery showcases the characters' unique roles in the Demon Realm." Collider's Dave Trumbore gave the series' first episode a 4-star rating, feeling that the episode "[has] got a dark, yet darkly comic edge to the whole thing". The conservative evangelical Christian religious television network Christian Broadcasting Network attacked the show, declaring it was part of a "witch agenda to make witchcraft look positive", an assessment that a writer for The Mary Sue called "hyperbolic", and stated that a "rebellious Latina witch" is, to those like CBN, "probably the scariest thing", while stating that the show sounds like "a ton of fun".

Kevin Johnson of The A.V. Club was critical of the series, stating that they were not "buying the developments between Amity and Luz", but praised Eda's character. Ben Bertoli wrote that Terrace and those working on the show had done a great job creating a fantasy world and relatable characters, and predicted a "big animation fandom". Nick Venable wrote that fans of Gravity Falls and Steven Universe would love the series because the "otherworld-ness of the Boiling Isle[s] immediately asserts itself" while the show makes "relationships feel genuine and tactile", following in the footsteps of those shows. At the same time, Colin Hickson of Comic Book Resources praised the series, while noting that the opening of the series would give "any Gravity Falls fans a major sense of deja vu". Jade King of TheGamer described the show as a "groundbreaking queer adventure" that has broken boundaries in LGBTQ+ representation, noting how it builds off of She-Ra and the Princesses of Power and Steven Universe. King also said that the show could make sure "queer content isn't merely a footnote to the overall story" but ingrained into the show itself. In another review, King compared the series to Matt Braly's Amphibia, another Disney Channel animated series, noting their similar premise and characters, calling them "kindred spirits".

=== Ratings ===
The Owl House was watched by approximately 375,000 viewers in the United States as of April 8, 2023, corresponding to a 0.12% rating in the P2+ demographic, up from 295,000 viewers (0.09%) on January 21, 2023. Historical daily ratings on Disney Channel have ranged from roughly 221,000 to 348,000 viewers in the P2+ category, with ratings between 0.07 and 0.11. Among adults aged 18–49, viewership has varied from approximately 65,200 to 143,500, with ratings between 0.05 and 0.11, while the P25–54 demographic has recorded audiences of 85,100 to 146,000.

Whip Media, which tracks viewership data for over 1 million daily users worldwide through its TV Time app, calculated that The Owl House was the eighth top-rising show across in the U.S. based on the highest week-over-week growth in episodes watched during the week of June 13, 2021. JustWatch, a guide to streaming content with access to data from more than 20 million users around the world, estimated that it was the sixth most-streamed series in the U.S. from October 10–16, 2022. Market research company Parrot Analytics, which looks at consumer engagement in consumer research, streaming, downloads, and on social media, reported that The Owl House was one of the most in-demand shows on Disney+ in December 2022. The series had 31.5 times the average demand for a television series, ranking third on the platform behind The Simpsons and The Mandalorian.

=== Accolades ===
| Year | Award | Category | Nominee(s) | Result | Ref. |
|---|---|---|---|---|---|
| 2020 | Autostraddle TV Awards | Outstanding Animated Series | The Owl House | Nominated | |
| 2021 | GLAAD Media Award | Outstanding Kids and Family Programming | The Owl House | Nominated | |
| 2021 | Annie Awards | Best Character Design | Marina Gardner (for "Young Blood, Old Souls") | Nominated | |
| 2021 | Peabody Awards | Children's & Youth Programming | The Owl House (Shared with Stillwater) | Won | |
| 2021 | Daytime Emmys | Outstanding Main Title for a Daytime Animated Program | The Owl House | Nominated | |
| 2021 | Imagen Awards | Best Voice-Over Actor – Television | Sarah-Nicole Robles | Nominated | |
| 2021 | Autostraddle TV Awards | Outstanding Animated Series | The Owl House | Nominated | |
| 2022 | GLAAD Media Award | Outstanding Kids and Family Programming | The Owl House | Nominated | |
| 2022 | BMI Film & TV Awards | BMI Cable Television Awards | TJ Hill | Won | |
| 2022 | Autostraddle TV Awards | Outstanding LGBTQ+ Director / Writer / Showrunner | Dana Terrace | Nominated | |
| 2022 | Autostraddle TV Awards | Outstanding Animated Series | The Owl House | Won | |
| 2022 | Imagen Awards | Best Voice-Over Actor (Television) | Sarah-Nicole Robles | Nominated | |
| 2022 | Imagen Awards | Best Youth Programming | The Owl House | Nominated | |
| 2023 | Annie Awards | Best TV/Media – Children | "King's Tide" | Nominated | |
| 2023 | GLAAD Media Award | Outstanding Kids and Family Programming - Animated | The Owl House | Nominated | |
| 2024 | Autostraddle TV Awards | Outstanding Animated Series | The Owl House | Nominated | |

== In other media ==
- In 2020, a video game titled The Owl House: Witch's Apprentice was released for iOS and Windows. Players take on the role of Luz Noceda.
- In 2021, Disney Publishing Worldwide released a picture book titled The Owl House: Witches Before Wizards, inspired by the episode of the same name. A second book, The Owl House: Hex-cellent Tales from the Boiling Isles, was released later, drawing on the episodes "I Was a Teenage Abomination" and "Adventures in the Elements."
- A light novel based on The Owl House was scheduled for release in May 2022. Creator Dana Terrace stated that the novel was to feature an original story based on the in-universe fictional series The Good Witch Azura. However, Terrace confirmed on March 25, 2022, in a now-deleted tweet, that the light novel had been cancelled due to financial disputes between the publisher and the authors hired to write it.
- On February 12, 2026, Terrace announced that she and Mikki Crisostomo were writing a graphic novel called The Owl House: The Long-Lived King, with illustrations by Daun Han. It was released on September 29, 2026. On October 9, 2026, it became a New York Times bestseller.

== Future ==
On April 15, 2023, while addressing the possibility of a continuation, Dana Terrace stated she would be focusing on new personal projects, but did not write off the possibility of eventually continuing the series. In November 2024, she further explained that she did not want to "make [her] entire career revolve around one show idea", later reiterating this statement in January 2025.

On February 12, 2026, Dana announced a new graphic novel titled The Owl House: The Long-Lived King for a September 29, 2026 release and confirmed that it would take place 2 years after the main events of the series finale. She also expressed hope that the book's success could lead to further stories being made as graphic novels since she had lots of ideas for them.

== Works cited ==
- Gunderson, Alexis (October 12, 2022). "The Owl House: A Witchin' Primer". Paste. Archived from the original on August 4, 2025.
- O'Brien, Katelyn (2024). Queer Kids are Not Alone: Searching for 2S-LGBTQIA+ Representation in Children's Animated Television (MA). Toronto Metropolitan University. doi:10.32920/25164542.v1.
- Salja, Emily (2022). "Landscapes of possibility: An introduction to fantasy in 2SLGBTQIA+ and disabled therapeutic contexts" (PDF). International Journal of Narrative Therapy and Community Work. 2022 (1): 17–25. Archived from the original (PDF) on March 1, 2024.
- Urbańczyk, Agnieszka (2023). ""Prawdziwym cesarzem cały czas było społeczeństwo". Sowi dom i jego wizja faszyzmu" ["The real emperor was society all along." The Owl House and its vision of fascism]. Annales Universitatis Paedagogicae Cracoviensis. Studia de Cultura (in Polish). 15 (3): 131–138. doi:10.24917/20837275.15.3.9. ISSN 2083-7275.
