= Watching and Dreaming =

- The Owl House episode
- The official promotional poster for the episode, made by Dana Terrace and Andy Garner–Flexner.
- Episode no.: Season 3 Episode 3
- Directed by: Bosook Coburn; Bridget Underwood
- Story by: Dana Terrace
- Teleplay by: Dana Terrace; John Bailey Owen
- Production code: 450H-303
- Original air dates: April 8, 2023 (Disney Channel & Disney XD)
- Running time: 55 minutes

Guest appearances
- Peter Gallagher as Dell Clawthorne; Arin Hanson as Papa Titan; Jorge Diaz as Matt Tholomule; Chris Houghton as Bill; Dana Terrace as Tinella Nosa

Episode chronology
← Previous "For the Future"	Next → —

"Watching and Dreaming" is the series finale of the American animated television series The Owl House. The episode served as the third and final episode of the third season, and the 43rd episode of the series overall. In the episode, Luz, after reuniting with Eda and King, manages to befriend the Collector and stop Belos from destroying the Boiling Isles.

The episode was written by show creator Dana Terrace and John Bailey Owen, and directed by Bosook Coburn and Bridget Underwood. It originally aired on April 8, 2023, on both Disney Channel and Disney XD, and was released on the former's official YouTube channel and Disney+ afterwards.

The episode received a combined viewing audience of 500,000 viewers and received a 0.09 rating among adults between the ages of 18 and 49. It received praise from critics for its writing, themes, action sequences, pacing, animation, musical score, ending sequence, and emotional weight, with many calling it a satisfying conclusion to the show, although some expressed disappointment over the cut storylines and arcs for certain characters in order to fit in with the shortened season.

== Plot ==
External videos
- The Owl House Season 3 Final Episode Watching and Dreaming Full Episode @disneychannelanimation — Official upload of the episode onto YouTube

Continuing from the events of "For the Future", Luz Noceda, her mother, Camila, and their friends are captured by the Collector. Luz, Eda Clawthorne, and King wake into illusory nightmares, which are puppeteered by the Collector's magic. Luz breaks the spell, reuniting with the two. The Collector reveals to Raine Whispers, who is possessed by Emperor Belos, that Titan magic supersedes the Collector's, and within Belos' castle lies the still-beating heart of King's father, the Titan whose body became the Boiling Isles. Belos convinces the Collector to play with Luz, Eda, and King in person, while he heads to the Titan's heart.

After repeatedly losing in games against them, the Collector confides that in the past, he befriended the younger Titans, but his race committed genocide against the Titans, and he was imprisoned by King's father. The three realize the childlike Collector does not comprehend death or empathy, so they resolve to teach him friendship by taking him to sites of their past adventures. In the meantime, Luz's friends, Amity Blight, Gus, Willow, and Hunter find themselves at the Archive House and see that the Collector has turned Camilla into a puppet.

Raine manages to purge Belos from their body but cannot prevent his merging with the Titan's heart. Belos grows a body out of his spores and begins infecting the Boiling Isles. Luz's group rushes to Belos's castle, and the Collector, inspired by Luz, tries to stop Belos with forgiveness. Belos attacks him, but Luz intercepts the blast, as her body disintegrates. Eda and King mutate into more monstrous versions of themselves and fruitlessly attack Belos in a fit of grief. Luz descends into the In-Between World, meeting King's father. He offers Luz his remaining life force for treating King kindly. Meanwhile, Camila is returned to normal as the Archive House begins to crumble, and she tells the kids about Luz’s whereabouts and convinces them to use glyphs to rescue the puppets.

Finally understanding empathy the Collector apologizes for everything. Luz reappears in a new part-Titan form, saving Eda, King, and the Collector. As Belos assumes control of the island and begins to move, the Collector protects the Archive House while Amity, Gus, Willow, Hunter, and Camila free the puppets. Luz, Eda, and King rescue Raine, and all four advance on the Titan's heart. Luz rips Belos out, disintegrating the corruption, and the Collector stops the Archive House from crashing. Back at the castle, a melting Belos feigns reformation, but Luz ignores him and Eda, King, and Raine stomp on his remains to death out of revenge. Luz returns to normal, and the Titan’s spirit departs. The Collector releases the remaining people, and everyone on the island reunites. Hoping to see King again in the future, the Collector bids farewell and departs to space. Luz, due to the Titan’s true death, learns she can no longer produce glyph magic.

Four years later, Luz packs her Earth belongings to learn wild magic under Eda at her new university. Luz's friends, now with professional careers in their signature skills, throw her a surprise belated quinceañera, as she spent her last three birthdays helping them rebuild. She also learns that King's Titan powers are beginning to manifest in a new glyph language. The Collector flies by, providing a light show; everyone waves goodbye to him and the audience.

== Production ==
According to show creator Dana Terrace, numerous scenes and storylines were cut due to Disney Television Animation cutting the season down to three episodes instead of a usual 20-episode season. According to an article by the Connecticut Insider, the sudden cutting of the season forced the show's creators to insert storylines that the creators had previously debated.

Disney Television Animation's decision to cut the season down to three episodes received mainly negative attention. Vanity Fair writer Emily St. James said that the series' "LGBTQ+ representation" caused the series to shut down despite the show's popularity. St. James would also say that the series served as a sign that American children's television had decreasing representation of LGBTQ+ people, following the cancellations of other American animated television shows, such as Steven Universe. Dana Terrace had denied that this was the cause, revealing during a Reddit AMA that it was due to a variety of factors that were beyond her control, though she has admitted that if Disney Television Animation had different people in charge, the show would have most likely lasted longer.

Three weeks after the episode aired, selected voice actors and writers for the show gave an interview on Instagram. During the interview, Terrace publicly stated that she had wanted to include Hooty more, along with wanting to expand the storylines of The Collector more. She would go on to state that two characters, Willow Park and Hunter, were made with the intention that they were pansexual and bisexual, respectively. Terrace also admitted that most of the second season was written without prior notice of the shortening of the third season, leading to several major storylines being cut from the third season. Terrace also stated that she would like to see a sequel made, but the decision to make a sequel is not up to her control, as The Walt Disney Company owns the intellectual property of The Owl House.

== Promotion ==
On March 21, 2023, Disney Channel released an official one-minute trailer for the episode onto YouTube, featuring Luz and her friends battling against both The Collector and Emperor Belos. The trailer featured Luz reuniting with her mentor, Eda Clawthorne, and her Titan best friend, King, while The Collector and Emperor Belos plotting an attack against Luz and her friends.

On April 3, the official poster for the episode, made by Terrace in collaboration with artist Andy Garner–Flexner, was released.

Right before the episode officially aired, Disney Channel aired a montage of clips from previous episodes, thanking viewers for watching the series.

== Critical reception ==
=== Ratings ===
This episode was watched by 375,000 viewers on Disney Channel and a combined audience of 500,000 viewers including the simulcast on Disney XD, making it both the most viewed Disney Channel and Disney XD premiere of 2023, beating "For the Future", the show's previous episode.

=== Reviews ===
Writer for TheGamer, Jade King, gave the episode a highly positive review, calling it "an extended dream sequence/kaiju battle/time skip that did everything it could to wrap up loose ends and leave us smiling as the credits rolled... beneath it all, core themes still managed to resonate and leave us with a message that is both bittersweet and poignant." King would praise the redemption arc for The Collector and the episode's messages, saying "The Owl House leaves us with a mantra of guilt, forgiveness, and love woven through a passage of time that stops for nobody. Clear in how we must savour each moment as it comes and recognise that making mistakes and surrendering to our emotions is precisely what makes us human... we are all worth something."

Writer for TV Source Magazine, Lee Arvoy, gave the episode a relatively positive review, but said the episode was limited in terms of character development and involvement. Speaking on the topic of Luz's friends, he said that "I wish we were able to have more of Amity, Willow, Luz and Hunter involved in the main story. They felt a bit disconnected from the main story... I felt that Hunter especially should have had more of an involvement in finally taking down Belos. His whole existence and place in the world were linked to him."

Writer for Polygon, Petrana Radulovic, wrote that "The Owl House gave us almost everything that it could've in its limited three episode final season — and also gave us a gut-punch in the finale that is going to stick with us for some time." Writer for Comic Book Resources, Marc York, wrote that "For the most part, TOH handled being cut short with grace and dignity. It still managed to flesh out the characters that really needed it, cover a lot of major plot points if not all of them, and give just about everyone a well-deserved happy ending. The action was also pretty great."

Writer for Collider, Emily Kavanagh, praised how the finale was able to handle both Emperor Belos and The Collector as villains and the nuance of forgiveness and redemption. Writer for The Pop Break, Avani Goswami, ranked that show's finale alongside the finale of She-Ra and the Princesses of Power and said that "it's bittersweet to say goodbye to a top-tier animated series that feels like a warm hug or cup of tea, but the ending proves just why the show will always be memorable, and it's so nice to see the characters' bright futures. To anyone wanting to share in a magical adventure that will make you smile, The Owl House is definitely worth a shot. It's a heartwarming series from beginning to end, and one that makes all viewers wish they could step through the door to the Boiling Isles once again for the very first time."

Writer for Autostraddle, Heather Hogan, wrote, "The series ended this weekend, triumphantly and unapologetically queer, just like its creator, Dana Terrace. And it did so as LGBTQ+ youth and trans people of all ages are under cultural and legislative attack in the United States like never before. 'Watching and Dreaming' would always have been a triumph — to close out a story with so many beloved characters, and such deep mythology, in a truncated final season mandated by spineless Disney execs is no small task — but doing so in a time of so much violence aimed at gay and trans kids feels like the firm planting of a beacon of hope." Writer for Out, Mey Rude said that "It was a perfectly fitting ending for a show that ended up changing a lot of young people's lives."
