= Fryda Wolff =

American voice actor

- Born: May 25, 1982 (age 44)
- Occupation: Voice actor
- Years active: 2003–present
- Notable work: Voice of Loba from Apex Legends, Penny & Ana from Warioware

Fryda Wolff (born May 25, 1982) is an American voice actress.

== Biography ==
Wolff is queer and bisexual.

== Filmography ==
=== Television ===
Year	Title	Role	Notes
2013	Queen's Blade Rebellion	Mimi's Sister	Voice, English dub; episode: "The Flying Pirate Ship"
2015	DC Super Friends	Poison Ivy	Voice, recurring role
2015	Bratz	Jade	Voice, main role
2015	Mobile Suit Gundam: The Origin	Mirai Yashima, young Amuro Ray	Voice, English dub
2017	Justice League Action	Faora	Voice, 2 episodes
2017–2018	Avengers Assemble	Enchantress	Voice, 3 episodes
2018–2019	Trolls: The Beat Goes On!	DJ Suki, Satin and Chenille, various voices	Voice, main role
2019	Victor and Valentino	Talon	Voice, episode: "The Boy Who Cried Lechuza"
2020	Kipo and the Age of Wonderbeasts	Dahlia	Voice, recurring role
2020–2022	Trolls: TrollsTopia	DJ Suki, Satin and Chenille, Dr. Moonbloom	Recurring role
2020–2022	The Mighty Ones	Bats	Voice, recurring role
2021–2023	The Owl House	The Collector, young Belos	Voice, recurring role
2023	Skull Island	Island Girl	Episode: "You're Not a King, You're Just a Stupid Animal"
2025	StuGo	Merian's Mom	Voice, Episode: "Sister Swim"
2025	Primos	Pacheco	Voice; Episode "Summer of Las Tóxicas"
2025	The Loud House	Camper #3	Voice; Episode "Summer Camp: Brawl of the Wild"
2026	Batman: Caped Crusader	Rose / Thorn	Voice; Episode "Her Dark Reflection"

=== Film ===
Year	Title	Role	Notes
2017	Resident Evil: Vendetta	Patricio's Wife	Voice, English dub
2022	Mobile Suit Gundam: Cucuruz Doan's Island	Mirai Yashima	Voice, English dub
2025	M3GAN 2.0	Moxie	Voice

=== Video games ===
Year	Title	Role
2003	PlanetSide	Main voice role
2010	Heroes of Newerth	Bia
2011	Rift	Tasuil
2012	Guild Wars 2	Additional voices
2013	Lightning Returns: Final Fantasy XIII	Additional voices
2013	Killer Instinct	Mira
2013	Oceanhorn: Monster of Uncharted Seas	Princess Fin, Little Girl
2014	Octodad: Dadliest Catch	Stacy, Everywoman
2014	Smite	Star Strike Neith
2014	The Elder Scrolls Online	Seryn
2014	Dawngate	Tess
2014	Project Spark	Scarlett
2014	Civilization: Beyond Earth	Narrator
2014	Call of Duty: Advanced Warfare	Additional voices
2015	The Park	Lorraine
2015	The Secret World	Lorraine
2015	Evolve	Caira
2015	Lego Jurassic World	Additional voices
2015	Fallout 4	Vault Security
2016	Gods of Rome	Athena, Medusa
2016	Street Fighter V	Information Voice
2017	Mass Effect: Andromeda	Sara Ryder
2017	Paradigm	Rebel Leader, Apple Head, Children's Book Narrator, Water Heater Mother
2017	Fortnite	Calamity
2017	Guardians of the Galaxy: The Telltale Series	Lylla
2017	Paladins	Vivian
2017	MU Legend	Whisperer
2018	Octopath Traveler	Tressa Colzione
2018	Conan Exiles	Razma of Shem
2018	WarioWare Gold	Penny Crygor, Ana
2018	Quake Champions	Nyx, Slash
2018	Just Cause 4	Gabriela Morales
2018	Thief of Thieves	Celia
2018	Darksiders III	Watcher
2018	Yo-kai Watch 3	Little Charrmer, Agent Spect-hare, Snow Spect-hare
2018	Dauntless	Katerin Sorrel
2018	Epic Seven	Bellona, Wanda, Ravi, Aither, Luluca, Hazel
2018	Fallout 76	Female Scorched, Rough Females
2018	State of Decay 2	Female Survivor
2019	Rage 2	Dusty Anna, Punchy McDuff, Goons
2019	Bloodstained: Ritual of the Night	Dominique Baldwin, Abigail Creese, Susie Quinn
2019	Shenmue III	Additional Cast
2019	Killing Floor 2	Matriarch
2019	Intruders: Hide and Seek	Ashley
2020	Apex Legends	Loba Andrade
2020	Serious Sam 4	Annabelle
2020	G.I. Joe: Operation Blackout	Lady Jaye
2020	Fallout 76: Wastelanders	Scavengers, Settlers, additional voices
2020	Bugsnax	Eggabell Batternugget, Kweeble, Poptick
2020	Cyberpunk 2077	Carol Emeka
2021	Ratchet & Clank: Rift Apart	Mysterious Stranger, Chief Engineer, Nefarious Troopers
2021	Boyfriend Dungeon	Valeria
2021	WarioWare: Get It Together!	Penny, Ana
2021	Solar Ash	Rei
2021	Naraka: Bladepoint	Yoto Hime
2022	Arcade Spirits: The New Challengers	Zapper
2025	Dune Awakening	Kara Valk
2027	Romancing SaGa 3: Destinies United	Nora
