= High Guardian Spice =

2021 American animated TV series

- Promotional image
- Genre: Magical girl; Coming-of-age; Comedy
- Created by: Raye Rodriguez
- Developed by: Claire Stenger
- Voices of: Briana Leon; Lauren White; Amber Romero; Michelle Deco
- Composer: Steven Argila
- Country of origin: United States
- Original language: English
- No. of seasons: 1
- No. of episodes: 12

Production
- Executive producers: Raye Rodriguez; Margaret Dean
- Running time: 22 minutes
- Production company: Crunchyroll Studios

Original release
- Network: Crunchyroll
- Release: October 26, 2021

High Guardian Spice is an American animated television series created by Raye Rodriguez, who formerly worked for Danger & Eggs as a character designer. The series is produced by Crunchyroll Studios (formerly named Ellation), and was originally slated to be Crunchyroll's first original series before it was delayed for approximately 2 years. The series premiered on its own streaming service on October 26, 2021.

== Premise ==
A group of four young girls who attend the High Guardian Academy are training to become guardians of West City. At the same time, they deal with friends, enemies, and betrayals, as they attempt to protect everything from an unknown threat against the world.

== Characters ==
=== Main ===
- Rosemary (voiced by Briana Leon) – A human who has pink hair and attends High Guardian Academy with her best friend, Sage. She is brash, bold, and wants to follow in the footsteps of her mother, Lavender, a former Guardian.
- Sage (voiced by Lauren White) – A witch who has blue hair and uses Old Magic. She often runs into problems with the New Magic-centered school, as she objects to New Magic.
- Parsley (voiced by Amber Romero) – A dwarf girl with blond hair who works as a blacksmith.
- Thyme (voiced by Michelle Deco) – An elf girl with red hair who is a skilled archer. She is committed to saving her home from a mysterious ailment called the Rot.

=== Supporting ===
==== High Guardian Academy students ====
- Amaryllis (voiced by Katie McVay) – A rich, snobbish and violent human girl with purple hair who goes to the academy. Despite her aggressiveness, she is a loyal and caring friend to Snapdragon.
- Snapdragon (voiced by Julia Kaye) – A snarky, awkward, ginger-haired human student, and the best friend of Amaryllis.
- Parnelle (voiced by Barbara Goodson) – The youngest male human student and a child prodigy.
- Slime Boy (voiced by Julian Koster) – A human warlock boy and second-year student who loves monsters and is a musician.
- Cal (voiced by SungWon Cho) – A student at the academy who is transphobic to Snapdragon and plays into her gender dysphoria.
- Zinnia (voiced by Cindy Robinson) – A student at the academy who wanted to avoid danger.

==== High Guardian Academy staff ====
- The Triad (voiced by Salli Saffioti) – The three immortal female human headmasters; one is young-appearing, one looks middle-aged, and the last one looks elderly.
- Professor Harkone (voiced by Anthony Brandon Walker) – A human professor who teaches battle tactics.
- Professor Caraway (voiced by Raye Rodriguez) – A trans-male human professor and Lavender's childhood friend who teaches a class on sacred alphabets.
- Moss Phlox (voiced by Audu Paden) – A satyr professor who teaches blacksmithing.
- Wyverna Dretch (voiced by Haviland Stillwell) – A female demon professor who teaches an ethics class at the academy.
- Redbud (voiced by Barbara Goodson) – A science teacher at the academy who frequently puts her students at risk in order to "test" them.

==== Antagonists ====
- Olive (voiced by Stephanie Sheh) – A catgirl working for the Triumvirate.
- Mandrake (voiced by AJ Beckles) – A human shapeshifter and warlock, who works for the Triumverate.
- Smoke Face (voiced by Audu Paden) – A smoky purple wisp-like entity.
- The Triumvirate (voiced by Audu Paden) – The mysterious governing group who are the overarching antagonists.

==== Family members ====
===== Rosemary's family =====
- Fennel (voiced by Audu Paden) – The father of Rosemary who has pink hair.
- Chicory (voiced by AJ Beckles) – The brother of Rosemary who has lavender hair.
- Lavender (voiced by Liisa Lee) – The mother of Rosemary who has lavender hair and was once a well-known Guardian.

===== Sage's family =====
- Anise (voiced by Haviland Stillwell)– Sage's lesbian cousin, who is married to an elf named Aloe (voiced by Joy Lerner).
- Sage's Mom (voiced by Michelle Deco) – The mother of Sage who appears in one episode.
- Sage's Dad (voiced by AJ Beckles) – The father of Sage who appears in one episode.

===== Thyme's family =====
- Flora (voiced by Cindy Robinson) – The mother of Thyme who visits her in the city.

===== Parsley's family =====
- Angie (voiced by Wendee Lee) – The mother of Parsley and many boys.
- Sorrel (voiced by Cam Clarke) – The father of Parsley and many boys.

===== Snapdragon's family =====
- Hawthorn (voiced by Audu Paden) – The father of Snapdragon who pushed her to be "strong" like "a boy".
- Yarrow (voiced by Audu Paden) – The brother of Snapdragon who made fun of her for being "girlish".

=== Additional characters ===
==== Merpeople ====
- Kelp (voiced by SungWon Cho) – A merperson that Parsley, Thyme, Sage, and Rosemary meet.
- Elodie (voiced by Karen Strassman) – A mermaid at the underwater academy.
- Coral (voiced by Haviland Stillwell) – A mermaid who Thyme has a crush on.

==== Creatures ====
- Neppy Cat (voiced by Cam Clarke) – A housecat near the academy who has secret powers.
- Grog (voiced by Audu Paden) – A creature that is sighted on the academy campus.
- Kino (voiced by Raye Rodriguez) – A cat at the academy.
- Demon (voiced by SungWon Cho) – A demon that Thyme tries to appeal to so she can talk to her dad.

== Production ==
=== Development ===
In 2013, Rodriguez first came up with the idea for the show and pitched it to Frederator Studios but it was rejected. It was later pitched to Crunchyroll in 2016, developed into a comic in 2017, and re-pitched in 2018 when Marge Dean started at Crunchyroll, becoming a TV show. In October 2023, Rodriguez told Melanie Cionco of Skwigly that he tried to "pitch the show for five years before it would eventually get picked up by Crunchyroll as part of their original series" and noted that he downplayed the show's queerness when he was "pitching it as a kids show for like Nickelodeon, Frederator, Cartoon Network etc."

The show began production in 2017. According to the resume of Claire Stenger, a co-developer, writer, and co-story editor for the show, she worked on pitch documents, helped with VO sessions, gave notes, and helped with the writing, between September 2017 and October 2018. The show was originally set to be released in early 2019, but was delayed. The show wrapped production in autumn 2019, as noted by Raye Rodriguez, the series creator, and Anime News Network, even though Crunchyroll missed deadlines for release in 2019 and 2020. ANN reviewer Callum May stated that negative backlash by some people to the series was why there was a lack of communication or release of the series and argued that Crunchyroll has an internal and external "communication problem".

Rodriguez stated that he produced "twelve 22-minute episodes" of the show on his official website. This number of episodes was confirmed with the official announcement of the series premiere date in October 2021. Apart from Rodriguez, who is a trans man, the show had a writers room composed completely of women, and a crew that was 50% female, and "very ethnically and LGBTQ+ diverse" according to the head of Crunchyroll Studios, then named Ellaton Studios, Margaret Dean. It was later confirmed that William Ruzicka worked as a storyboarder for the series.

In January 2022, Rodriguez revealed that the series was "significantly low budget by U.S. animation standards," saying that many of the problems people attributed to the series, in terms of writing and art, could be "attributed to this low budget." He added that even though the show was on Crunchyroll, it was a cartoon created using a similar production pipeline to American animations like those on Cartoon Network, describing the show as ambitious artistically within the schedule and budget which was provided. He also stated that Onyx Equinox learned from mistakes made on the show and was union, but had "a lot of the same team and same pipeline" and urged people to think about what happened behind the scenes while thinking about who started hatred toward the show.

=== Release ===
On February 25, 2020, Crunchyroll released a trailer for 8 original series including High Guardian Spice and seven others. (Note: The others were Onyx Equinox, In/Spectre, The God of High School, Meiji Gekken: Sword & Gun, Tower of God, Noblesse, and FreakAngels.) Previously, the series had been announced as the first project under the "Crunchyroll Originals" brand. In May 2020, Alden Budill, head of global partnerships and content strategy at Crunchyroll described the series as "anime-inspired," like Onyx Equinox but said they are created by a "team of people who both love and respect anime as an art form because they are designed and produced by true fans who seek to infuse that same spirit into their content even though it is created outside of Japan."

On September 4, 2020, Ethan Supovitz of CBR described the series as an upcoming Crunchyroll original which would come out in 2020, but gave no exact date. The same month it was revealed that Kristle Peluso, who also was a writer for Onyx Equinox and the second season of gen:LOCK, was a writer for the show. On November 15, 2020, Constance Sarantos of CBR wrote an article advocating for Crunchyroll to release the series, with the latter silent about the show's release date, noting that it received backlash when it was initially announced, but that the delay "seem[ed] ridiculous" at that point.

On May 13, 2021, Rodriguez told people to be "on the lookout" for news regarding the show later in the summer.

In June 2021, it was announced that at the virtual Crunchyroll Expo 2021, taking place from August 5–7, 2021, there will be "news" about the series, specifically at the Crunchyroll Industry Panel on August 6. The same month, Anime News Network stated that show will receive a "new release date in Summer 2021" and no other shows from the studio have been announced apart from High Guardian Spice. On August 6, 2021, a trailer for the series was released, along with new art of characters in the series In the announcement, no release date was noted, only that it will premiere soon, and that the series had magical girl influences.

On September 21, 2021, Crunchyroll listed the show as part of its Fall 2021 lineup.

On October 10, 2021, Crunchyroll revealed the release date as October 26, 2021 and cast list. The series had a 12-episode debut. Before the show's debut, Animation Magazine said that Rodriguez wants to make the world a "more loving and empathetic place by sharing fantastical stories about queer, diverse and relatable characters."

=== Influences ===
In a November 2021 interview, Rodriguez noted that he was inspired by Magic Knight Rayearth, Sailor Moon, Petite Princess Yucie, and Little Witch Academia, and described the show as having a "hybrid Eastern-Western cartoon style." He also praised the show's cast and crew, noted the representation of various body types in the show, and argued the show's message is that being a Guardian means risking your life to stand up for what you believe, while the protagonists "have to decide for themselves if this really is the path they want to walk down." Rodriguez also said that the content warnings before episodes were not put there because of him, and that the series is not "an adult show" and that while there are curse words and mild blood, it is not for "mature audiences only".

== LGBTQ representation ==
The series features various LGBTQ characters. Anise, Sage's cousin, is married to an Elf woman named Aloe, with Anise voiced by Haviland Stillwell, a lesbian woman. Professor Caraway, a professor at the High Guardian Academy, is a trans man. In the third episode "Transformations", he is revealed to be a trans man, and is voiced by the show's creator, Raye Rodriguez. Snapdragon is a trans woman. Over the course of the series, Snapdragon "Snap" figures out who she is and Caraway helps her move toward gender transition. The voice actress for Snap, Julia Kaye, confirmed that Snap is a trans woman and that Rodriguez based aspects of the character on her. Rodriguez further confirmed that Snap is a trans woman. The series also includes LGBTQ cast members like openly gay Cam Clarke (who voices Neppy Cat and Sorrel) and ambiguously queer Julian Koster (who voices Slime Boy).

In October 2021, Rodriguez was described as being "passionate about telling diverse and inclusive stories" and noted as wanting to share "fantastical stories about queer, diverse and relatable characters." In a November 2021 interview, Rodriguez noted the importance of representation and voiced optimism for inclusivity in animation. He further praised Crunchyroll for not giving any pushback to LGBTQ representation in the series, adding that in the world of High Guardian Spice, people are "generally a lot more chill about LGBTQ+ people than they are in real life."

== Episodes ==
No.	Title	Directed by	Written by	Original release date
1	"Journey to Lyngarth"	Audu Paden & Raye Rodriguez	Kate Leth, Amanda Levari, & Katie McVay	October 26, 2021
Two teenage girls, Sage and Rosemary, travel to the town of Lyngarth, where they will be going to High Guardian Academy, in order to become guardians. Once at Lyngarth, they stay the night with Sage's cousins, Anise and Aloe. While sleeping, Rosemary has a nightmare about her mother, Lavender, a well-known guardian who disappeared years ago. The next morning, Sage and Rosemary decide to explore around Lyngarth, where they meet an elf girl named Thyme, who is also going to High Guardian Academy. After the encounter, Rosemary discovers that her locket (which contains a picture of her family together) has been stolen by a creature called a Tricksie, which uses the locket to perform a mating ritual. Rosemary manages to get back her locket but it ends up breaking in half so she and Sage head over to a blacksmith's shop, where they meet Parsley, another student going to High Guardian Academy, who promises to fix Rosemary's locket and return it to her the next day.
2	"Disorientation Day"	Alan Caldwell	Kate Leth, Amanda Levari, & Katie McVay	October 26, 2021
Sage, Rosemary, Parsley, and Thyme start their first day at High Guardian Academy, where the triad, three women who run the academy, explain that at the end of the day, all new students have to write their own guardian vows. All four girls are assigned to different classes: Rosemary goes to ethics class, where she becomes enemies with a boy named Snapdragon; Parsley goes to blacksmithing class, where she ends up moving to the third class year; and Sage and Thyme go to a class on sacred alphabets, where another girl named Amaryllis constantly bullies the former. Later, Sage attends a potions class taught by Professor Rudbud, who poisons the class until Sage manages to create a potion that cures everyone before all the students give their vows.
3	"Transformations"	Amber Tornquist Hollinger	Kate Leth	October 26, 2021
Rosemary, Sage, Parsley, and Thyme focus on their skills. While talking, Rosemary looses her grip on her sword, which breaks. Later she talks to Caraway, who she learns is a close friend of her mom and that Caraway is a trans man. Parsley goes through a quest of re-hanging a portrait, which ends up being an adventure Moss Phlox came up with her, while Sage tries to learn new magic, alongside Neppy Cat. In the process, Amaryllis messes with Sage's potion, accidentally causing Neppy-Cat to become a full-grown cat monster. Ultimately, Amaryllis, Snapdragon, and Sage, along with Thyme, finally get Neppy cat under control, and Snapdragon falls in love with Sage.
4	"Past Present"	Michael Goguen	Kate Leth	October 26, 2021
Due to the school being infested by little crab-like creatures called Trabers, Rosemary, Sage, Parsley, and Thyme have to head home. Rosemary and Sage are going to Sage's cousins house, and Parsley is going home. Parsley convinces Thyme to come home with her, and Thyme reluctantly agrees. Sage admits to Rosemary that she doesn't want a terra sphere and they go to a magic shop, where they meet Slime Boy. She finds a terrasphere that she likes. Parsley criticizes her parents for wanting her to return to their shop, and refuses to apologize to her mother despite her father's urging. She attempts to defuse issues between Thyme's mother, Flora, and Thyme, but fails. Later, Parsley, Thyme, and Flora work together in order to save a brother of Parsley in the process.
5	"A Lost Cause"	Emi Yonemura	Katie McVay	October 26, 2021
As Rosemary is sleeping in her bed, Sage begins practicing new magic. Thyme and Sage go to a potions class in the greenhouse, with Sage annoyed when Amaryllis is part of her group. Rosemary and Parsley research in the library, while Snapdragon is part of their group, causing tensions. Thyme unintentionally causes Sage to cry, while Rosemary arm wrestles with Snapdragon. Thyme comes to Rosemary, Parsley, and Snapdragon, asking for help after she made Sage cry. Sage goes into a room to cry and she meets Parnelle, who has a grog named Greg with him. Amaryllis decides to tag along with Snapdragon, Rosemary, Parsley, and Thyme, who are looking for Sage. Sage and Parnelle work together to test out her new magic abilities. Slime Boy comes in the room too but to practice a crying song. Rosemary looks down the infinite hallway, while she continues to look for Sage with Snapdragon, Amaryllis, Parsley, and Thyme. Sage struggles with new magic. Snapdragon, Amaryllis, Parsley, Rosemary, and Thyme are surprised to see what happened. Thyme apologizes sincerely, with the push from Parsley, to Sage. After being encouraged, Sage is able to use new magic to free Parnelle and Slime Boy from magic bubbles and reverse the magical damage. Later, Thyme apologizes to Sage again, saying she didn't mean to hurt her feelings, and they make up.
6	"Crushing Obstacles"	Amber Tornquist Hollinger	Amanda Levari, Kate Leth, & Katie McVay	October 26, 2021
Caraway rolls magic dice, deciding they will be studying runes on challenges, growth, secrets, and relationships. Aster Tormaline joins the class taught by Professor Hakone and Rosemary falls in love with him. Later, Rosemary says hello to Aster. Snapdragon is impressed when Rosemary says that Lavender is her mom. Snapdragon and Amaryllis switch weapons and have great success. Sage asks Thyme and Parsley about Aster, with Parsley saying he is a "babe" and Thyme telling of a time she had a crush. Snapdragon and Sage practice fighting with weapons together. The class then goes through an obstacle course. Rosemary continues to deepen her crush on Aster, Parnelle and Parsley jump between moving axes, Snapdragon is annoyed with Sage, and Thyme helps out Amaryllis. Rosemary's annoyance with Aster reaches a boiling point. Parnelle and Parsley are the first ones to finish the course. Amaryllis and Thyme begin to their commonalities. Snapdragon cheers up Sage when he points out that Rosemary's crush on Aster is dead, with Snapdragon accepting Sage's offer to talk about the "heavy stuff.". Parsley drops her hammer on Aster's foot, causing Hakone to demote her to second place, making Parnelle the champion.
7	"The Cave of Vinca"	Michael Goguen	Katie McVay	October 26, 2021
The town cheers on the first-year students of High Guardian Academy, as they go on their quest inside the cave of Vinca, with Professor Dretch introducing them to the task, saying that if they fail they will forfeit their guardianship. One of the students, Zinia, leaves, saying she is too young and attractive for a "suicide mission". The mission for the students who stay is to collect a drop of magical healing waters. Parsley, Sage, Rosemary, and Thyme go off in their own direction, and encounter trabers. They fight them off, but Rosemary is injured in the process. Parsley pulls a lever on a fountain they find there is no magic water. Rosemary gets woozy from her blood loss, worrying Sage, and becomes unconscious. Ultimately, they get to the healing waters. Sage gives Rosemary the healing water. A guardian of the healing water attacks Thyme, Rosemary, Parsley, and Sage, and they come up with a plan to defeat them. They believe they are trapped in the chamber together. All four of them embrace one another in order to comfort Thyme. Sage uses the dragon egg they have, so they can all hitch a ride on the dragon out of the cave, They get back to the academy and the dragon explodes into balls of light. Thyme uses the healing water on the tree. As they step away from the tree, a catgirl named Olive appears, and she is told to kill Parsley, Sage, Rosemary, and Thyme.
8	"Festival of Fall"	Emi Yonemura	Kate McVay & Kristle Peluso; Kate Leth (part 1 only)	October 26, 2021
9	"Festival of Fall"	Emi Yonemura	Kate McVay & Kristle Peluso; Kate Leth (part 1 only)	October 26, 2021
Part 1: Olive and her cat begin looking at the rot on a tree, talking to "Smoke Face", saying that killing the girls isn't worth their time. He tells her to turn them to stone at the autumn celebration in Lyngarth. She agrees but wants to sow discord between them first. Neppy Cat is watching and goes to warn the girls. Olive schemes how to corner Thyme, Rosemary, Parsley, and Sage in the festival, believing she can turn them into stone and bring them to Witch Country. Everyone enjoys their time at the festival. All four girls go to different parts of the festival. When Cal sees what Snapdragon is wearing, he freaks out, leading Amaryllis to come to his defense. Rosemary, Sage, and Parsley walk on their own through the festival and see Aloe, Anise, and Caraway. Thyme goes to her mom's house, packs some potions, and leaves a note. Parsley stands outside her family's booth trying to get people to pay for tickets. Sage then bumps into Snapdragon. Sage and Rosemary sit at a booth together and Parsley comes to join them, with tensions between Sage and Rosemary beginning. Thyme finds the other girls and warns them they are in danger, while Neppy faces down the catgirl. Thyme, Rosemary, Parsley, Sage, and Neppy, confront Olive. Sage protects herself, Rosemary, and Thyme from Olive's spell, while everyone else is turned to stone, including Parsley and Neppy Cat. Olive is injured in the process. Part 2: With Lyngarth frozen in stone, Smoke Face tells Olive to reverse the spell. Sage, Rose, and Thyme plan to find Olive so the spell can be reversed. Meanwhile, she plans to kill the rest of them one by one. Sage tries to warn Rosemary, and later searches for her with Thyme. Olive faces Rosemary, and they fight one another, with Rosemary injuring her. Sage and Thyme find Amaryllis and Snapdragon. An injured Olive limps away, while Rosemary continues to pursue. They all confront Olive, who tells them about the Triumverate. Rosemary and Sage get angry with one another. Sage smashes the spark spell orb, causing the spell to be reversed. Rosemary, Amaryllis, Thyme, Parsley, Sage, Neppy, and Snapdragon sit on a roof together but resolve to say nothing about Olive. All of them go their separate ways. Sage says she wants to be alone with Snapdragon, surprising Rosemary, who sits on the roof alone. Amaryllis tells Parsley that she couldn't beat a game. Smoke Face talks to a scared Olive, saying the Triumverate will give her one last chance. Caraway, Aloe, and Anise hang out together at one of the booths. They are joined by Snapdragon and Sage. Rosemary walks through the festival sullenly. She sits by herself and cries.
10	"Rainy Day Memories"	Amber Tornquist Hollinger	Katie McVay	October 26, 2021
Rosemary tells a scary story about Olander and a demon friend to Parnelle and fellow students. Thyme and Parsley go to a cave, attempting to summon a demon so she can travel to the fairy woods, but it does not work. Amaryllis and Rosemary attempt to scheme together, but a spell goes wrong, resulting in all their worst memories coming to life. Meanwhile, Sage and Snapdragon talk to one another, with Snapdragon suggesting that Sage has a crush on Rosemary. Later, Rosemary and Amaryllis bond over thinking about their friends and they apologize to one another. Snapdragon chuckles at hearing that Amaryllis helped Rosemary and tells her to not be angry all the time. Parsley tells Thyme they can work on solving the blight together and to not have any more secrets. A wounded Olive, in the school's attic, sees a memory of Rosemary where she calls herself "Rosehairy".
11	"The Scypith"	Michael Goguen	Kristle Peluso	October 26, 2021
The guardians try and tame an octopus commanded by Caraway, in the river. The Triad dispatch several people for a special mission: Snapdragon, Cal, Parsley, Sage, Rosemary, and Thyme. They are to help merpeople from the underwater sister school, Serena, of High Guardian Academy. Cal insults Snapdragon for wearing a mermaid's outfit, and so Snapdragon fights back. Caraway is shocked and the kid swims away. Caraway says that Snapdragon can't go because he has a broken wrist. The girls each transform into mermaids, while Snapdragon is jealous. Underwater, the girls meet one of the students, Elodie, and go to the bastion to get away from the serpent. They later meet a seahorse named Bubbles and the other merpeople, Coral and Kelp, with Thyme having a crush on Coral. The merpeople worry about the serpent's change i attitude. Back in the academy, Amaryllis learns that Snapdragon beat up Cal and she is worried. Meanwhile, Olive reads Rose's diary. Snapdragon reveals his insecurities with being a man and Caraway tells him about transition magic, which excites Snapdragon, and he thanks Caraway for listening. Later, when the serpent attacks, Sage uses her magic and she can't stop it, causing it to be hurt grievously. Rose has to put the serpent down, ending its life. Thyme sees that the rot has reached the lake, with Caraway saying this is a bad sign.
12	"Attack on High Guardian Academy"	William Ruzicka	Kristle Peluso	October 26, 2021
In the woods outside Lyngarth, Olive meets a person named Mandrake. She releases her cat, Kino, so Mandrake doesn't kill it. Olive doesn't want to kill anyone and is told by Smoke Face that Mandrake will be in charge, and she begrudgingly agrees. Sage and Rosemary talk about the serpent. Olive and Mandrake have a disagreement on tactics. All four girls go to Caraway's office. There are two Caraways and they aren't sure which one is real, until circumstances reveal themselves. The girls depart. Mandrake pretends he is Caraway so they can lure all the teachers and students to the basement where they will be locked in a room. Mandrake fights the girls in the library and Olive ends up joining the girls' side. Ultimately, Rosemary and Sage battle Mandrake. Later, Olive is taken away in chains. Everyone looks for Mandrake, and the school burns. Rose cuts Sage's hair. Winter break starts early, with all of the girls going to separate places. Rosemary dubs herself, Sage, Parsley, and Thyme as "High Guardian Spice", a name which they all embrace. In a post-credits scene, Mandrake is brought before the Triumvirate, asking for mercy. Lavender, who is working for the Triumvirate, recommends his execution, ending the series on a cliffhanger.

== Reception ==
=== Pre-release ===
In March 2020, John Witiw of CBR said that the series reminded them of RWBY, Mysticons, and Harry Potter, while noting that the names of the characters are a reference to "Scarborough Fair", an English folk ballad made popular by Simon & Garfunkel. Another reviewer, Ethan Supovitz, also of CBR, said that the show has "a lot of anime influences", blending Eastern and Western animation, calling it reminiscent of Steven Universe, The Owl House, and Dungeons & Dragons, praising the creative team, variety of characters, while expressing worry about the show's style over substance, the number of "newcomers", familiar themes, and delay in release.

Crunchyroll's announcement of the show prompted a negative backlash from some of the site's users due to the diversity of the cast and crew and inclusion of LGBTQ+ themes. Tom Capon of Gay Star News described Rodriguez as the "creative force" behind the show, noting that he'll be "leading an all-female writing room." Callum May of Anime News Network wrote that due to response by some to the show's unveiling, Crunchyroll seemed to have put off releasing the show for almost two years.

=== Post-release ===
On public review sites, the series was review bombed. Steve Jones, in an edition of "This Week in Anime" for Anime News Network, described the series, and others under the Crunchyroll Originals brand, as likely giving the "cadre of reactionary chud grifters" a new target to "chew on in their perpetual culture war."

Melanie Cionco of Skwigly described the series as being "as queer and loud in its representation as it could" by featuring a cast of "mostly queer characters and plotlines" but lamented that the show's uncertain future left these themes, plotlines, and characters that "it wished to explicitly and openly tackle not fully developed." Jade King of The Gamer described the series as not being "afraid to showcase its queer identity" and called the characters "bright, colourful, loving." Evan Valentine, in an article for ComicBook.com, described the series as having a "unique aesthetic." Ritwik Mitra of Game Rant described the series as "pretty lighthearted and interesting," but criticized the pacing and premise, while arguing that "the LGBTQ+ representation in the show was a breath of fresh air."

Chiaki Hirai reviewed the first episode for Anime Feminist, describing it as a comfortable and "enjoyable show", praised the show's setting and story, and said that the "explicit LGBTQ positivity" stands out. However, she criticized the lack of English subtitles, saying it makes it hard for people with impaired hearing to watch the show. Madeline Carpou of The Mary Sue described the show as "middle of the road," saying the show's quality varied, but praised the show's LGBTQ representation, and said that she ultimately liked the series. Samuel Gachon of Collider said that anime-inspired series like High Guardian Spice and RWBY are "not always great."

Steve Jones of Anime News Network criticized the production pipeline and series release schedule, saying it was unlikely that Crunchyroll would talk about the series ever again, while Lucas DeRuyter, of the same site, asserting that the "Gamergate-style chuds" created issues in talking about existing controversies "surrounding the IP and CR Originals brand." Jones also expressed his belief that the series, like Onyx Equinox, had its own charm, and said he felt more positively toward the series "due to the frustrations" expressed by the series creator.

== Franchise ==
On November 12, 2021, Crunchyroll announced that a pin set of characters Rosemary, Sage, Parsley, and Thyme, in the chibi style from the show's closing credits, could be bought from the company's web store.

On December 10, 2021, Crunchyroll shared four recipes inspired by the show ranging from "sweet to savory treats".
