= Crunchyroll Studios =

American animation studio (2018–2021)

- Formerly: Ellation Studios (2018–2020)
- Industry: Animation
- Founded: August 22, 2018; 7 years ago
- Defunct: August 9, 2021; 4 years ago
- Fate: Closed due to Sony's acquisition of Crunchyroll
- Headquarters: Burbank, California, United States; Tokyo, Japan
- Number of locations: 2
- Key people: Margaret M. Dean (head of studio)
- Parent: Crunchyroll

Crunchyroll Studios (formerly known as Ellation Studios) was Crunchyroll's in-house animation studio that produced original animated shows for both it and the VRV streaming service until it was shut down in August 2021 following Sony's acquisition of Crunchyroll.

== History ==
On December 2, 2013, The Chernin Group (the holding company of former News Corp. president Peter Chernin) announced that it had acquired a controlling interest in Crunchyroll for a reported $100 million. The Chernin Group said that Crunchyroll management and existing investor TV Tokyo would maintain a "significant" stake in the company.

On April 22, 2014, AT&T and The Chernin Group announced the formation of a joint venture to acquire, invest in, and launch over-the-top (OTT) video services. Both companies committed over $500 million in funding to the venture. The new company was named Otter Media and became the majority owner of Crunchyroll. On August 3, 2015, Variety reported that Otter Media would unveil Ellation, a new umbrella company for its subscription-based video services, including Crunchyroll. Ellation's services included VRV, which debuted in 2016, a video streaming platform described as targeting "geeks, gamers and lovers of comedy, fantasy and technology."

In January 2018, Otter Media bought the remaining stake in Ellation, the owner of VRV and Crunchyroll, and integrated it as Otter Media's Consumer Division. On June 20, 2018, Recode reported that AT&T was close to buying out Chernin's stake in Otter Media, on the heel of its acquisition of Time Warner (whose digital media holdings included Machinima). On August 7, 2018, AT&T announced their acquisition of Chernin Group's stake in Otter Media for an undisclosed amount, believed to be around $1 billion. On August 22, 2018, Ellation formed Ellation Studios, a production studio with facilities in both the U.S. and Japan, to produce original content for Crunchyroll and VRV. On December 4, 2018, Otter announced a broad restructuring that would result in the layoff of about ten percent of its staff. As part of the reorganization, Machinima, which had been part of Warner Bros. Digital Networks, was re-organized under Otter Media. Ellation will now house Rooster Teeth, Crunchyroll, and VRV, while Machinima became a unit of Fullscreen.

In August 2018, the service announced an expansion into original content with the anime-inspired series High Guardian Spice, produced by Ellation Studios.

In 2013, Rodriguez first came up with the idea for the show and pitched it to Frederator Studios but it was rejected. It was later pitched to Crunchyroll in 2016, developed into a comic in 2017, and re-pitched in 2018 when Marge Dean started at Crunchyroll, becoming a TV show. In October 2023, Rodriguez told Melanie Cionco of Skwigly that he tried to "pitch the show for five years before it would eventually get picked up by Crunchyroll as part of their original series" and noted that he downplayed the show's queerness when he was "pitching it as a kids show for like Nickelodeon, Frederator, Cartoon Network etc."

The show began production in 2017. According to the resume of Claire Stenger, a co-developer, writer, and co-story editor for the show, she worked on pitch documents, helped with VO sessions, gave notes, and helped with the writing, between September 2017 and October 2018. The show was originally set to be released in early 2019, but was delayed. The show wrapped production in autumn 2019, as noted by Raye Rodriguez, the series creator, and Anime News Network, even though Crunchyroll missed deadlines for release in 2019 and 2020. ANN reviewer Callum May stated that negative backlash by some people to the series was why there was a lack of communication or release of the series and argued that Crunchyroll has an internal and external "communication problem".

On March 4, 2019, following the reconstruction of WarnerMedia's businesses, Otter Media became part of Warner Bros. Entertainment. However, on May 31, it was transferred to the WarnerMedia Entertainment division in order to oversee HBO Max. In September 2019, Crunchyroll announced it had acquired a majority stake in Viz Media Europe from Hitotsubashi Group, and later rebranded Viz Media Europe as Crunchyroll SAS. As a result, the Ellation name was moved from being Otter Media's Consumer Division to Crunchyroll's subsidiary in Moldova, and VRV was made a brand of Crunchyroll.

On February 25, 2020, Crunchyroll initially announced seven series under its Crunchyroll Originals label. They were anime or other animated series that are either co-produced or directly produced by the company. While Crunchyroll previously co-produced anime titles, this list only includes those that Crunchyroll themselves officially place under the label. Following Sony's acquisition of Crunchyroll, the brand was quietly discontinued alongside the closure of the in-house production studios.

== Productions ==
Title	First run start date	First run end date	Episodes	Notes
Onyx Equinox	November 21, 2020	December 26, 2020	12	Original work created by Sofia Alexander.
High Guardian Spice	October 26, 2021	October 26, 2021	12	Original work created by Raye Rodriguez.
FreakAngels	January 27, 2022	January 27, 2022	9	Adaptation of webcomic written by Warren Ellis and illustrated by Paul Duffield.
Meiji Gekken: 1874	January 14, 2024	March 24, 2024	10	Original work created by Tsukasa Sakurai and Naoki Tozuka. Final production by the studio.
