= Onyx Equinox =

2020 animated television series

- Promotional poster
- Genre: Action; Adult animation; Adventure; Science fantasy
- Created by: Sofia Alexander
- Written by: Various
- Directed by: Various
- Starring: Olivia J Brown; Alejandro Vargas-Lugo; Sofia Alexander
- Composer: Gustavo Farias
- Countries of origin: United States; Mexico
- Original language: English
- No. of episodes: 12

Production
- Executive producers: Sofia Alexander; Margaret M. Dean
- Producers: Allison Monterosso; Marisa Balkus
- Animators: Tiger Animation; DR Movie
- Editors: Don Devine; Katherine Duffy
- Running time: 23–25 minutes
- Production company: Crunchyroll Studios

Original release
- Network: Crunchyroll
- Release: November 21 – December 26, 2020

Onyx Equinox is a Mexican-American adult animated television series created by Sofia Alexander for Crunchyroll. It is based on the mythologies of Mesoamerica, featuring deities of Aztec, Maya and Zapotec myth, while also making references to the Olmecs.

The series premiered on November 21, 2020. Alexander said that she hoped that fans of Western animation would "see the appeal of action-drama animation for adults." While Alexander was initially nervous about pitching the show due to the lack of "stories about Mesoamerica," a Crunchyroll executive, Marisa Balkus, loved the pitch, and the show became "the first original series to be produced entirely out of Crunchyroll Studios."

== Synopsis ==
The Mexican god of the underworld, Mictlantecuhtli, has begun stealing blood sacrifices from the other gods, culminating in a Zapotec city being leveled. To these ends, Quetzalcoatl decides to close the gates to the underworld, but can't due to said gates being made of obsidian, which is toxic against the gods. So instead he makes a bet with Tezcatlipoca: he will find a human, "the lowest of the low", and crown him his champion so he will close the gates before the equinox, when Tezcatlipoca will kill off humanity. Tezcatlipoca agrees to the bet, but sends his champion Yaotl along as an emissary so Quetzalcoatl doesn't cheat.

Quetzalcoatl chooses Izel, a slave who lost his sister to blood sacrifice.

== Characters ==
=== The Champions ===
- Izel (voiced by Olivia J Brown): A young Aztec boy who immigrated to the Mayas along with his sister, whom he later lost to a blood sacrifice and begins to resent humanity for it.
- Yaotl (voiced by Alejandro Vargas-Lugo): A jaguar emissary of Tezcatlipoca who is harsh on Izel trying to fulfill his destiny. His name means 'The Enemy' in Nahuatl.
- Yun (voiced by Patrick Pedrazza): A good-humored and friendly Maya teenager who plays Ulama ballgames and the twin brother of K'in.
- K'in (voiced by Juan Arturo Maldonado): An abrasive and sarcastic Maya teenager who plays Ulama ballgames and the twin brother of Yun.
- Zyanya (voiced by Carolina Ravassa): A warrior Zapotec woman who lost her city, destroyed by the king of the underworld, Mictlantecuhtli.
- Xanastaku (voiced by Kimberly Woods): A 16 years old Totonac priestess in Izel'z party who desires to redeem her dark past.

=== The Gods ===
- Cástulo Guerra as Mictlantecuhtli
- Arin Hanson as Tezcatlipoca
- Zeus Mendoza as Quetzalcoatl
- Fayna Sanchez as The Healer/Mictecacihuatl
- Alicia Ross as Tzitzimitl
- SungWon Cho as Xolotl

=== Supporting characters ===
- Sofia Alexander as K'i'ik, Meque, and Nelli
- Sanchez and Octavio Solorio as Zyanya's parents

== Episodes ==
No.	Title	Directed by	Written by	Original release date
1	"The Last Day"	Kevin Altieri	Charlie Reeves	November 21, 2020
Using an ancient dimensional gate built beneath it by the Olmecs, Mictlantecuhtli, Lord of the Underworld, attacks the city of Dani Baán, stealing its blood sacrifices from the gods and wiping out its populace. Undergoing an extended period of "blood draught" and receiving fewer sacrifices of late, the four principal higher gods Huitzilopochtli, Xipe Totec, Tezcatlipoca and Quetzalcoatl agree that Mictlantecuhtli's actions constitute drastic measures as his theft may lead to a war with Mictlantecuhtli for human offerings. To that end, they entrust Quetzalcoatl to close the five gates to the Underworld situated in various locations around Mesoamerica, cutting Mictlantecuhtli off from further theft of their divine sustenance. Suspect of his intensions due to the latter's manifest family ties in the Underworld, Tezcatlipoca informs Quetzalcoatl that he intends to destroy this era of humanity on the following equinox, but Quetzalcoatl coerces him into a wager: unable to directly work the Olmec obsidian gates himself as they are repellent to gods and mystic beings, he will choose the "lowest of the low" among humans to close them all instead before Tezcatlipoca's deadline. Should said champion manage before then, humanity will be spared. Should they fail, humanity will be destroyed. In either case, the additional prize is the respective winner's human offerings, sentencing the loser to blood starvation. Tezcatlipoca accepts. In Uxmal, a young Aztec boy named Izel and his elder sister Nelli, both slaves to a fair man, learn of what has transpired in Dani Baán and Izel is to be sacrificed to Mictlantecuhtli by the city elders to protect Uxmal from meeting the same fate. Nelli willingly insists on taking his place and is sacrificed in the city temple as a horrified Izel watches. In his grief, Izel leaps into the well by the temple in an attempt at suicide (and reconciliation with Nelli), only to be touched by a mysterious Underworld creature moments before he can cross through the gate, an act which inadvertently restores him to life, changing his eye colour to turquoise. Before he can drown again, Izel is rescued by a mystical panther which proclaims that the scrawny boy is a poor choice for humanity's apparent saviour.
2	"Jaws of the Jaguar"	Kuni Tomita	Joshua Pruett	November 28, 2020
Jaguar emissary Yaotl informs Izel of his task to close the five gates to the Underworld. An unexpected foe forces Izel to confront his destiny.
3	"Thicker Than Water"	Emi Yonemura	Joshua Pruett	December 5, 2020
Izel heads to Ox Te’ Tuun to retrieve an artifact containing the map to the gates. There, he meets twin Ulama ballplayers, as well as a mysterious figure from his past.
4	"The Stranger"	Ken Wong	Jennifer Muro & Charlie Reeves	December 12, 2020
Izel, K’in and Yun head towards the second gate at Lakamha, where they encounter a warrior looking to bargain.
5	"Predation"	Kevin Altieri	Kristle Peluso	December 19, 2020
As the group heads for Danibaan, one of them suffers a horrifying injury. With nowhere left to turn, they seek help from a mysterious healer.
6	"What She Carries"	Emi Yonemura	Charlie Reeves	December 26, 2020
After an unexpected shift in plans, the group find themselves in the remote city of Tajin, where they are immediately arrested for a crime they didn't commit.
7	"The Underworld"	Ken Wong	Joshua Pruett & Charlie Reeves	December 26, 2020
The group becomes trapped in the Underworld. Zyanya struggles to hide her secret.
8	"Run"	Kevin Altieri	Charlie Reeves	December 26, 2020
Mictecacihuatl sends the group to Dani Baán. Zyanya's secret is revealed.
9	"Death From Above"	Emi Yonemura	Joshua Pruett	December 26, 2020
On the run from Mictecacihuatl, the group seeks refuge in a remote village.
10	"Death From Below"	Ken Wong	Jennifer Muro, Joshua Pruett & Charlie Reeves	December 26, 2020
Reeling from Mictecacihuatl's attacks, the group reconvenes at the final gate. Tensions run high as Yaotl's motives are scrutinized.
11	"The Last Year"	Kevin Altieri	Charlie Reeves	December 26, 2020
A glimpse into the past reveals the true machinations of the Gods.
12	"The Bet"	Kuni Tomita & Ken Wong	Jennifer Muro, Kristle Peluso, Joshua Pruett & Charlie Reeves	December 26, 2020
As the final gate looms and the Gods close in, Izel faces an impossible choice.

== Release ==
The show was released on November 21, 2020. A trailer was released on June 25. A second trailer showing off the show's characters was released on September 4, 2020, with a final trailer on October 29. On November 11, 2020, Crunchyroll announced that the series would be dubbed in English, Spanish, Portuguese, French, and German upon release. Crunchyroll released the remaining seven episodes of the series on December 26, 2020 due to a high demand of viewers wanting to binge the series rather than waiting weekly for new episodes through February 2021.

On May 18, 2021, it was announced Sentai Filmworks picked up the home video rights. It was released on Blu-ray on February 22, 2022.

In January 2022, Alexander revealed that the budget of Onyx Equinox was "near 1/3 of a lot of western shows" and said a main reason they unionized was because she "threatened to leave before production started." She also said that she was grateful to Crunchyroll because she wouldn't have been able to have a story about grief and trauma and have LGBTQ characters on other platforms.

In May 2023, Alexander reported that Crunchyroll could not find production assets for episodes 4-12 of the series because of "how they archived it" and said she never made copies because "it wasn't allowed."

On November 5, 2023, Alexander announced that the series had been cancelled, due to "various reasons out of [her] control".

== Awards ==
In early December 2020, Onyx Equinox creator Sofia Alexander received Animation Magazine's "New Voice of the Year" award.

== Reception ==
Ederlyn Peralta of CBR said that the series is unique, with "mesmerizing and highly-detailed character designs for the gods" of Mesoamerican culture and noted that while it is an adult animation, due to the "gore, profanity and sexual content," it, in their opinion, fails to have "quality character development for Izel and his comrades," and reported that some viewers believe that the protagonists are annoying and unlikeable because of their "whining." In contrast, Monique Thomas and Steve Jones of Anime News Network praised the series, calling it a "big landmark for animation," as it is the first animated series produced by Crunchyroll and has a "diverse staff." They also argued that the series has more in common with Western animation than anime, arguing it is anime inspired, and an original "action-fantasy for adults" while pointing out the curse words and violence. Thomas and Jones had one criticism, not of the show, but of Crunchyroll, asking why the show did not have English subtitles, leading one of the reviewers to watch using the Spanish subtitles instead. Melissa Camacho of family-oriented non-profit Common Sense Media noted the "brutal violence" and nudity in the series while calling it "an adult-oriented anime series set in ancient Mesoamerican history" with a "great plot" that is "worthy of your time." Raye Rodriguez, the creator of High Guardian Spice, recommended the series, calling it a "dark adult animation" which has "unique storytelling," beautiful music and art, and encouraged his followers to help it get a second season. Anime Feminist was more critical, saying that while there is "genuine enthusiasm" for the series, the first episode left them feeling angry, tired, and emotionally drained, arguing that the depiction of human sacrifices is a big gripe they have with the series, saying as it is an "overused narrative" in popular depictions, and asked "who was Onyx Enquinox made for?"
