= Sofia Alexander =

Mexican animator and voice actor

- Born: Sofia Eugenia Alexander; Quintana Roo, Mexico
- Occupations: Animator, writer, storyboard artist, voice actress
- Years active: 2016–present
- Known for: Onyx Equinox; Infinity Train; Stretch Armstrong and the Flex Fighters; Invader Zim: Enter the Florpus; The Powerpuff Girls
- Spouse: Anna Lencioni (m. 2019)

Sofia Eugenia Alexander is a Mexican animator, storyboard artist and voice actress known for her work as the executive producer and creator of the show Onyx Equinox and her storyboarding for Stretch Armstrong and the Flex Fighters, Infinity Train and The Powerpuff Girls reboot.

== Early life ==
Alexander was born in Quintana Roo, Mexico. She grew up around archeological sites such as temples from the Mayan civilization. Her grandfather was proud of their indigenous culture and saw it as something important to teach Alexander, so he often told her stories and made sure she visited archeological sites such as the temple Uxmal in Mexico. While growing up in Mexico, Alexander had access to a lot of anime as it aired on television and watched shows such as Dr. Slump, Dragon Ball, Mikan Enikki, Rurouni Kenshin, and Wolf's Rain, as did Saint Seiya, and Cardcaptor Sakura, the latter which inspired her to draw. She later said that while she was discouraged from drawing art influenced by anime, she was determined to have it influence Onyx Equinox, with the anime aesthetic appealing to her.

== Career ==
=== Early work ===
Alexander worked as a storyboard revisionist for 28 episodes of The Powerpuff Girls reboot series, which aired on 2016 from to 2019. She also was a writer for episode "Splitsville". This job was how she began working in the animation industry, as a freelancer. Following this, she worked as a storyboard artist for Stretch Armstrong and the Flex Fighters (2017–2018), a Netflix series. She was a storyboard artist on nine episodes and storyboard revisionist for five episodes. Alexander later said that while her work on The Powerpuff Girls was helpful for storyboarding, she had to learn to become a showrunner on the job.

=== Onyx Equinox ===
Alexander is best known for her series, Onyx Equinox. Prior to its release, she described it as an "adult story" in terms of themes and action, with Izel forced to "save a world he doesn’t believe he has a place in," facing darkness in "the world and within himself." She specifically emphasized specific colors in the show, with pink and turquoise representing historical symbolism in Mesoamerica Mexico. She later revealed that she began the series as a comic strip during college, which featured a few of the show's characters, and was inspired by the Lord of the Rings, The Legend of Zelda, and Aliens, wanting something similar in Mesoamerican mythology.

She began developing the story and its cast of characters in 2007, then developed a pitch for the series in 2011, but took her years of pitching it to companies such as Frederator, Netflix, and Crunchyroll, before it was picked up. Marisa Balkus of Crunchyroll, the Executive Producer in charge of original development of the streaming service, approved the show, after Alexander pitched it in early 2018, arguing that Mesoamerican Mexican culture isn't often portrayed on television and would be interesting to portray in an anime story medium. Writing on the series began in October 2018.

The series premiered on Crunchyroll in October 2020. Alexander served as the creator, illustrator, and executive producer of Onyx Equinox. She also voiced the character K'i'ik, the weapon which "grows stronger once it tastes blood." Alexander described the series having a touch of anime combined with "truly Mesoamerican characters" and stated that the show was the result of researching ancient civilizations in Mesoamerica. She also said the series allowed to see the beauty in her own culture and heritage and said that she had the chance to be mentored by Japanese animator Kuni Tomita who also served as supervising director, with Tomita guiding her in being the head of the show. She characterized Tomita as an "animation mom" and an "empowering and incredible force" while noting that Tomita warned her against animating detailed designs of gods, saying animators will hate her for making them do it, and she justified it by saying it is important culturally. Alexander has also provided her voice for characters such as Nelli, and Meque, was a show writer, and a storyboarder for the episode "The Bet."

Alexander, in a November 2020 interview with CBR, shared her challenge with pitching the series and wanting to do it with "dignity and respect towards Mexico and Indigenous Mexicans" and said that Crunchyroll had been "wonderful to the project." She called the series a translation between her experiences "into the writer's room and into animation." She also called the series a "Mexican project," said she found many of the cast and crew from her personal collections and social media, but said that the show is not an anime, from her perspective, and called Crunchyroll a "great platform" to tell the show's story. However, in August 2020, Alexander had said that creators of animation do not have a say in the marketing of their shows. In other interviews, Alexander described the show as "a love letter to Mexico and to other Mexicans," argued that blood is a main part of the story but not something to fear, said that the show tries to introduce people to Mesoamerican myths. Alexander also said that she hoped that fans of Western animation would "see the appeal of action-drama animation for adults" and stated that the series had help from an archaeologist/anthropologist and extensive research to ensure certain aspects of the show's world are inspired by actual history.

In December 2020, Alexander was nominated at Animation Magazine's 2020 Hall of Fame Awards and won The New Voice of the Year Award for her work on Onyx Equinox.

In January 2021, Alexander floated the possibility of a second season of Onyx Equinox. In early November 2023, Alexander announced that the series had been cancelled, due to "various reasons" beyond her control, thanked fans, said she would share details on the story she had planned for season 2, and asked people to keep supporting Mexican creators. Prior to this, Alexander said that she wouldn't have "been able to represent LGBT+ characters or a story about trauma and grief anywhere else" and was grateful to Crunchyroll despite the budget being "near 1/3 of a lot of western shows" and added that they unionized because she "threatened to leave before production started."

=== Other work ===
Alexander worked as a storyboarder on another animated series, Infinity Train, which aired 2019 to 2020. She storyboarded five episodes. (Note: Specifically "The Map Car", "The Past Car", "The Unfinished Car", "The Crystal Car" and "The Grid Car") She also worked as a concept artist for Disney Imagineering and their division of theme park design. In 2019 she was a storyboarder for the film Invader Zim: Enter the Florpus. She described working with the crew of Infinity Train as a full-time storyboard artist as a "pleasure" and said that story of the animated series is "beautiful" while saying her experience storyboarding on the show helped her with boarding for Onyx Equinox.

In August 2020, Alexander appeared at a panel about women in animation, alongside Rebecca Sugar and Julia Pott, among other creatives, at the Pixelatl Festival in Mexico.

In October 2020, Alexander signed a petition calling for better Latinx representation in Hollywood.

In March 2021, she appeared at a virtual event for South by Southwest on "animating resilience." She described the animation progress as like "Christmas every day" with new aspects every day, and said that the editing process can be like a "game of telephone."

In June 2021, she appeared on a panel at the Annecy International Animation Film Festival on the influence of anime on creators, with Alexis Hunot, the directors of Wolfwalkers (Tomm Moore) and The Red Turtle (Michael Dudok de Wit), executive producer of We Bare Bears (Manny Hernandez) and a live-action directing team (Hélène Cattet and Bruno Forzani). At the panel, Alexander talked about how the anime shows she watched when she was younger influenced Onyx Equinox.

In September 2021, Alexander announced that she'll be working with Marvel Studios on an unspecified project, with some speculating it may be the second season of What If...?. The project was later revealed to be X-Men '97 and Eyes of Wakanda. She also was a storyboarder for several episodes of the Crunchyroll series, High Guardian Spice which premiered in October 2021. (Note: Specifically "The Cave of Vinca", "Crushing Obstacles", "Past Present" and "Transformations")

In November 2021, Alexander appeared at a panel discussion about Indigenous women in animation at LA Skins Fest.

In September 2023, Alexander announced that she joined the staff for the revival of Phineas And Ferb at Disney Television Animation as Assistant Director and Storyboard Artist. In March 2024, Alexander mentioned that she was developing a new project at Disney TVA.

In August 2026, Alexander announced that she joined Glitch Productions as Supervising Director and writer for Knights of Guinevere.

== Personal life ==
Alexander is married to Anna Lencioni, an animator and artist, and worked on Onyx Equinox. Lencioni went to the same college as Alexander, the Savannah College of Art and Design, Both Alexander and Lencioni have been together for over ten years and Lencioni was crucial in getting Alexander to pitch Onyx Equinox to Crunchyroll. Alexander has two brothers and her entire family lives in Mexico. She currently lives in the United States and her birthday is June 4.

== Filmography ==
=== Film ===
| Title | Year | Credited as | | | | | Role | Notes |
| Title | Year | Director | Writer | Producer | Animation/Art | Other | Role | Notes |
|---|---|---|---|---|---|---|---|---|
| Invader Zim: Enter the Florpus | 2019 | No | No | No | No | Yes | N/A | Storyboard artist |

=== Animated series ===
| Title | Year | Credited as | | | | Voice role | Notes |
| Title | Year | Writer | Executive Producer | Director | Animation/Art | Voice role | Notes |
|---|---|---|---|---|---|---|---|
| The Powerpuff Girls | 2016 | Yes | No | No | Yes | N/A | Storyboard revisionist |
| Stretch Armstrong and the Flex Fighters | 2017-2018 | No | No | No | Yes | N/A | Storyboard artist |
| Infinity Train | 2019-2020 | No | No | No | Yes | N/A | Storyboarder |
| Onyx Equinox | 2020 | Yes | Yes | No | Yes | Meque / Nelli / K'i'ik | Also creator and storyboarder |
| High Guardian Spice | 2021 | No | No | No | Yes | N/A | Storyboard artist |
| X-Men '97 | 2024 | No | No | No | Yes | N/A | |
| Phineas And Ferb | 2025 | No | No | Yes | Yes | N/A | Assistant Director and storyboard artist. |
| Eyes of Wakanda | 2025 | No | No | No | Yes | N/A | Storyboard Artist |
| Knights of Guinevere | 2025-Present | Yes | No | Yes | Yes | N/A | Special Thanks; Supervising Director |
