= SungWon Cho =

American YouTuber (born 1990)

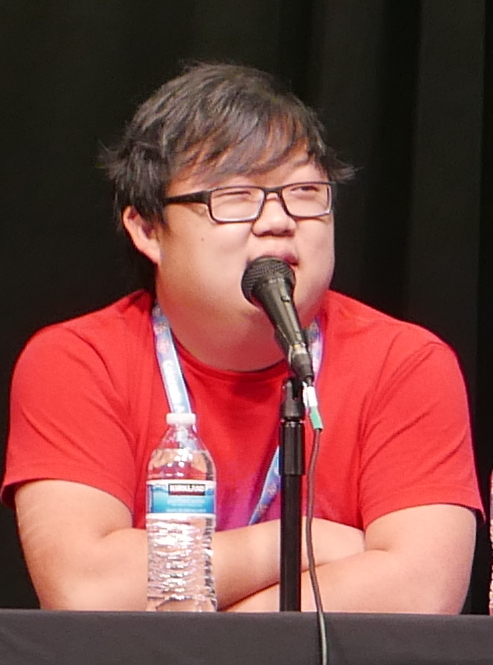
- Cho in 2022
- Born: December 9, 1990 (age 35); Rochester, Minnesota, U.S.
- Other name: ProZD
- Education: Michigan State University (BS)
- Occupations: YouTuber; actor
- Years active: 2015–present
- Spouse: Anne Marie Salter (m. 2016)

YouTube information
- Channel: ProZD
- Years active: 2006–present
- Genres: Comedy; parody; gaming; review; food
- Subscribers: 3.93 million
- Views: 2.03 billion

Korean name
- Hangul: 조성원
- RR: Jo Seongwon
- MR: Cho Sŏngwŏn
- SungWon Cho's voice Cho discussing his voice acting career Recorded 2025
- Last updated: July 22, 2026

SungWon Cho (/ˈsʌŋwʌn/ SUNG-wun; Korean: 조성원; born December 9, 1990), also known as ProZD, is an American YouTuber and actor. On his YouTube channel, Cho produces short comedy skits, unboxing videos, and reviews of board games, anime and snack foods. He is also known for his many voice acting roles, including FL4K from Borderlands 3, Holst Sigiswald Goneril from Fire Emblem Warriors: Three Hopes, Ratatoskr from God of War Ragnarök, Abby Saja from KPop Demon Hunters, and Senshi from Delicious in Dungeon. His live-action roles include Detective Joe Furuya in Anime Crimes Division and Ritchie Cheung in BlackBerry.

== Early life ==
Cho was born to South Korean parents in Rochester, Minnesota, on December 9, 1990, and later moved to DeWitt, Michigan. He started voice acting in high school when he voiced different characters on a friend's radio plays. He attended Michigan State University, where he frequently acted in live performances and graduated in 2012 with a Bachelor of Science degree in Media Information and Technology. In 2012, after graduating, he described himself as being "in a creative rut" and taught English as a second language to Korean immigrant students.

== Career ==
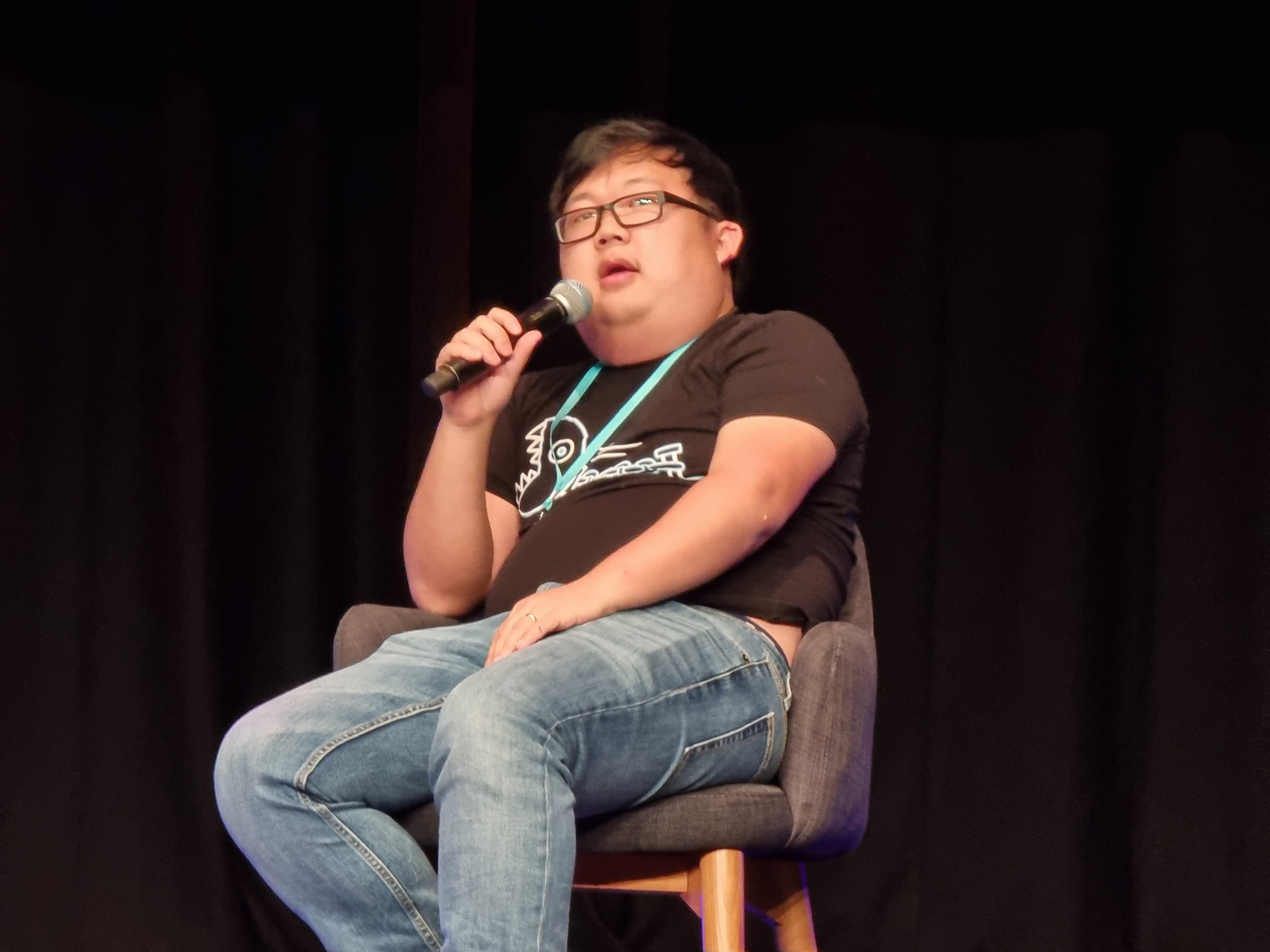
Cho presenting at his panel at SMASH 2023 in Sydney, Australia

In October 2012, Cho began daily posting voice content to Tumblr, building an audience and eventually going viral with a video of him singing "Let It Go" from Frozen while approximating the voice of Goofy. His first foray into professional voice acting occurred when voice director Deven Mack saw one of his YouTube videos and had him audition for Apotheon, where he ended up securing the role of the main villain Zeus. He remained active on Vine until the 2016 announcement of their shutdown and was also a finalist for the 9th Shorty Awards for Vine of the Year. Cho shifted his focus to his YouTube channel, his audience following from Vine and having his work often appear on the frontpage of Reddit.

Cho's presence on YouTube grew throughout this time with his channel exceeding 3.75 million subscribers and most of his income between voice acting work coming from sponsorships and ad revenue. His videos are intentionally low-budget and often feature recurring universes with their own casts of characters, including an anime parody ("The Tomoko Chairem Anime Canon") and a role-playing game parody ("King Dragon"), through which he pokes fun at common gaming and anime cliches and tropes. He continued to expand these existing storylines that had originally started on Vine, as well as creating a Let's Play channel Press Buttons n Talk with his friend Alex Mankin. In 2019, Cho voiced the character FL4K in the video game Borderlands 3. He is a frequent guest at conventions and presenting for the Crunchyroll Anime Awards. In 2021, Cho began a new Let's Play channel ProZD Plays Games with his friend and video editor, Jay Choi. The channel has now reached over 100,000 subscribers and Choi has transitioned as full-time editor for both of Cho's YouTube channels while being succeeded as co-host by their friend, Steve Yurko.

In 2017, Cho starred in his first live action role as the main character, Detective Joe Furuya, in Crunchyroll's Anime Crimes Division, for which he was nominated for Best Acting in a Comedy for the 8th Streamy Awards. In mid-2018 Creative Artists Agency reached out and signed him coinciding with an already planned move to Los Angeles to continue his career as a voice actor. Soon after he was cast in the multi-ethnic Rooster Teeth series Gen:Lock and told NewsWeek's Phillip Martinez, "Voice acting gives me a lot more freedom because I'm not limited by my physical appearance. I can voice all different sorts of characters." In 2023, Cho made his live-action film debut, playing a supporting role in BlackBerry. He voiced Orville Park in Knights of Guinevere, an independent animated series co-created by Dana Terrace, John Bailey Owen, and Zach Marcus, which released its pilot episode on September 19, 2025.

== Personal life ==
In October 2015, Cho became engaged to Anne Marie Salter, a professional illustrator he met through an online Super Mario fan fiction community. They married on May 28, 2016. They have two cats named Effie and Sophie, who are often seen in Cho's videos.

Cho came up with the username "ProZD" in elementary school, and said that he would not disclose what it means as "it's so embarrassing that even my wife doesn't know." On April 26, 2022, Cho tweeted that he had finally revealed the meaning of the username to his wife after being together for fourteen years.

== Filmography ==
=== Film ===
Year	Title	Role	Notes
2018	Something	Film actor	Voice role; feature film
2021	Belle		Voice role (English dub); feature film
2023	Lackadaisy	Mordecai Heller	Voice role; short film
2023	BlackBerry	Ritchie Cheung	First live-action film role
2025	KPop Demon Hunters	Abby Saja, Bathhouse Patron, Social Media Fan	Voice role; feature film
2025	In Your Dreams	Chad	Voice role; feature film

=== Television ===
Year	Title	Role	Notes	Ref.
2018	Legend of the Galactic Heroes: Die Neue These	Vice Admiral Legrange	1 episode, English dub	
2018	Radiant	Master Lord Majesty	3 episodes	
2019	Gen:Lock	Heng Li 'Henry' Wu	3 episodes	
2019	OK K.O.! Let's Be Heroes	Johnny, Jack Whacky, Rando, Teamster, Game	2 episodes	
2019	Tuca & Bertie	Ultra-Sam S380	Episode: "Yeast Week"	
2020	Aggretsuko	Hyodo	9 episodes, English dub	
2020	Akudama Drive	Shark	English dub	
2020	Big City Greens	Maestro / King Violin	1 episode	
2020	Craig of the Creek	Keun Sup "The Blur"	4 episodes	
2020–24	Pokémon	Delibird, Carnivine, Sidian	Season 23: Pokémon Journeys: The Series; Season 26: Pokémon Horizons: The Series; English dub	
2021	Adventure Time: Distant Lands	Brain Wizard, Ogrefied Yolk, Wizard Cop	Ep. "Wizard City"	
2021	Ranking of Kings	Kage	Main role, English dub	
2021	One Piece	Nekomamushi	Recurring role, English dub	
2021	86	Richard Altner	Recurring role, English dub	
2021	The Irregular at Magic High School	Kotaro Tatsumi	English dub	
2022	Odd Taxi	Kensuke Shibagaki	English dub	
2022	Tokyo 24th Ward	Hiroki Shirakaba	English dub	
2022	Birdgirl	Additional Voices		
2022	Batwheels	Badcomputer, the Riddler		
2022	Pantheon	Teacher	Voice	
2023	Record of Ragnarok	Kajinosuke Tanikaze	Season 2, English dub	
2023	Pluto	Brau 1589	English dub	
2023–present	Gremlins: Secrets of the Mogwai	Circusmaster		
2024	Moon Girl and Devil Dinosaur	General Hyles	Episode: "Dancing With Myself"	
2024	Delicious in Dungeon	Senshi	Main role	
2024	Solo Leveling	Woo Jin-chul		
2024	Sausage Party: Foodtopia	Additional voices	7 episodes	
2024	Beastars	Sagwan	Season 3; recurring role	
2024	Jentry Chau vs. the Underworld	Maz, Right Lion, Left Lion		
2024–present	Batman: Caped Crusader	Matt Milligan, Morris, Dr. Peterson, Carmine Broome, Thomas Dalton		
2025	Sakamoto Days	Boiled		
2026	The Ghost in the Shell	Daisuke Aramaki		
2026	Dang!	Peter		
2026	Golden Axe	Narrator		

=== Web series ===
Year	Title	Role	Notes	Ref.
2017–2018	Anime Crimes Division	Detective Joe Furuya	Main character, first live-action role	
2018	Nomad of Nowhere	Toro	Episode 7	
2018	Camp Camp	Brian	Season 3, episode 3	
2018	Red vs. Blue	King Atlus Arcadium Rex	8 episodes	
2020	Bigtop Burger	Doctor	5 episodes	
2020	Pokémon: Twilight Wings	Mustard, Mienshao	Episode : "The Gathering of Stars", English dub	
2020	Onyx Equinox	Xolotl	2 episodes	
2021	High Guardian Spice	Cal, Kemp, Demon	5 episodes	
2021	asdfmovie	Various	asdfmovie14	
2022	The Hamlet Factory	Birmy	Episode: "Performance Review"	
2022	Samurai Rabbit: The Usagi Chronicles	Lord Kogane, Warimashi, Head Keisatsukan		
2022	Make Some Noise	Himself	Episode: "A Villain and Their Real Estate Agent Tour Volcano Lairs"	
2022	Drawtectives: Celestial Spear	Villainius	Episode: "Episode 7"	
2023–present	Lackadaisy	Mordecai Heller	5 episodes	
2024	Game Changer	FixItMan78 / Himself	Episode: "Deja Vu"	
2025	Critical Role	Hasporo	Episode: "Avowed One-Shot"	
2025	Drawtectives: Midnight Alley	Kragor Skullbreaker	Episode: "A City on Fire"	
2025–present	Knights of Guinevere	Orville Park, Sir Arthur, unnamed extras		
2026	Parlor Room	Himself		

=== Video games ===
Year	Title	Voice role	Notes	Ref.
2014	Ace Attorney Investigations 2	Gregory Edgeworth	Fan translation	
2015	Apotheon	Zeus		
2016	Move or Die	Announcer		
2017	Battlerite	Sirius		
2017	Fallen Legion	G'ndarark the Bloodhammer		
2017	A Hat in Time	Express Owls, Intercom		
2017	2064: Read Only Memories	Froyo Guy, Bouncers, and Police ROMs		
2018	Monster Prom	Brian, Interdimensional Prince		
2018	2MD: VR Football	Coach		
2018	Unavowed	Kalash		
2018	BattleCON: Online	King Alexian XXXVII		
2018	Attack of the Earthlings	Regional Manager Dennis Dickinham		
2018	Wonder Wickets	Leo		
2019	Judgment	Tashiro	English dub	
2019	Akash: Path of the Five	Caspian		
2019	River City Girls	Nishimura		
2019	Borderlands 3	FL4K		
2020	Granblue Fantasy Versus	Vaseraga, Imperial Soldier	English dub	
2020	Yakuza: Like a Dragon	Mitsuo Yasumura	English dub	
2020	Forgotten Waters	Captain Jesbut J Vance		
2020	Soulcalibur VI	Hwang Seong-gyeong	English dub	
2020	Fire Emblem Heroes	Darros, Holst Sigiswald Goneril	English dub	
2021	Persona 5 Strikers	Additional voices	English dub	
2021	Genshin Impact	Krosl, Uncle Dai, Bravo	English dub	
2021	Scarlet Nexus	Additional voices	English dub	
2021	Disgaea 6: Defiance of Destiny	Misedor, Cameo Zombie	English dub	
2021	Boyfriend Dungeon	Sunder the Talwar		
2021	Mary Skelter Finale	Jabberwock		
2021	Lost Judgment	Tesso, Tashiro	English dub	
2021	Monster Hunter Rise	Hibasa	English dub	
2022	Shadow Warrior 3	Zilla		
2022	Phantom Breaker: Omnia	Phantom	English dub	
2022	Rune Factory 5	Bandit, Oswald	English dub	
2022	Arcade Spirits: The New Challengers	Domino		
2022	Neon White	Mikey		
2022	AI: The Somnium Files – Nirvana Initiative	Gen Ishiyagane	English dub	
2022	Fire Emblem Warriors: Three Hopes	Holst Sigiswald Goneril	English dub	
2022	Nine Noir Lives	Kibbler, Tybalt Magtheridon, Ticket Salescat		
2022	God of War Ragnarök	Ratatoskr	Also motion capture and writing assistance	
2022	River City Girls 2	Nishimura	English dub	
2023	Master Detective Archives: Rain Code	Number One of the WDO	English dub	
2023	Advance Wars 1+2: Re-Boot Camp	Eagle, Flak	English dub	
2023	Detective Pikachu Returns	Will Butler	English dub	
2023	Like a Dragon Gaiden: The Man Who Erased His Name	Boss	English dub	
2023	Granblue Fantasy Versus: Rising	Vaseraga, Imperial Soldier	English dub	
2024	Like a Dragon: Infinite Wealth	Additional voices	English dub	
2024	Granblue Fantasy: Relink	Vaseraga	English dub	
2024	Unicorn Overlord	Great Sage of Albion, Mercenaries (Type E), additional voices	English dub	
2024	The Legend of Heroes: Trails Through Daybreak	Geraint Reigar, citizens	English dub	
2024	Card-en-Ciel	Inferdin, Lux, Galak, Dwarf, Richard	English dub	
2024	Vampire Survivors	Richter Belmont, Death	Ode to Castlevania DLC	
2024	Ys X: Nordics	Grimson Balta	English dub	
2025	The Legend of Heroes: Trails Through Daybreak II	Geraint Reigar, White Demon Lord, HoloCore	English dub	
2025	Avowed	Additional voices		
2025	Like a Dragon: Pirate Yakuza in Hawaii	Additional voices	English dub	
2025	Date Everything!	Doug, Gerald Dabrowski		
2025	Death Stranding 2: On the Beach	The Phantom Smith	English dub	
2025	No Sleep for Kaname Date – From AI: The Somnium Files	Gen Ishiyagane	English dub	
2025	Story of Seasons: Grand Bazaar	Player C, Matsuba	English dub	
2025	Shinobi: Art of Vengeance	Lord Ruse	English dub	
2025	The Outer Worlds 2	Head Refresher Gould, Vice President Willard Konnen, Mads Parminter		
2025	Hyrule Warriors: Age of Imprisonment	Calamo	English dub	
2026	The Legend of Heroes: Trails Beyond the Horizon	Additional voices	English dub	
2026	Cookie Run: Kingdom	Abby Cookie	English dub	
2026	Marvel Tokon: Fighting Souls	Victor von Doom / Doctor Doom, Doombot	English dub	
2026	Disney Speedstorm	Shan Yu		
2027	Pony Island 2: Panda Circus	King Yan		

== Awards and nominations ==
Year	Ceremony	Category	Work/Recipient	Result	Refs
2017	Shorty Awards	Vine of the Year	"When You're the Main Character Tho"	Nominated	
2018	Streamy Awards	Acting in a Comedy	Anime Crimes Division	Nominated	
2023	Crunchyroll Anime Awards	Best Voice Artist Performance (English)	Kage (Ranking of Kings)	Nominated	
2025	Crunchyroll Anime Awards	Best Voice Artist Performance (English)	Senshi (Delicious in Dungeon)	Nominated	
