= Cástulo Guerra =

Argentine actor (born 1945)

Castulo Guerra
- Born: August 24, 1945 (age 80); Salta, Argentina
- Occupation: Actor
- Years active: 1976–present
- Spouse: Christy Claire Risska (m. 1972)
- Children: 2

Cástulo Guerra (born August 24, 1945) is an Argentine actor who has appeared in several American films and television shows.

He has appeared in the films Terminator 2,The Usual Suspects (1995), The Mexican (2001) and The Purge: Anarchy (2014).

== Early life ==
At the Teatro Universitario de Tucumán, he was cast in the role of The Player in a production of Rosencrantz and Guildenstern Are Dead, which traveled to the Teatro Cervantes in Buenos Aires in 1971.

== Career ==
Film roles include Terminator 2: Judgment Day, Cold Heaven, The Usual Suspects, Meet Me in Miami, Where the River Runs Black, The Mexican, The Celestine Prophecy, and Beverly Hills Chihuahua 2. His TV credits include: Riptide, The Fall Guy, Falcon Crest, The A-Team, Remington Steele, L.A. Law, Star Trek: The Next Generation, 21 Jump Street, Lois and Clark: The New Adventures of Superman, Brimstone, Nash Bridges, The Agency, ER, Alias, CSI: Miami, The West Wing, Prison Break and Numbers. He is also Samir Duran in StarCraft and Raphael Castillo in Santa Barbara.

He has provided the voice of General Suarez in the animated television series Deathstroke: Knights & Dragons.

== Personal life ==
On December 15, 1972, he married production manager Christy Claire Risska. They have two children, Clarity and Ian.

== Filmography ==
=== Film ===
Year	Title	Role	Notes
1983	Two of a Kind	Gonzales	
1985	Stick	Nestor	
1986	Just Between Friends	Sportscaster	
1986	A Fine Mess	Italian Director	
1986	Where the River Runs Black	Orlando Santos	
1987	Nuts	Dr. Arantes	
1988	Sunset	Pancho	
1991	Cold Heaven	Dr. DeMencos	
1991	Terminator 2: Judgment Day	Enrique Salceda	
1993	The Pickle	Jose Martinez	
1995	The Usual Suspects	Arturro Marquez	
1995	Bodily Harm	Dr. Vasquez	
1996	Lawnmower Man 2: Beyond Cyberspace	Guillermo	
1997	Amistad	Spanish Priest	
1998	Runnioman	Father Talou	
1998	No Salida	Papi	
1999	Blink of an Eye	Father Chavez	
2001	Moonbeams	Dr. West	
2001	The Mexican	Joe the Pawnshop Owner	
2003	Scooby-Doo! and the Monster of Mexico	Señor Fuente (voice)	Direct-to-video
2004	The Alamo	General Manuel Fernández Castrillón	
2005	Meet Me in Miami	Miguel	
2006	The Celestine Prophecy	Father Jose	
2009	Spoken Word	Dr. Lopez	
2010	Our Family Wedding	Father Paez	
2010	Pete Smalls Is Dead	El Patron	
2011	Beverly Hills Chihuahua 2	Mr. Cortez	
2012	Undocumented	Coyote	
2012	Bless Me, Ultima	Tenorio	
2014	The Purge: Anarchy	Barney	
2017	The Aliens	Diego	
2019	Badur Hogar	Domingo Badur	

=== Television ===
Year	Title	Role	Notes
1986	The A Team	President Alexander Martien	Episode: "The Theory of Revolution"
1987	Right to Die	Dr. Reuben Espinoza	TV movie
1989	Star Trek: The Next Generation	Mendoza	Episode: "The Price"
1990	L.A. Law	Jaime Rodriguez	Episode: "Lie Harder"
1997	Superman: The Animated Series	NASA Spokesperson (voice)	Episode: "Solar Power"
2004	Duck Dodgers	Sergeant Vasquez (voice)	Episode: "The Mark of Xero"
2005	The West Wing	Eddie Garcia	Episode: "La Palabra"
2005–07	CSI: Miami	General Antonio Cruz	2 Episodes
2007–08	Prison Break	General Zavala	Season 3
2012–14	Dallas	Carlos Del Sol	4 episodes
2013	CSI: Crime Scene Investigation	Eddie Santos	Episode: "Exile"
2020	Deathstroke: Knights & Dragons	General Suarez, Doctor	Voice, Episode: "Knights & Dragons: Part One"
2020–21	All Rise	Miguel	3 episodes
2020	Onyx Equinox	Mictlantecuhtli / Huitzilopochtli / Master (voices)	3 episodes
2021	Station 19	Juan Carlos Garcia	Episode: "Forever and Ever, Amen"

=== Web series ===
Year	Title	Role	Notes
2020	Onyx Equinox	Mictlantecuhtli	

=== Video games ===
Year	Title	Role	Notes
1997	Herc's Adventures	Hades	
1998	StarCraft: Brood War	Samir Duran	
2000	Diablo II	Geglash	
2000	Sacrifice	Charnel	
2021	Diablo II: Resurrected	Geglash	
