= Gene-X =

2006 Australian feature film

- Directed by: Martin Simpson
- Written by: Martin Simpson
- Produced by: Tony Chu; Martin Simpson; Irene Walls
- Starring: Ayşe Tezel; Patrick Magee; Peter Astridge
- Cinematography: Vincent Monton
- Edited by: Richard Hindley
- Music by: Tony Flint
- Release date: 2006
- Running time: 85 minutes
- Country: Australia
- Language: English

Gene-X is an independent Australian feature film, released in the latter half of 2006. It is directed and written by Martin Simpson and stars Ayşe Tezel, Patrick Magee and Peter Astridge.

== Plot summary ==
A young research doctor named Tom Gray is on the verge of a genetic cure for cancer. Nurse Casey Gordon is desperate to save the life of a child in her care and seduces Tom into testing his therapy. Early success brings romance into Tom's life for the first time, but Casey has a secret lover whose jealous anger puts their lives in danger, and Tom finds his cure has a dark side.

== Cast ==
Actor	Character
Patrick Magee	Dr. Tom Gray
Ayşe Tezel	Nurse Casey Gordon
Peter Astridge	Karl Magnusson
Gerry Sont	Professor White

== Production ==
Principal photography was in Sydney between 31 May 2005 and 8 July 2005. Picture lock-off was reached in early February 2006 and post production was completed in September 2006.

== Premiere ==
Gene-X premiered at the London Australian Film Festival in 2007.
