= Meet Me in Miami =

2005 New Zealand feature film

- Directed by: Eric Hannah; Iren Koster
- Written by: Tracey Silvers; Iren Koster
- Produced by: Lisa Abbot
- Starring: Carlos Ponce; Eduardo Verástegui; Tara Leniston; Ayşe Tezel
- Release date: 29 October 2005 (Los Angeles Latino Film Festival)
- Running time: 94 minutes
- Country: New Zealand
- Language: English

Meet Me in Miami is a 2005 New Zealand film directed by Eric Hannah and Iren Koster and starring Carlos Ponce, Tara Leniston, Eduardo Verastegui, and Ayşe Tezel. The film received positive reviews despite its limited release.

== Plot ==
Luis was 12 when he met Julia. She was staying at the hotel with her family while on holiday, and when the two met, the connection was instant. They spent the summer together, laughing, playing and wishing it would never end. When it was finally time for Julia to return to her native New Zealand, the two made a promise to meet back at the fountain the same time every year. Each year Luis waited, but no Julia.

Now 10 years later, Luis finally decides it's time to put destiny to the test. Dragging along his best friend Eduardo, they board a plane to New Zealand determined to find Julia and win her back.

== Cast ==
Actor	Role
Tara Leniston	Julia
Carlos Ponce	Luis
Eduardo Verástegui	Eduardo
Ayşe Tezel	Annie
Castulo Guerra	Miguel
Richard Yniguez	Julio
Katherine Hawkes	Angel
Steve Wilcox	
Kamala Lopez	Marta
Sarah Thomson	Jennifer
