= Ayşe Tezel =

Turkish British actress (born 1980)

- Born: 19 September 1980 (age 45); London, England
- Occupation: Actress
- Years active: 2002–present

Ayşe Tezel (born 19 September 1980) is a New Zealand content creator, voice over artist & actress who made her debut in two episodes of the New Zealand television show Shortland Street in April 2002. She has acted in a number of television series and feature films shot in New Zealand, the UK and Australia, where she may be best known for her roles in 'Spartacus', 'Sione's 2 Unfinished Business', Meet Me in Miami (2005) and Court of Lonely Royals (2007). After a five-year absence from film and television, she appeared in two episodes of Shortland Street in July 2021, as a different character from her 2002 appearance.

== Biography ==
Tezel was born in London. She took her first ballet lesson when she was three years old and enrolled in a repertory theatre when she was eight.

Tezel relocated to Sydney, Australia in 2004 and landed leading roles in the feature films Gene-X and Court of Lonely Royals. She has since returned to London to study Method Acting and has completed work on the feature film London Thing along with the internet series Conquering Demons, Manhattan Money and various short films.

== Voice acting ==
Tezel has been involved in voice acting for numerous commercials including OK! Magazine, Path of Exile, The Beverly Hills Hotel, Sheilas' Wheels, Barclays Bank and Air New Zealand.

== Filmography ==
=== Film ===
| Year | Title | Role | Notes |
|---|---|---|---|
| 2005 | Wong Cha Cha | Ana Tirana | Short film |
| 2005 | Meet Me in Miami | Annie | |
| 2006 | Gene-X | Casey Gordon | |
| 2006 | Court of Lonely Royals | Hunter Thompson | |
| 2010 | Other Side of the Game | Claudia Cohen | |
| 2012 | Sione's 2: Unfinished Business | Maria | |
| 2013 | Black Dog | Victoria | Short film |

=== Television ===
| Year | Title | Role | Notes |
|---|---|---|---|
| 2002 | Shortland Street | Melody Goodall | 2 episodes |
| 2012 | Go Girls | Bex Boskovich | "Consequences", "Two Trolls" |
| 2012 | Emilie Richards – Spuren der Vergangenheit | Kristin | TV film |
| 2012 | Path of Exile | The Scion (voice) | Video game |
| 2013 | Spartacus: War of the Damned | Canthara | "Spoils of War", "Mors Indecepta" |
| 2013 | The Blue Rose | Hannah Dobson | "The Night Has Opened My Eyes", "Girl Afraid", "Hand in Glove" |
| 2013 | Nothing Trivial | Aphrodelle Presenter | "Around 100 New Zealanders Do What Every Day?" |
| 2021 | Shortland Street | Rebecca Hula | 2 episodes |
