= The Anime Effect =

Podcast

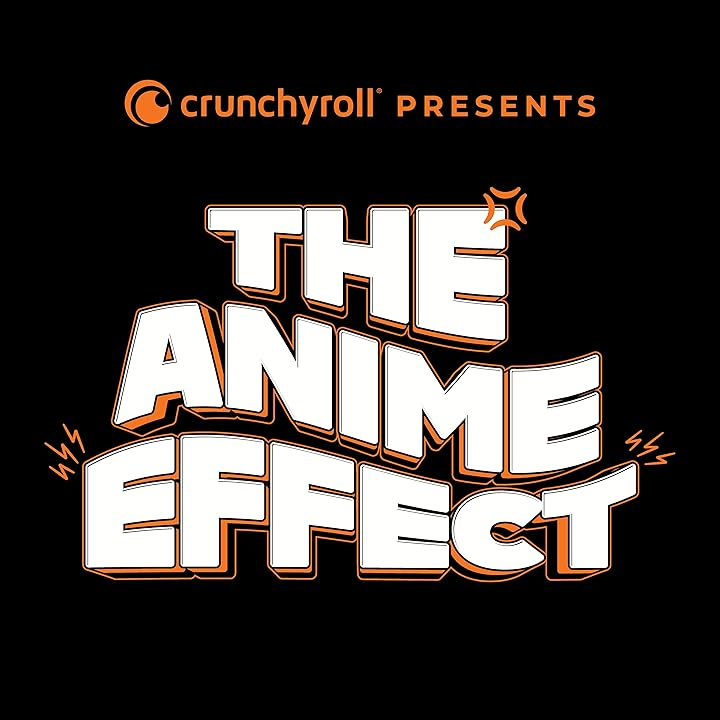
- Genre: Anime and manga fandom; Japanese popular culture
- Format: Audio/Video
- Country of origin: United States
- Language: English

Creative team
- Created by: Nicholas Friedman
- Developed by: Crunchyroll, LLC; Sony Music Entertainment
- Written by: Megan Peters, Carla Solorzano

Cast and voices
- Hosted by: Nicholas Friedman; LeAlec Murray; Leah President

Production
- Camera: Shaun Michael Colon
- Production: Crunchyroll; Sony Music Entertainment
- Editing: Shaun Michael Colon
- Length: 45-60 minutes

Technical specifications
- Video format: YouTube; Crunchyroll
- Audio format: MP3

Publication
- No. of seasons: 3
- No. of episodes: 114
- Original release: February 16, 2024
- Updates: 1-2 episodes weekly

Related
- Related shows: The Gachiakuta After Show, Witch Chat: The Official Witch Hat Atelier Companion Podcast
- Website: www.crunchyroll.com/series/G4PH0WJPQ

The Anime Effect is a weekly audio and video podcast by Crunchyroll, LLC and originally produced in collaboration with Sony Music Entertainment. It is hosted by Crunchyroll employees Nicholas Friedman, Director of Audience Development Multimedia and Editorial; LeAlec Murray, Brand Manager; and Leah President, Audience Development Multimedia Manager. The series' showrunner is Megan Peters and its marketing producer is Carla Solorzano. Shaun Michael Colon is the show's audio / visual director.

== Background ==
The COO of Crunchyroll, Gita Rebbapragada described the project as a "natural extension of our current Crunchyroll News program and a place where fans can dive deeper into everything anime and celebrate it regardless of what platform or service it is on." Starting February 16, 2024, this podcasts hosts on every Friday as a video format on YouTube and Crunchyroll apps and website as well as audio format on Apple Podcasts, Spotify and other platforms.

The series has included a slew of notable guests, including LiSA, Mori Calliope, Big Sean, Aleks Le, Matthew Mercer, Atsushi Kaneko, Hiro Mashima, and Yasuhiro Nightow. From longform interviews to fan-centric Q&As, The Anime Effect is Crunchyroll's flagship podcast for every kind of anime fan. The series has also spawned two spin-off video podcasts: The Gachiakuta After Show and Witch Chat: The Official Witch Hat Atelier Companion Podcast.

The Anime Effect has won numerous awards and nominations, including:

- 17th Annual Shorty Awards: Audience Honor in Arts & Culture Podcast
- 18th Annual Shorty Awards: Silver Honor in Arts & Culture Podcast
- Signal Awards: Gold, Best Co-Host Team (Pop Culture)
- Digiday Media Awards: Best Video Podcast

== Notable Episodes ==
The Anime Effect's most notable episodes often include major guest stars and longform interviews. You can find a list of these episodes below:

- Special: "What's Next for Solo Leveling? The Anime's Team Weighs In from CCXP Mexico '25"
- Episode 77: "How Gachiakuta Turned Trash Into Manga's Greatest Treasure (ft. Kei Urana & Hideyoshi Andou)"
- Episode 86: "Olympic Champion Noah Lyles Will Never Leave His Fave Anime in the Dust"
- Episode 94: "Amber Glenn's Dream Anime Pitch Is Gold Medal Material"
- Episode 96: "Joining the TRIGUN STARGAZE Hype Train with Creator Yasuhiro Nightow"
- Episode 98: "BABYMETAL's Origin Story Would Make the Ultimate Anime (ft. BABYMETAL)"
- Episode 102: "WNBA Star Gabby Williams Takes Over the Show With Her Anime Dream Team"
- Episode 103: "Pokémon's Veronica Taylor On Becoming Ash Ketchum & Finding Your Voice"
- Episode 114: "Big Sean Talks Dragon Ball, His Best Bars, and the Anime That Made Him a Rapper"
