= Tara Leniston =

Irish actress (born 1983)

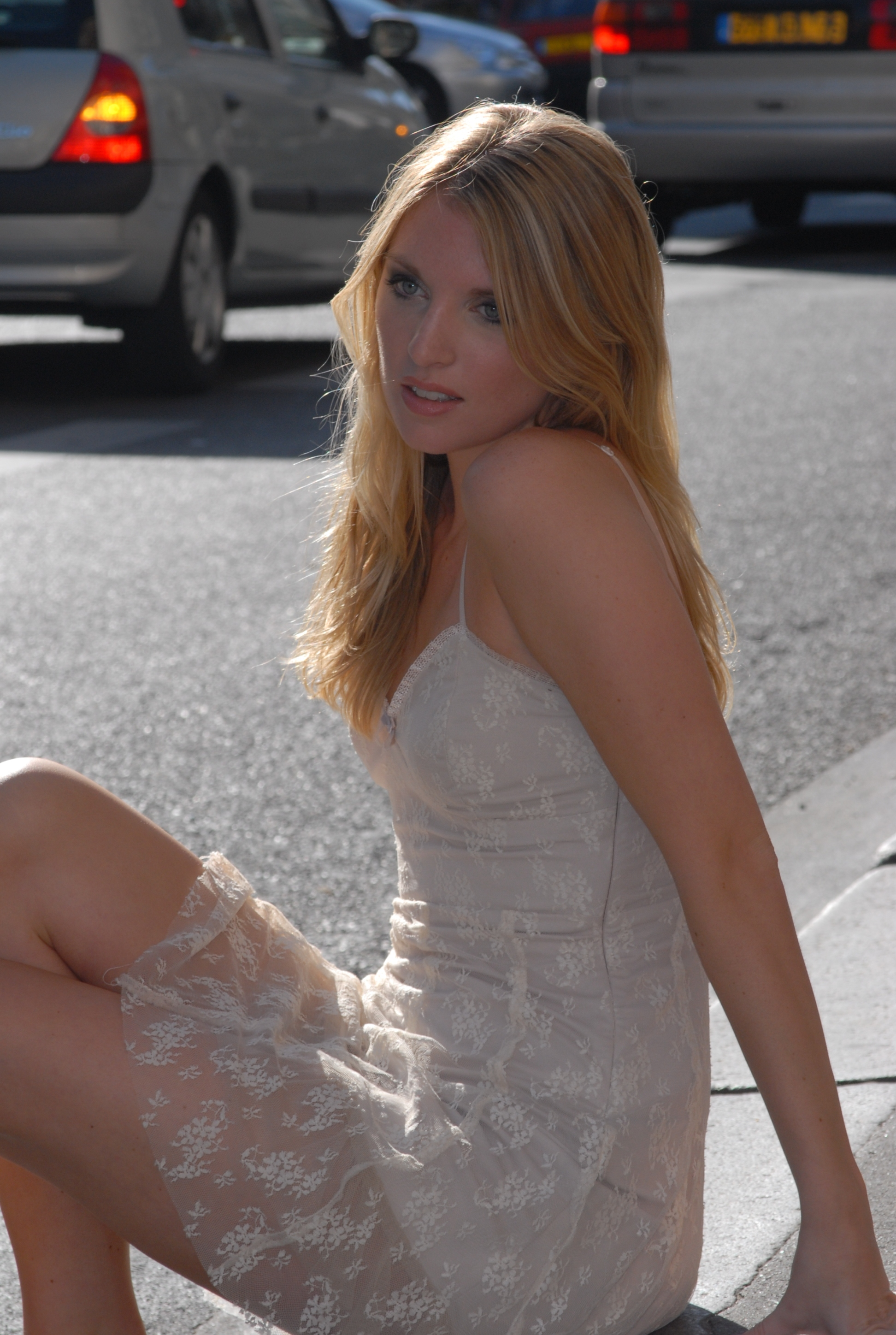
- Born: Tara Louise Leniston; 1 May 1983 (age 42); Crawley, England
- Occupation: actress

Tara Louise Leniston (born 1 May 1983) is an Irish actress. She was born in England, grew up in County Clare, Ireland and has also lived in Korea, Sweden, and Hong Kong. She travelled abroad with her father Greg, who was a senior manager with Baltimore Technologies.

In 1995, Leniston started her acting career while living in Seoul, appearing in Whats up Doogie, a Korean kids TV program. A year later, the family moved to London, where Leniston attended The Arts Educational School and she studied Drama for two years.

After her studies were completed, Leniston moved to Hong Kong with her family and worked as a TV presenter for MTV's Channel V. She met Jackie Chan in Hong Kong. She went on to be the first western female to be trained and signed by the Jackie Chan group, set up by Jackie Chan for people he thinks have exceptional talent. Her affiliation with the group led to a part in Jackie Chan's film The Medallion.

In 2003, Leniston moved to New Zealand to star in her first motion picture, Meet Me in Miami, alongside Latin actors Carlos Ponce and Eduardo Verastegui. The premier of Meet me in Miami in Houston in the 2006 summer was part of the Giving Hope tour in aid of victims of Hurricane Katrina.

She has also been involved in a number of short films, commercials and modelling campaigns for brands including Ralph Lauren, The North Face, and Loreal hair care.

Leniston will be the female lead and co-producer in Irish film Danny Boy.

Her sister Sophie Leniston was in a girlgroup called "City Girls". They released an album and two singles.
