= FreakAngels =

British post-apocalyptic webcomic

- FreakAngels promo ad, artist Paul Duffield
- Author(s): Warren Ellis (writer); Paul Duffield (artist)
- Website: www.freakangels.com
- Current status/schedule: Ended
- Launch date: 15 February 2008
- End date: 5 August 2011
- Publisher: Avatar Press
- Genre: steampunk

FreakAngels is a British post-apocalyptic webcomic created in 2008 by Eagle Award-winning writer Warren Ellis and artist Paul Duffield, and published in book format by Avatar Press. The plot focuses on twelve 23-year-old psychics living in Whitechapel six years after civilization in Great Britain is destroyed. The webcomic has received various awards and has been collected in a series of six volumes.

Crunchyroll adapted the webcomic into an animated series in January 2022.

== Publication history ==
Warren Ellis announced the project at the 2007 San Diego Comic-Con with the statement: "I've written two hundred pages and I still have no idea what it's about… it's retro-punk, it's near future steampunk" It was launched on 15 February 2008. New installments were released in six full-colour page episodes every week, a schedule that allows the story the chance to grow naturally.

The story grew out of Ellis' question as to what would have happened if the Midwich Cuckoos had survived and grown to "disaffected and confused twenty-one-year-olds." The story builds on the legacy of John Wyndham's style of disaster fiction.

The series ran for 144 episodes, completing on Friday 5 August 2011. Duffield eventually moved on to his own webcomic project, The Firelight Isle.

== Synopsis ==
Ellis' synopsis of the plot involves characters "living in a post-flood London that they might possibly have had something to do with." The so-called FreakAngels, who possess telepathy and many other "special" abilities, such as space-time manipulation/distortion, and pyrokinesis, live in Whitechapel.

As the story progresses, eleven of the FreakAngels are introduced and their role in the community is expanded. For the most part cooperatively they have created a small community of roughly three hundred people with fresh water, watch towers, markets, home-grown vegetables and a medical clinic. Their society is threatened, however, externally from refugee attacks and internally from personal conflicts and crime.

== Reception ==
Brian Warmoth of MTV News stated that FreakAngels works well because of the combination of the steampunk-styled imaginative prop design and the bleak, post-apocalyptic setting, as well as a well thought-out underlying mystery. However, Warmoth noted the ongoing nature of the comic being detrimental, as the big reveals hadn't happened yet during the review in 2009.

Larry Cruz from Comix Talk praised FreakAngels' "subversive style of grittiness" and described the comic's dialogue as "a cut above prose you’d find in most novels." Characterizing the webcomic as "anti-steampunk", Cruz argued that went against steampunk tropes by setting the story in a post-apocalyptic setting rather than in an "age of science." Cruz stated that Ellis' high reputation as a writer is well deserved, as he "pours his heart and soul into FreakAngels". Critics have also argued that the cavalier treatment of psychological horror and sexual abuse inflicted on some characters is not consistent with the tone or aesthetic of the sometimes "silly and mundane" weekly web comic.

=== Awards ===
FreakAngels has won various awards:

- Won "Favourite Web-Based Comic" Eagle Award in 2010.
- Nominated for "Best Comic/Graphic Novel" British Fantasy Award in 2010.
- Won "Favourite Web-Based Comic" Eagle Award in 2012.

== Collected editions ==
The series has been collected into trade paperbacks:

- Volume 1 (144 pages, November 2008, hardcover, ISBN 1-59291-057-2, softcover, ISBN 1-59291-056-4)
- Volume 2 (144 pages, May 2009, limited edition hardcover, ISBN 1-59291-072-6, softcover, ISBN 1-59291-071-8)
- Volume 3 (144 pages, November 2009, limited edition hardcover, ISBN 1-59291-078-5, softcover, ISBN 1-59291-079-3)
- Volume 4 (144 pages, June 2010, hardcover, ISBN 1-59291-095-5, softcover, ISBN 1-59291-094-7)
- Volume 5 (144 pages, January 2011, hardcover, ISBN 1-59291-116-1, softcover, ISBN 1-59291-115-3)
- Volume 6 (144 pages, November 2011, hardcover, ISBN 1-59291-134-X, softcover, ISBN 1-59291-133-1)

== Animated series ==
Crunchyroll Studios produced a 9-episode animated series based on the webcomic which was released on January 27, 2022.
