= Crunchyroll =

American video streaming service

- Crunchyroll's logo used since July 2024 (Note: The logo's eye symbol, which has been in use since 2012, was slightly adjusted, while the wordmark was rendered in a new typeface.)
- Company type: Subsidiary
- Website type: OTT platform
- Available in: 22 languages
- List of languages: Arabic; Catalan; Chinese; English; Filipino; French; German; Hindi; Indonesian; Italian; Japanese; Korean; Malay; Polish; Portuguese; Russian; Spanish; Tamil; Telugu; Thai; Turkish; Vietnamese
- Headquarters: San Francisco, California, U.S.
- Country of origin: United States
- Area served: Worldwide
- Founders: Kun Gao; James Lin; Brandon Ooi; Vu Nguyen
- Industry: Entertainment; mass media
- Products: Streaming television; video on demand; digital distribution
- Services: Film production; film distribution; television production; television distribution
- Parent: Crunchyroll, LLC (Note: Crunchyroll, LLC operates but does not directly own the brand's namesake OTT streaming platform. Instead, both the company and service are owned by a joint venture between Sony Pictures Entertainment and Sony Music Entertainment Japan (through Aniplex).)
- Website: www.crunchyroll.com
- IPv6 support: Yes
- Commercial: Yes
- Registration: Required
- Users: ▲21 million (as of May 8, 2026)
- Launched: May 14, 2006; 20 years ago
- Current status: Active

Crunchyroll is an American subscription video on-demand over-the-top streaming television service owned by the Sony Group Corporation. The service primarily distributes Japanese anime television series and films, as well as other East Asian media, and also hosts anime content from other providers, content add-ons, live events, music, video games, and video channels.

Launched in May 2006, the service offers more than 1,000 anime series, more than 200 East Asian dramas in more than 18 languages, and formerly offered around 80 manga titles through its Crunchyroll Manga anthology, although the number of available titles varied by country due to licensing restrictions. Crunchyroll is one of the most-subscribed video on demand streaming media services globally, with 21 million subscriptions as of 2026.

Crunchyroll is a member of The Association of Japanese Animations (AJA). "Crunchyroll Hime", also known as "Hime", has been the official mascot of Crunchyroll since June 2013.

== History ==
The original Crunchyroll logo used from 2006 to 2012, with the logo possibly resembling sushi

=== Origins and informal distribution ===
Crunchyroll was launched on May 14, 2006, as a pirate site that specialized in hosting East Asian content. It was founded by Kun Gao, James Lin, Vu Nguyen, and Brandon Ooi, four computer science graduates at the University of California, Berkeley. Some of the content hosted on this platform included versions of East Asian shows that had been subtitled by fans.

In 2008, Crunchyroll secured a capital investment of $4.05 million from the venture capital firm Venrock. The investment drew criticism from anime distributors and licensors Bandai Entertainment and Funimation as the site continued to allow users to upload unlicensed copies of copyrighted titles.

=== Move to legal distribution ===
Logo used from 2012 to 2018. The logo was simplified while the eye symbol was introduced, replacing the sushi symbol.

Crunchyroll eventually began securing legal distribution agreements with companies, including Gonzo, for a growing list of titles. On January 8, 2009, after announcing a deal with TV Tokyo to host episodes of Naruto Shippuden, Crunchyroll stated that it was committed to removing all copyright-infringing material from its site and to only hosting content to which it had legitimate distribution rights.

In 2010, Crunchyroll announced its acquisition of the North American DVD rights to 5 Centimeters Per Second. This was the first DVD release licensed by Crunchyroll.

On October 30, 2013, Crunchyroll began digitally distributing 12 different manga titles from Kodansha through Crunchyroll Manga, including Attack on Titan and Fairy Tail.

=== AT&T/Chernin Group ownership ===
On December 2, The Chernin Group, an independent media holding company, announced that it had acquired a controlling interest in Crunchyroll for a reported $100 million. The Chernin Group said that Crunchyroll management and existing investor TV Tokyo would maintain a "significant" stake in the company.

On April 22, 2014, AT&T and The Chernin Group announced the formation of a joint venture to acquire, invest in, and launch over-the-top (OTT) video services. Both companies committed more than $500 million in funding to the venture. The new company was named Otter Media and became the majority owner of Crunchyroll. On August 3, 2015, Variety reported that Otter Media would unveil Ellation, a new umbrella company for its subscription-based video services, including Crunchyroll. Ellation's services included VRV, which debuted in 2016, a video streaming platform described as targeting "geeks, gamers and lovers of comedy, fantasy and technology."

On October 22, Anime News Network reported that Crunchyroll had achieved 700,000 paying subscribers. In addition, the company announced that they and Sumitomo Corporation had created a joint venture to produce and invest in anime productions.

On April 11, 2016, Crunchyroll and Kadokawa Corporation announced the formation of a strategic alliance that gave Crunchyroll exclusive worldwide digital distribution rights (excluding Asia) for Kadokawa anime titles in the upcoming year. It also granted Crunchyroll the right to co-finance Kadokawa anime titles to be produced in the future.

=== Funimation partnership, and home video expansion ===
On July 1, Crunchyroll announced plans to dub and release a number of series on home video. On September 8, Crunchyroll announced a partnership with Funimation. Crunchyroll would stream select Funimation titles, while Funimation would stream select Crunchyroll titles as well as their upcoming dubbed content. In addition, Funimation would act as the distributor for Crunchyroll's home video catalog.

On February 9, 2017, Crunchyroll announced that it had reached one million paid subscribers. On March 22, Kun Gao took over as representative director of its Japanese branch, succeeding Vincent Shortino. On March 30, Crunchyroll began to distribute anime through Steam. On November 4, a group of hackers managed to hijack the official site for almost six hours. Users were redirected to a fake lookalike site that prompted them to download ransomware under the guise of "CrunchyViewer". Crunchyroll filed a first information report against the hackers. On July 18, Crunchyroll began collaborating with the video-streaming platform Twitch.

=== AT&T/WarnerMedia ownership and internal productions ===
Logo used from 2018 to 2024. The text color was changed from gray to orange to match the symbol color while the shade of orange was made slightly darker.

In January 2018, Otter Media bought the remaining shares (20%) of Crunchyroll from TV Tokyo and other investors. In August 2018, AT&T acquired the remainder of Otter Media that it did not already own from The Chernin Group; the company and Crunchyroll were folded under WarnerMedia, formerly Time Warner, which AT&T had also recently acquired. In August 2018, the service announced an expansion into original content with the anime-inspired series High Guardian Spice, produced by Ellation Studios. On October 18, Funimation announced that their partnership with Crunchyroll ended as a result of Sony Pictures Television's acquisition of Funimation and AT&T's acquisition of Crunchyroll's parent company, Otter Media.

On March 4, 2019, it was announced that Otter Media would be placed under Warner Bros. as part of their reorganization efforts. As a result of said reorganization, the company and Crunchyroll became corporate sisters to the American cable channel Cartoon Network and its nighttime programming block Adult Swim, which broadcast anime under the Toonami brand. Due to a subsequent reorganization, Crunchyroll was moved under WarnerMedia Entertainment, owner of networks such as TBS and TNT, in May 2019 so that Tony Goncalves, CEO of Otter Media, could oversee the development of its forthcoming streaming service.

On July 3, Crunchyroll announced that they had partnered with Viz Media to distribute select Crunchyroll-licensed titles on home video and electronic sell-through in the United States and Canada. In Summer 2019, independent Australian production company Glitch Productions announced that they had partnered with Crunchyroll to produce their YouTube original series, Meta Runner. On September 6, Crunchyroll announced that they had become the majority investor in Viz Media Europe. Crunchyroll solidified this deal on December 4, becoming the majority owners of Viz Media Europe Group and appointing former Viz Media Europe president John Easum as Head. It was later rebranded as Crunchyroll EMEA, with former Viz Media Europe brands becoming Crunchyroll brands.

On October 15, it was announced that Naver Corporation's webtoon publishing portal, WEBTOON, was partnering with Crunchyroll to produce animated adaptations of its series. On February 25, 2020, Crunchyroll announced a slate of several programs under their new "Crunchyroll Originals" brand, including anime adaptations of the webtoons Tower of God, The God of High School, and Noblesse.

On September 5, Crunchyroll announced that they had entered into a partnership with Sentai Filmworks to distribute Crunchyroll licensed titles onto home video and electronic sell-through, with Granbelm, Food Wars!: Shokugeki no Soma: The Fourth Plate, Ascendance of a Bookworm, and World Trigger being the first titles distributed through the partnership.

=== Sony ownership ===
On August 12, 2020, The Information reported that Sony, Funimation's parent company, was in talks to acquire Crunchyroll from WarnerMedia for $1.5 billion. According to Variety, the amount was decreased to $1 billion. Later in October 2020, it was reported that Sony was in its final talks with AT&T to acquire the streaming service for more than $950 million. On December 9, Sony announced that they had reached a deal with AT&T and WarnerMedia to acquire Crunchyroll for $1.175 billion. However, on March 24, 2021, it was reported that the United States Department of Justice had extended its antitrust review of the acquisition.

On August 9, Sony announced that it had completed its acquisition of Crunchyroll. Following the acquisition, Sony stated that they wanted to create a unified anime subscription experience using their existing anime businesses as soon as possible. Crunchyroll confirmed four days later that VRV was included in the acquisition. On September 23, Crunchyroll announced that they had entered into a partnership deal with Fuji TV for anime content development and production. The partners planned to start work on the new slate in April 2022 with anime-focused developer and producer Slow Curve.

On March 1, 2022, it was announced that the Funimation, Wakanim, and VRV SVOD services would be consolidated into Crunchyroll. Additionally, Funimation Global Group, LLC rebranded as Crunchyroll, LLC. On the same day, Crunchyroll began adding new anime titles, including Hindi or Indian English subs and dubs for India. In the wake of the Russian military invasion of Ukraine, Crunchyroll and Wakanim announced that they would suspend their services in Russia as of March 11. Its parent company, Sony, donated $2 million in humanitarian aid to Ukraine.

On March 24, Crunchyroll announced that starting with the Spring 2022 season, a subscription would be required to watch new and continued simulcasts, with older titles featured on the site prior to this season remaining free to watch. It was also announced that the first three episodes of select titles would be free a week after their premiere until May 31.

On April 5, the company announced that Funimation's YouTube channel had been rebranded as Crunchyroll Dubs and that it would serve as Crunchyroll's channel for English-dubbed content, while English-subtitled content would continue to be uploaded on their Crunchyroll Collection channel. The company also stated that they would release an English-dubbed first episode of an anime series every Saturday at 3:00 p.m. ET on the Crunchyroll Dubs YouTube channel, starting with Re:Zero − Starting Life in Another World on April 9. Three days later, Crunchyroll announced that the Funimation Shop would be moved to the Crunchyroll Store. On November 2, Crunchyroll collaborated with the instant messaging social platform Discord. The integration allows Crunchyroll users to link their accounts and display the movie or show they are currently watching on their Discord profile.

On March 1, 2023, it was reported Crunchyroll received a dedicated button on new Sony Bravia TVs remotes. A couple days later, Crunchyroll launched a feature where users with subscriptions could watch J-pop and anime music videos and live concerts on the site. It primarily features artists from Sony Music Japan.

On May 15, Crunchyroll partnered with the language learning app Duolingo to help users learn Japanese while watching anime.

On October 6, Senior Vice President of global creative marketing Markus Gerdemann stated that some of Crunchyroll's fastest-growing markets outside the United States were Brazil, France, Germany and Mexico, and more than 800 million people were interested in anime worldwide.

On February 16, 2024, Crunchyroll launched its official weekly podcast Crunchyroll Presents: The Anime Effect on all major audio streaming platforms made to discuss anime and its impact on worldwide popular culture. Throughout February 2024, Crunchyroll launched its application for LG and Samsung smart TVs globally.

In February 2024, Crunchyroll president Rahul Purini said that relying on artificial intelligence to produce subtitles faster was "definitely an area where we are focused on". He said, "Right now, one of the areas we are very focused on testing is our subtitling and closed captioning, where we go from speech to text and how do we improve and optimize our processes where we can get the subtitles done in various languages across the world faster so that we can launch as close to the Japanese release as possible".

On July 8, Crunchyroll removed the comment section across all platforms, stating that it was done to "reduce harmful content", presumably in response to backlash from certain users being against Twilight Out of Focus. On the next day, Crunchyroll announced that its store would be available across 34 European countries. In mid-July, Crunchyroll unveiled a new brand identity, among them a new logo and new graphics, which took effect one week later at San Diego Comic-Con 2024. The new logo was made using a slightly adjusted eye symbol, while the wordmark was rendered in a brand new typeface.

On August 15, Crunchyroll began rolling out the campaign on Crunchyroll official launch in Indonesia, complete with local subs and dubs in most of the newly added titles for the Southeast Asian regions including Indonesia. On August 19, Crunchyroll collaborated with Spotify by launching its themed and curated playlists within the Spotify's Anime Hub.

On December 7, Bloomberg reported that Crunchyroll was seeing its early lead in anime streaming come under threat from rising competition as rivals like Netflix, Hulu, and Amazon Prime Video continued to expand their anime catalogs, often taking away exclusive licensing deals.

On January 7, 2025, Crunchyroll announced during Sony Group Corporation's CES 2025 press conference that a new digital manga application would join the service as a premium add-on, launched on October 9. The app launched as a standalone, called Crunchyroll Manga, on iOS and Android with web browser support planned for the future. Crunchyroll Manga first launched in English in the United States and Canada, with other language options planned.

In April 2025, Purini told Forbes that Crunchyroll was "not considering AI in the creative process, including our voice actors."

In October 2025, Crunchyroll announced that it had partnered with Delta Air Lines to bring its catalog into the latter's in-flight entertainment system starting in November. It then announced a global collaboration with HoYoverse for an exclusive Honkai: Star Rail collab, which began on November 6 to coincide with the game's Version 3.7 update. During the collaboration, the HoYoFair program's commissioned Chimerric Park fan work event streamed exclusively on Crunchyroll.

In December 2025, it was reported that Crunchyroll was eliminating its free, ad-supported tier at the end of the month. Prior to said elimination, Crunchyroll had over 120 million registered users overall.

In August 2026, Crunchyroll announced another global collaboration with HoYoverse, this time for an exclusive Genshin Impact collaboration, which began on August 12 to coincide with the game's Version 7.0 update. Two months later in October 2026, Crunchyroll, along with Hayate and LINE Digital Frontier, announced a co-production partnership which focused on creating anime adaptations for an assortment of Webtoon titles, beginning with The Boxer, The Remarried Empress, and Teenage Mercenary.

== Programming ==
=== Original programming ===
On February 25, 2020, Crunchyroll initially announced seven series under its Crunchyroll Originals label. These are anime or other animated series that were either co-produced or directly produced by the company. While Crunchyroll has co-produced other anime titles, this list only includes those that Crunchyroll themselves officially placed under the label. Following Sony's acquisition of Crunchyroll, the brand was quietly discontinued alongside the closure of the in-house production studios.

Series released under the "Crunchyroll Originals" label included:

Title	First run start date	First run end date	Episodes	Notes	Animation studio
In/Spectre	January 11, 2020	March 28, 2020	12	Adaptation of novel series written by Kyo Shirodaira.	Brain's Base
Tower of God	April 1, 2020	June 24, 2020	13	Adaptation of webtoon by SIU.	Telecom Animation Film
The God of High School	July 6, 2020	September 28, 2020	13	Adaptation of webtoon by Yongje Park.	MAPPA
Gibiate	July 15, 2020	September 30, 2020	12	Original work created by Ryō Aoki.	Lunch Box; Studio Elle
Tonikawa: Over the Moon for You	October 3, 2020	December 19, 2020	12	Adaptation of manga by Kenjiro Hata.	Seven Arcs
Noblesse	October 7, 2020	December 30, 2020	13	Adaptation of webtoon written by Son Jeho and illustrated by Lee Kwangsu.	Production I.G
Onyx Equinox	November 21, 2020	December 26, 2020	12	Original work created by Sofia Alexander.	Crunchyroll Studios
So I'm A Spider, So What?	January 8, 2021	July 3, 2021	24	Adaptation of light novel series written by Okina Baba and illustrated by Tsukasa Kiryu.	Millepensee
Dr. Ramune Mysterious Disease Specialist	January 10, 2021	March 28, 2021	12	Adaptation of manga series written by Aho Toro.	Platinum Vision
Ex-Arm	January 11, 2021	March 29, 2021	12	Adaptation of manga written by HiRock and illustrated by Shinya Komi.	Visual Flight
Fena: Pirate Princess	August 15, 2021	October 24, 2021	12	Original work by Kazuto Nakazawa and Production I.G. Co-production with Adult Swim.	Production I.G
High Guardian Spice	October 26, 2021	October 26, 2021	12	Original work created by Raye Rodriguez.	Crunchyroll Studios
Blade Runner: Black Lotus	November 14, 2021	February 6, 2022	13	Original work based on the Blade Runner franchise. Co-production with Adult Swim.	Sola Digital Arts
FreakAngels	January 27, 2022	January 27, 2022	9	Adaptation of webcomic written by Warren Ellis and illustrated by Paul Duffield.	Crunchyroll Studios
Shenmue: The Animation	February 6, 2022	May 1, 2022	13	Adaptation of the Shenmue video game series by Yu Suzuki. Co-production with Adult Swim.	Telecom Animation Film
Meiji Gekken: 1874	January 14, 2024	March 24, 2024	10	Original work created by Tsukasa Sakurai and Naoki Tozuka. Produced under the working title Meiji Gekken: Sword and Gun.	Tsumugi Akita Animation Lab

=== Crunchyroll Channel ===
Crunchyroll Channel
- Type: FAST television channel
- Country: United States
- Broadcast area: Nationwide
- Headquarters: Dallas, Texas

Programming
- Language: English
- Picture format: 1080p HDTV (downscaled to letterboxed 480p for older programming)

Ownership
- Owner: Crunchyroll, LLC; Game Show Network, LLC
- Sister channels: Great Entertainment Television; Sony Movie Channel; Game Show Network; Game Show Central; Sony Cine

History
- Launched: October 11, 2023; 3 years ago

Availability

Streaming media
- The Roku Channel: Channel 363
- LG Channels: Channel 261
- Vizio WatchFree+: Channel 775
- Amazon Freevee: None
- Pluto TV: None

On October 10, 2023, Sony announced it would launch a Crunchyroll-branded free ad-supported streaming television (FAST) channel, commonly referred to as the Crunchyroll Channel, under a partnership between its Crunchyroll, LLC and Game Show Network, LLC divisions. (Note: Sony owns Crunchyroll, LLC and Game Show Network, LLC through different divisions of the company. Crunchyroll, LLC is owned by Sony Pictures Entertainment and Sony Music Entertainment Japan's Aniplex, while Game Show Network, LLC is owned by the Sony Pictures Television Game Shows division of Sony Pictures Television.)

The linear channel launched on October 11 for The Roku Channel, LG Channels, and Vizio WatchFree+ platforms. The channel later became available on Amazon Freevee on October 17 and on Pluto TV on February 5, 2024. The initial programming lineup featured English-dubbed versions of anime titles such as Horimiya, Ranking of Kings, Moriarty the Patriot, Psycho-Pass, Arifureta: From Commonplace to World's Strongest, Sugar Apple Fairy Tale, To Your Eternity, and Code Geass.

=== Crunchyroll Game Vault ===
In November 2023, Crunchyroll launched their Game Vault service, which provides subscribers to their higher Mega and Ultimate Fan tiers with access to premium anime-inspired mobile games on Android and iOS devices without ads or in-app purchases. The service is different to their publishing division Crunchyroll Games, which releases free-to-play titles based on popular anime properties.

Titles available exclusively on mobile through the service include River City Girls, Pikuniku, Crypt of the NecroDancer, and Shantae and the Seven Sirens. In 2026, Crunchyroll announced they would begin to develop original video games for release on the Game Vault service.

== Device support and service features ==
Crunchyroll is available worldwide (except for parts of Asia, Russia, and Belarus) and can be accessed via a web browser on PCs, while Crunchyroll apps are available on various platforms, including Blu-ray disc players, mobile devices such as iOS/iPadOS, Android, and Windows Phone, game consoles such as Xbox (Xbox One and Xbox Series X/S), PlayStation (4/5 and PlayStation Vita), and Nintendo (Nintendo Switch). It is also compatible with Windows and macOS operating systems for desktop and laptop devices. Additionally, it is available on Smart TVs made by LG, Samsung and Sony, as well as on media players such as Apple TV, Roku, Google Chromecast, Amazon Fire TV, Tizen OS, and Android TV and on external players including the Xiaomi Mi Box S and the Nvidia Shield TV, among others. In addition, virtual reality headsets running visionOS are also supported. Furthermore, it is available via Prime Video Channels in the U.S., Canada, Sweden and the U.K., followed by additional territories throughout 2024.

== The Anime Awards ==
The Crunchyroll Anime Awards are annual awards given to anime from the previous year. The awards were first held in January 2017. Crunchyroll selects twenty judges from diverse backgrounds, who then create a list of six nominees within each category. This list is then made available to the public, who votes online to choose the winners.

== Crunchyroll Expo ==
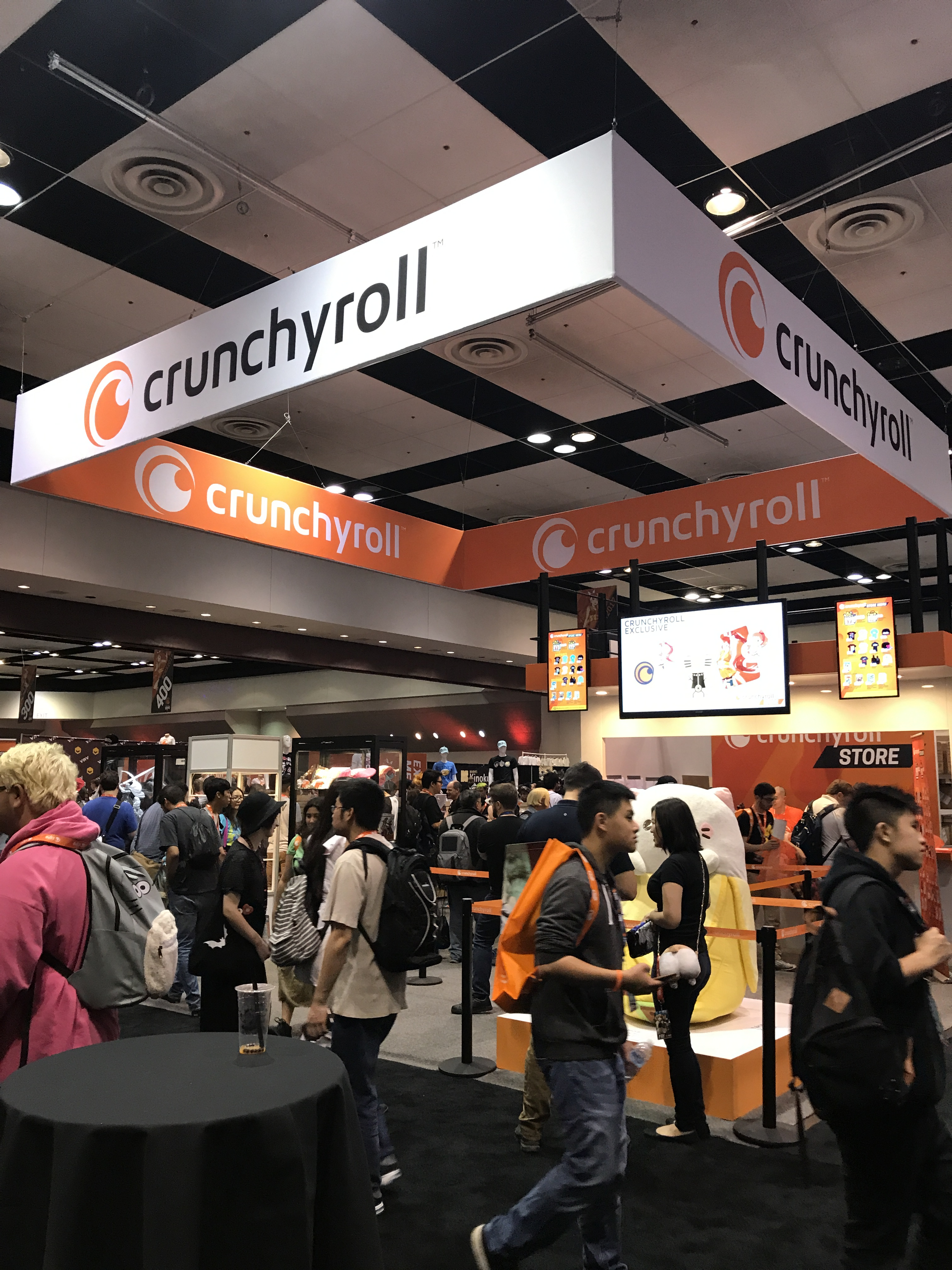
The Crunchyroll Store at Crunchyroll Expo 2017

Crunchyroll Expo (CRX) was an anime convention held annually in San Jose, California since 2017. Crunchyroll initially contracted LeftField Media to produce the convention, before partnering with ReedPop since 2020. Crunchyroll Expo 2019 premiered the movie Blackfox and the Mob Psycho 100 II original video animation, while Toei Animation organized a screening of the movies Dragon Ball Z: Bardock – The Father of Goku and Dragon Ball Z: Fusion Reborn. Conventions in 2020 and 2021 were held virtually due to the COVID-19 pandemic. Crunchyroll held an expo in Australia in 2022. On February 2, 2023, six months after announcing the dates and location, Crunchyroll revealed that its 2023 flagship event in San Jose would be cancelled in an effort to "focus on attending a growing roster of expos and festivals around the world".

== Reception ==
Crunchyroll has been generally well-received as a streaming service dedicated to anime. IGN highlighted its simulcast streams of new shows as they air in Japan. While PCMag was impressed by the selection of shows available, their reviewers felt that the user interface was too cluttered.

Crunchyroll Originals have been less well received. Callum May of Anime News Network outlined the production issues that Originals have faced, both for internal productions and U.S.-Japan co-productions.

== Controversies ==
=== Union busting allegations ===
Crunchyroll has been accused of union busting and other anti-union practices in its English dubbing work. After shifting to at-home recording during the COVID-19 pandemic, Crunchyroll announced a return to studio recording in May 2022. Following this shift, Crunchyroll began to primarily hire Texas-based actors to use their Texas studio. Since Texas is a right-to-work state, the Coalition of Dubbing Actors (CODA) alleged that this policy shift was an attempt to thwart union organization among dubbing actors and encouraged them to pressure Crunchyroll to sign a union contract with SAG-AFTRA.

In September 2022, Crunchyroll fired Kyle McCarley, a SAG-AFTRA member, from his role as the protagonist of Mob Psycho 100. Crunchyroll refused McCarley's offer to work on a non-union contract for the third season on the condition that Crunchyroll meet with SAG-AFTRA representatives to discuss potential future contracts.

In June 2023, Crunchyroll forbade the developers of the Tower of God: New World mobile game to cast the voice actors from the anime because the game production was covered by a union contract. The same month, voice actor Marin Miller alleged that the company used unenforceable contract clauses and was unwilling to provide job protections from artificial intelligence, and subsequently announced that they would no longer be working for dubs produced by the company.

=== Antitrust and monopoly ===
Since the Sony acquisition, the United States Department of Justice reviewed Sony's plan to combine Funimation and Crunchyroll into one service as a possible antitrust case. The Coalition of Dubbing Actors called the merged company a "chokepoint of power" in the dubbing industry. Comic Book Resources called the merger a monopoly and observed that it resulted in increased prices for existing Funimation customers, despite being available in fewer countries. In February 2024, Crunchyroll announced that it would not be honoring Funimation customers' digital purchases of anime, leading to a backlash.

=== Mail theft allegation ===
In October 2024, Crunchyroll was accused of mail theft by voice actor David Wald. According to Wald, for five years the company received fan mail meant for him and gave the items to staff instead. Crunchyroll stated that they did not intentionally open mail intended to others and were investigating the situation. A couple of weeks later, Wald announced he left his role as the English voice of Gajeel Redfox in Fairy Tail and he would not return to Crunchyroll's studio following the accusation.

=== Subtitling issues ===
In July 2025, Crunchyroll faced controversy when generative AI was used for the German and English subtitles of Necronomico and the Cosmic Horror Show. Company president Rahul Purini previously denied using artificial intelligence in its translations. A spokesperson for Crunchyroll later blamed the third-party vendor that provided the subtitles, acknowledging that the subtitles were AI generated. The company faced further backlash in October 2025 when their subtitles for the Fall 2025 anime season were either missing or featured different fonts among other issues.

=== Security issues ===
In March 2026, Crunchyroll was sued for violating the Video Privacy Protection Act (VPPA). According to the lawsuit, the company allegedly disclosed user information to a third-party marketing company without consent. They previously settled a similar lawsuit in 2023. In the same month, it was reported that Crunchyroll suffered a security breach via their outsourcing partner, Telus Digital. Crunchyroll was subsequently sued a few days later.

== See also ==
- List of anime distributed in the United States
- List of anime releases made concurrently in the United States and Japan
