= Skwigly =

British online magazine

- Editor-in chief: Ben Mitchell
- Editor: Steve Henderson
- Feature editor: Laura-Beth Cowley
- Categories: Visual arts
- Frequency: Daily
- Publisher: David R. Smith
- Founder: David R. Smith
- Founded: 12 April 2005
- Company: Skwigly Ltd.
- Based in: United Kingdom
- Language: English
- Website: www.skwigly.co.uk

Skwigly, also known as Skwigly Animation Magazine, is an independent British online magazine that focuses on animation, whether with interviews, reviews, videos, tutorials, news, or podcasts. In April 2005, it began its print run with 10,000 copies for £3.50 British Pounds at the newsstand.

This includes Hollywood movies and independent short films. In order to fund their publication, they appeal to advertisers for support and to their readers for donations. As of 2020, Ben Mitchell is the editor-in-chief, Steve Henderson is the editor, Aaron Wood is the managing director and writer, Laura-Beth Cowley is the features editor, and over 60 people are writers for the publication.

== Origins ==
In March 2000, the domain name for Swigly was first registered, as the magazine positioned themselves as a British Animation World Network, but they later, seemingly, went out of business sometime before October 2003, with the domain later used as a directory to animation links. By April 2004, the website had changed over to the Skwigly magazine, attempting to attract people of all types interested in animation. Later that year, an additional domain titled biganimation.com would be registered for those that could not remember the usual URL. Over a year later, in April 2005, the publication began its print run, with support from volunteers, sponsors and advertisers in the animation industry, while receiving funding from the Welsh Development Agency and printing done by a family-run press. At the time, Smith served as the publisher and founding editor, while Wade Konowalchuk was the editor, Amy Hodman was associate editor, and Giselle Fox was another associate editor, along with a number of other contributors. Also in 2005, Alan Titchmarsh and Tony Collingwood of Gordon the Garden Gnome were interviewed on the site.

== Later years ==
In the years that followed, the site reviewed animations like Chicken Little, talked about CGI techniques in The Polar Express, Max Fleischer, conducted various interviews, including one with Nicolas Menard of Loop Ring Chop Drink, and had articles about mentors in the animation industry. In 2014, the site ran a piece about how to "survive and thrive as a freelance animator." The following year, Skwigly announced the beginning of "a series of short film screenings" called This Is Not A Cartoon, in partnership with Flim Hub North Worst Central and the British Film Institute, alongside workshops and interviews. Then, in 2016, Steve Henderson, the editor of Skwigly, who was also the co-director of the Manchester Animation Festival, attended the Cardiff Independent Film Festival, and served as part of a jury for the CIFF Best Animation Award. In later years, from 2017 to 2019, Skwigly ran a quiz challenge to challenge those attending the Manchester Animation Festival on their "animation knowledge," giving out prizes for those who win. Also, in 2017, Steve Henderson of Skwigly contributed to Mark Collington's book, Animation in Context: A Practical Guide to Theory and Making by serving as an informal adviser on the content.

== Features ==
The site features interviews, reviews of books, events, and films. It also showcases various podcasts, tutorials, recent films, and events relating to animation. The publication additionally focuses on business in the animation industry, lists animation courses, lists what they argue are some of the best animated shorts, and focuses on independent animation. As such, The Etherington Brothers called the publication an "amazing resource" for those who are illustrators and animators, while others call it an important website for news about animation.
