= Animation Magazine =

American monthly magazine

- Editor: Ramin Zahed
- Categories: Animation
- Frequency: Monthly
- Publisher: Jean Thoren
- Founder: Terry Thoren
- Founded: August 1987; 39 years ago
- First issue: 1987
- Company: Animation Magazine, Inc.
- Country: United States
- Based in: Calabasas, California
- Language: American English
- Website: animationmagazine.net
- ISSN: 1041-617X
- OCLC: 46842821

Animation Magazine is an American print magazine and website covering the animation industry and education, as well as visual effects. The print magazine is published 10 times a year in the United States.

== History ==
Animation Magazine was founded in August 1987 by Terry Thoren, inspired by the success of the newspaper Animation News, which had been distributed over the previous six months to help promote Thoren's short-film compilations, Tournees of Animation. The print edition is published 10 times a year in the United States. Editorial covers all forms of animation: 2D animation, 3D for animation and visual effects, and stop-motion. A digital version www.animationmagazine.net was created in 2006. The company also publishes a daily weekday newsletter that covers the world of animation art, business and technology including software reviews.

== Profile ==
Animation Magazine Inc, publishes annual Tradeshow Calendars, A Career and Education guide and 5 special Oscar and Emmy awards issues throughout the year. Daily animation news is updated every weekday on the publication's website. Also featured on the site is AniMagTV, a portal dedicated to brief reports on animation events, shorts and trailers. Archives of early editions are available, along with digital and print subscriptions.

== See also ==
- Cartoon Brew
- Animation World Network
- History of animation
