= Kevin Temmer =

American animator and musician (born 1993)

- Born: January 5, 1993 (age 33); United States
- Education: Land O' Lakes High School; Ringling College of Art and Design (BA)
- Occupations: Animator; YouTuber; composer; singer-songwriter
- Years active: 2015–present
- Employers: Blue Sky Studios; Sony Interactive Entertainment; Jam City; Squanch Games; Glitch Productions (2023–present)

YouTube information
- Channel: @TemmerTunes
- Years active: 2020–present
- Subscribers: 1.02 million
- Views: 323 million
- Last updated: 25 April 2026

Kevin Temmer (born January 5, 1993) is an American animator, YouTuber, composer, and singer-songwriter. He is best known for his work as lead animator at Glitch Productions, contributing to the animated series The Amazing Digital Circus and Murder Drones.

Temmer was nominated for an Annie Award in 2024 for Best Character Animation – TV/Media for his work on the pilot episode of The Amazing Digital Circus.

== Early life and career ==
Temmer grew up in Land O' Lakes, Florida, where he first gained attention in animation as a teen. While completing the International Baccalaureate program at Land O' Lakes High School, he created a 15‑minute animated video promoting science fairs and science education that was featured on NASA's Science 360 site, the National Science Foundation knowledge network, and other educational platforms.

He also completed another IB project during high school, producing an original animated piece for his coursework, and went on to study computer animation at the Ringling College of Art and Design. There, Temmer completed his senior thesis film Aloha Hohe and graduated with a Bachelor of Arts degree in computer animation in 2014.

Temmer began his professional career working in feature film and video game animation with studios such as Blue Sky Studios, Sony Interactive Entertainment, Jam City, and Squanch Games. He later moved into internet animation, gaining recognition with independent animated music videos on his YouTube channel Kevin Temmer Tunes, which eventually led to his recruitment at Glitch Productions.

== Filmography ==
=== Film ===
| Year | Title | Role | Notes |
|---|---|---|---|
| 2014 | Aloha Hohe | Director / Writer / Producer / Voice actor / Animator / Composer | Student film |
| 2016 | Ice Age: Collision Course | Animator | Animation department |
| 2017 | Ferdinand | Animator | Animation department |
| 2019 | Spies in Disguise | Animator | Animation department |
| 2022 | The SpongeBob SquarePants Movie: Rehydrated | Animator | Animation department |

=== Television ===
| Years | Title | Role | Notes |
|---|---|---|---|
| 2023–2026 | The Amazing Digital Circus | Lead animator | Lead animation on multiple episodes |
| 2023–2024 | Murder Drones | Lead animator / Animator | Lead animation on multiple episodes |
| 2024 | Boxtown | Composer | Season 1 |
| 2025 | The Gaslight District | Lead animator / Crowd animation | Pilot episode |

=== Video games ===
| Year | Title | Role | Notes |
|---|---|---|---|
| 2019 | Concrete Genie | Animator | Additional animation support |
| 2020 | Marvel’s Avengers | Animator | Animation support |
| 2022 | Potionomics | Animator | Additional support |
| 2022 | High on Life | Musician | Additional music support |
