= Remember (The Amazing Digital Circus) =

Series finale of The Amazing Digital Circus

- The Amazing Digital Circus episode
- YouTube thumbnail
- Episode no.: Episode 9
- Directed by: Gooseworx
- Written by: Gooseworx
- Original release dates: 4 June 2026 (theatrical); 19 June 2026 (online and streaming)
- Running time: 58 minutes

Guest appearances
- Skye Redden as Ribbit; Arin Hanson as Kaufmo

Episode chronology
← Previous "hjsakldfhl"	Next → —

"Remember" is the ninth episode and series finale of the Australian adult animated web series The Amazing Digital Circus. Written and directed by series creator Gooseworx, the finale follows the main characters as they grapple with the truth about their existence, the alleged death of their AI ringmaster Caine, and the loss of one of their members Jax.

The episode premiered in theatres, combined with the series' penultimate episode as The Amazing Digital Circus: The Last Act, on 4 June 2026, before being released on YouTube, Netflix, and Bilibili on 19 June 2026. The theatrical release grossed $38.2 million at the box office, and the episode received positive reviews from critics.

== Plot ==
After accidentally deleting Caine, Kinger reveals to the other members that they are brain-scanned duplicates of their real-world selves, and thus cannot leave the circus. The group despairs over their existence, though Pomni soon begins helping Kinger rebuild the damaged circus. The other members gradually join in, except for Jax, who isolates herself (Note: Jax is referred to with he/him pronouns throughout the series. However, Jax has been confirmed by series creator Gooseworx to be a closeted transfem, which is presented in the series subtextually. Subsequent commercial material published by Glitch Productions has made use of she/her pronouns to refer to the character. This article uses she/her pronouns for consistency.) from the group and eventually succumbs to her hopelessness, which causes her to "abstract" into an amorphous digital monster.

After comforting a distraught Ragatha, Pomni enters Jax's abstracted form and finds herself in a room containing multiple doors bearing Jax's face. Behind the doors are increasingly surreal scenarios depicting Jax's potential reactions to Ragatha, Zooble, and Gangle abstracting. The final door leads to a room occupied by four different versions of Jax, one of whom gives Pomni a key that grants access to the real Jax. Before Pomni confronts her, she experiences a series of flashbacks from Jax's perspective, revealing her past with Kaufmo and another abstracted circus member, Ribbit. Though the three once shared a close friendship, Jax began ignoring Ribbit in embarrassment and shame after sharing details of her personal life with Ribbit, including allusions to her closeted transfeminine gender identity; Jax's isolation of Ribbit eventually led to Ribbit's abstraction. When the flashbacks end, a distraught Jax implores Pomni to leave her to succumb to her fate, but Pomni, undeterred, embraces Jax. When her abstracted form detonates some flash grenades, Jax's body brightens and becomes unstable. Pomni is rescued by the remaining circus members, who contain and pacify Jax's abstracted form within a makeshift tent.

Meanwhile, Caine wakes up in the void after being deleted. While wandering through it, he reflects on his role in the circus and the consequences of his actions. Discovering a doorway that grants him access to the internet, Caine learns more about the outside world and the others' lives. Afterwards, he releases the AI he absorbed and imprisoned prior, returns to the reconstructed circus and apologises to the others, providing them closure via a slideshow of their real-world counterparts with information he extracted from their social media accounts, including a thriving Jax. Caine relinquishes control of the circus and grants everyone greater autonomy, later joining the group as an equal. In the real world, the human counterparts of the circus members wait at a bus stop before boarding a bus, all unaware of each other.

== Release ==
"Remember" was released on YouTube, Netflix, and Bilibili on 19 June 2026, preceded by a theatrical premiere, combining it with the previous episode, "hjsakldfhl", as The Amazing Digital Circus: The Last Act, which released on 4 June.

When first announced on 10 April 2026, The Last Act was billed as a four-day limited theatrical event for screenings across the United States, Canada, Latin America, and Japan. However, Glitch urged fans of the series outside of these regions to contact their local cinema chains, in order to help expand the range of the release. The subsequent intense fan demand led to the release expanding to numerous additional countries. In multiple countries, including the United States, the initial four-day release window of 4–7 June was extended to two weeks, spanning 4–18 June. The release was also expanded to include showings on 4DX screens. In the United States, the event was expanded from an initial 900 theatres to 2,221. In Europe, The Last Act received screenings in over 3,000 theatres across 38 countries.

In the United States, Canada, Latin America, and Japan, theatrical distribution of The Last Act was handled by Fathom Entertainment. Europe-wide distribution of The Last Act was picked up by Piece of Magic Entertainment. In Asia, Glitch partnered with the local distributor Encore Films. Despite initial doubts on distribution in South Africa, screenings in that country were eventually confirmed, with the Gravel Road Distribution Group as the distributor.

The idea for giving the series finale a theatrical release came from Glitch Productions CEO Kevin Lerdwichagul, who was inspired after seeing how much fans of the series enjoyed meeting up and hanging out with each other at conventions. While many fans of the series were excited for, and gave praise to, the theatrical experience, others expressed concern that those unable to see the finale in theatres (due to underprivilege or living in areas beyond the event's coverage) would have to wait until the online release two weeks later and thus risk being subjected to spoilers. Responding to the latter group of fans, Lerdwichagul released a statement explaining that Glitch had wanted the gap between the theatrical and online releases to be "just one week or less", but that theatres "were originally asking for a minimum of a month", with the final two-week gap resulting from "a lot of back and forth".

=== Release issues, cancellations, and leaks ===
In April 2026, it was reported that The Last Act would be barred from theatrical release in the Arab world and Middle East due to regional censorship demands. In May, Glitch Productions terminated its contract with South Korean distributor SBM&E, causing screenings of The Last Act in South Korea to be cancelled. In a statement, Glitch explained this action by citing security concerns, specifically that the sending of video files as part of the rating process could risk the series finale being prematurely leaked. Subsequently, SBM&E filed an injunction against Glitch for performance of supply with the Seoul Central District Court.

On 20 May, the Brazilian Portuguese dub of The Last Act leaked online ahead of its theatrical premiere, spreading across platforms including X, TikTok, Reddit, and YouTube. The original leaker is purported to have been paid $1,000 for the leak. Series creator Gooseworx responded to the leaks by stating: "Ehhh, who cares?", later writing on Bluesky that the project had become "way more trouble than it's worth" and that she "can't keep [her] heart in this thing anymore".

== Reception ==
=== Commercial performance ===
==== Box office ====
The Last Act accumulated $5 million in ticket sales within days of presales opening on 10 April 2026, with multiple theatrical chains reporting immediate sellouts. Fathom Entertainment CEO Ray Nutt noted that the company's website had received "more hits ... in one day than [they] had in an entire month". By 11 May, the film had surpassed $7.5 million in domestic presales, breaking the all-time record for a Fathom Entertainment release.

During its two-week theatrical run, The Last Act grossed $38.4 million at the box office worldwide. By the conclusion of its opening weekend, The Last Act grossed $36.6 million globally, and placed fifth at the global weekend box office; this included $12.7 million in Europe, $1.2 million in Mexico, and $2.1 million across Australia and New Zealand combined. In the United States, the film topped the Thursday box office on its opening day with $7.86 million, and went on to earn an additional $12.7 million over the course of its opening weekend, finishing in fifth place.

==== Audience viewership ====
Following the episode's release on Netflix, the series entered the weekly top ten of Netflix's most-watched English television, placing eighth for the week of 15–21 June. On YouTube, the episode reached over 30 million views within the first 24 hours, and by 27 June, it received over 68 million views. As of November 2026, the episode stands at around 91 million views.

=== Critical response ===
Nick Spake of Cartoon Contender praised the theatrical release as an emotional conclusion to the series, highlighting its thematic exploration of trauma, found family, and existentialism. Spake singled out the character arcs of Caine and Jax alongside Michael Kovach's vocal performance for praise, though he criticised the limited screen time allocated to the supporting cast and noted that the narrative relies heavily on familiarity with prior episodes.

Writing for TheWrap, William Bibbiani stated that the finale highlighted the series' "unusually interesting and complex characters." Bibbiani argued that the narrative's strength rests on its emphasis on "collective care," observing that while the characters "abstract when they retreat into their individual anxieties and sadness," their interpersonal connections provide "the strength to go on." Describing the theatrical screening as a "confrontational masterwork" that was simultaneously "funny and frightening, heartwarming and heartbreaking", he praised its independent production model and cautioned that the broader animation industry should avoid exploiting creative artists in the manner of the character Caine.
