= Spudsy's =

Spudsy's may refer to:

- Spudsy's, fictional fast food restaurant in the television sitcom The Middle
- Spudsy's, fictional fast food restaurant in the "Fast Food Masquerade" episode of The Amazing Digital Circus
