= MD-5 =

MD5, MD 5, or MD-5 may refer to:

- MD5 cryptographic hash function
- Maryland's 5th congressional district
- Maryland Route 5
- MD-5 (Star Wars), a droid in the Star Wars saga
- MD-5, a team from the Australian web series Meta Runner
