= Zolo (toy) =

Construction toy

- Type: Construction set
- Invented by: Byron Glaser & Sandra Higashi
- Company: Zolo, Inc.
- Country: United States
- Availability: 1986–present
- Materials: Wood, plastic
- Slogan: "Play for real."
- Official website

Zolo (stylized as ZoLO) is a gender-neutral-art-inspired construction set. It was originally designed in 1986 and handmade from wood. The toy, now made from plastic, won several awards and became a pop culture icon of the 1990s.

== History ==
Inspired by the PoMo art and furniture design of Ettore Sottsass and the Memphis Group, the first Zolo playsculpture set was created in 1986 by Byron Glaser and Sandra Higashi. Discouraged by major toy manufacturers, the couple approached the Museum of Modern Art, becoming a top selling item there and winning Best New Product at the 1986 New York International Gift Show.

== Zolo sets ==
Many different playsculpture sets have been produced, some in wooden boxes, cardboard tubes, plastic tubes and paper cartons. This is an incomplete list:

- Zolo set 2 (wood pieces produced in Indonesia)
- Zolo set 3 (plastic pieces in tin)
- Zolo pop•Zolo
- Zolo pre•Zolo
- Zolo groove
- Zolo quirk
- Zolo risk
- Zolo a•go•go
- Zolo a•go•go curio
- Zolo •blanko
- Zolo CoZMo system
- Zolo HeliO system
- Zolotopia
- Motorized Zolo (produced by Wild Planet)

The Ertl Company also produced a series of licensed Zolo sets:

- Zolo 2200
- Zolo 3400
- Zolo 4500

== In popular culture ==
The toy was the source of inspiration for eccentric DJ Terry Sharkie in naming the musical genre and subculture of Zolo.

Zolo was recognized by the Toy Industry of America in the book 100 Years of the Power of Play. 2003.

According to the creator of The Amazing Digital Circus webseries, elements were inspired by Zolo.

== See also ==
- K'Nex
- Lego
- Tinkertoys
