= Glitch Productions =

Australian independent animation studio

Glitch Productions Pty. Ltd.
- Logo used since 2023
- Trade name: Glitch Productions
- Formerly: Glitchy Boy (2017–2018)
- Type: Private
- Industry: Animation
- Founded: 24 May 2017; 9 years ago
- Founders: Kevin Lerdwichagul; Luke Lerdwichagul
- Headquarters: Parramatta, New South Wales, Australia
- Area served: Worldwide
- Key people: Kevin Lerdwichagul (CEO); Luke Lerdwichagul (CMO); Jasmine Yang (COO)
- Products: Computer animation Traditional animation
- Number of employees: 250+ (2026)
- Subsidiaries: FinalFinal_Project

YouTube information
- Channel: GLITCH
- Years active: 2017–present
- Genre: Animation
- Subscribers: 23.5 million
- Views: 4.1 billion
- Last updated: 12 October 2026
- Website: www.glitchprod.com

Glitch Productions Pty. Ltd. (credited as Glitch and stylised in all caps; formerly known as Glitchy Boy) is an Australian independent animation studio based in Parramatta, New South Wales. The studio was founded in 2017 by brothers Kevin and Luke Lerdwichagul, previously known for creating the machinima comedy web series SMG4.

Since SMG4, Glitch has been known for independently producing animated web shows on YouTube. These shows include Meta Runner, Sunset Paradise, Murder Drones, The Amazing Digital Circus, The Gaslight District, Knights of Guinevere, and Gameoverse.

Glitch's founders were featured in Forbes' 30 Under 30 list for Media, Marketing, and Advertising in 2023.

== History ==
=== Background (2009–2017) ===
Co-founder Luke Lerdwichagul started making YouTube videos in 2009. Around 2011, Luke created a web series, SMG4, (Note: An acronym of "SuperMarioGlitchy4".) a Super Mario 64-based machinima YouTube channel. Produced using footage from an emulated version of Super Mario 64, the series originally focused on Mario and machinima characters going on adventures that often involve parodies of Internet memes and popular culture.

Around 2016, Luke's brother, Kevin Lerdwichagul, had observed the channel and its wide audience. He saw the potential to form a business around the channel, later joining SMG4 as a full-time writer and producer. Luke took on a directing role, as well as voicing his titular author surrogate character.

=== Creation and early years (2017–2020) ===
On 24 May 2017, Luke uploaded an entry to his fan mail series on the SMG4 channel and briefly mentioned that he had founded a company, dubbed Glitchy Boy, to represent SMG4, as well the Hobo Bros., and TheAwesomeMario channels. (Note: SMG4 (24 May 2017). Big Things Are Happening (AND TONS OF AWESOME FAN ART!) - SMG4 Mail Time #10 (Video). Archived from the original on 17 November 2023 – via YouTube.)

On 5 September 2018, in a formal announcement video, Kevin and Luke fully explained the concept of their company, now rebranded as Glitch Productions. (Note: @SMG4 (5 September 2018). SMG4 Direct (HUGE CHANNEL UPDATE) (Video). Archived from the original on 17 November 2023 – via YouTube.) On 5 December, following multiple teasers on the SMG4 channel, Glitch released the trailer for Meta Runner, and the first episode premiered on 25 July 2019. The series was funded by Screen Australia, and became the top-performing online investment from the company, racking up 10 million viewers across its first season. The first season was also financed with support from Crunchyroll and AMD, and was produced in association with Epic Games. On 20 April 2020, Screen Australia announced that they would be funding a second season of Meta Runner.

=== Separation from SMG4 and growth (2020–present) ===
Kevin Lerdwichagul (left) and Luke Lerdwichagul (right) presenting Glitch Direct 2025.

On 27 August 2020, Glitch officially moved their non-SMG4 projects to a new channel titled GLITCH. (Note: SMG4 (28 August 2020). My whole life has been leading up to this. Archived from the original on 11 November 2020 – via YouTube.) Shortly after, the studio released the pilot Ultra Jump Mania—a spin-off of Meta Runner that was later cancelled—and season 2 of Meta Runner in 2020. Meta Runner ended following a third season in 2022 after a total of 28 episodes and three animated shorts.

On 12 March 2021, Glitch unveiled an SMG4 spin-off centred on the character Meggy Spletzer titled Sunset Paradise. The pilot was released on 26 March, and on 12 May 2021, the show received online production funding from Screen Australia. The show concluded in July 2021 after ten episodes. On 9 October 2021, Glitch announced a pilot titled Murder Drones, created, written, and directed by Liam Vickers, which premiered on 29 October. While earlier Glitch projects were produced at a monetary loss, Murder Drones performed exceptionally well, earning millions of views per episode. The show concluded in August 2024 after eight episodes.

On 1 September 2023, Glitch announced a livestreaming event titled "GlitchX" for 9 November 2023, featuring discussions on independent animation with various creators. On 13 October 2023, the pilot for The Amazing Digital Circus, created in collaboration with Gooseworx, was released. The success of the pilot prompted Glitch to significantly expand its team, growing from around 20–25 staff members to over 100 artists.

On 4 October 2024, Glitch announced that The Amazing Digital Circus would debut on Netflix, making it the studio's first production on the platform. Glitch retained full creative control, with episodes continuing to premier on YouTube first. On 17 January 2025, Glitch announced its first 2D animated series, Knights of Guinevere, created with Dana Terrace, John Bailey Owen, and Zach Marcus. Its pilot premiered on 19 September 2025.

On 16 May 2025, Glitch announced that Murder Drones had been added to Amazon Prime Video under a multi-title licensing deal for current and future series. During the studio's first "Glitch Direct" presentation on 10 October, Glitch announced a co-production of the Lackadaisy animated series. The studio also unveiled two new banners: "Glitch Presents" for co-productions and "Glitch Originals" for self-produced projects, alongside hiring Olan Rogers as Head of Development.

On 23 January 2026, Gameoverse, created with Ross O'Donovan, was revealed; its pilot premiered on 15 May 2026. On 17 August, it was announced by the National Film and Sound Archive of Australia that Glitch would be a part of the "Creator Capsule," which was made to archive YouTube channels.

== Controversies ==
In March 2024, Glitch faced criticism following the abrupt recasting of Celeste Notley-Smith, the voice actress for Tari in Meta Runner and SMG4. Notley-Smith stated on X that she was recasting without prior notice. General manager Jasmine Yang later cited a communication failure for the oversight. The controversy led voice actress Robyn Barry-Cotter to depart the studio in solidarity.

The studio was additionally accused of maintaining long work hours, employee blacklisting, and workplace pressure. On 4 March 2024, Kevin Lerdwichagul issued an apology on behalf of the studio, attributing earlier workplace issues to rapid growth and staffing shortages while maintaining that conditions had significantly improved by 2023.

== Filmography ==
=== Web series ===
Title	Creator(s)	First released	Last released	Ref.
SMG4	Luke Lerdwichagul	7 May 2011	27 December 2025	
TheAwesomeMario	Luke Lerdwichagul	14 July 2013	31 December 2017	
Hobo Bros.	Kevin Lerdwichagul; Luke Lerdwichagul	3 December 2016	1 January 2021	
Hitbox	Kevin Lerdwichagul; Luke Lerdwichagul	21 September 2018	20 December 2019	
Meta Runner	Kevin Lerdwichagul; Luke Lerdwichagul	25 July 2019	10 September 2022	
Sunset Paradise	Kevin Lerdwichagul; Luke Lerdwichagul	26 March 2021	31 July 2021	
Murder Drones	Liam Vickers	29 October 2021	23 August 2024	
The Amazing Digital Circus	Gooseworx	13 October 2023	19 June 2026 (Note: The finale was originally released in theaters on 4 June 2026 as a cinematic event titled The Amazing Digital Circus: The Last Act.)	
The Gaslight District	Nick Szopko	18 April 2025	TBA	
Knights of Guinevere	Dana Terrace; John Bailey Owen; Zach Marcus	19 September 2025	TBA	
Gameoverse	Ross O'Donovan	15 May 2026	TBA	

==== Upcoming ====
Title	Creator(s)	Releasing	Ref.
Lackadaisy (Note: Co-production with Iron Circus Animation)	Tracy Butler	TBA	

=== Pilots ===
Title	Creator(s)	First released	Status	Ref.
Ultra Jump Mania	Luke Lerdwichagul; Kevin Lerdwichagul	4 September 2020	Cancelled	

=== Comics ===
- Meta Runner: Source (2022)
- Murder Drones (2026; produced by Oni Press under license from Glitch)

=== Video games ===
- Glitch Karts (2025; developed by LWMedia)

== See also ==
- Jellybox – American independent animation studio
- Luv Letter Studios – American independent animation studio
- SpindleHorse – American independent animation studio
