= Censorship in Islamic societies =

Organization of Islamic Cooperation (OIC) member nations highlighted in green. The 57-nation OIC has lobbied at the international level for a global ban on speech criticizing Muhammad.

Islamic teachings and argument have sometimes been used for religious censorship throughout history, and there are many cases of censorship in Islamic societies. One example is the fatwa (religious judgment) against The Satanic Verses (a novel), ordering that the author be executed for blasphemy. Depictions of Muhammad have inspired considerable controversy and censorship. Leaders of the member states of the world's largest Islamic organization, known as the Organization of Islamic Cooperation (OIC), called for a categorical ban on stuff that could be deemed as denigration of the Islamic prophet Muhammad in 2012.

Quran 2:256 prohibits "compulsion in religion". Some Islamic societies have religious police, who enforce the application of Islamic Sharia law.

In non-Islamic countries, Islam has often been cited as a reason for self-censorship. Sometimes this self-censorship is because of threats of violence.

== Calls for global censorship ==
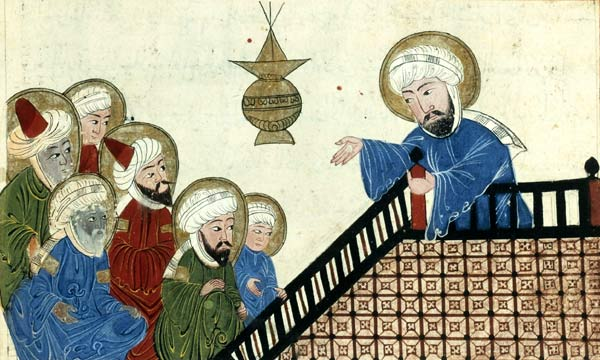
A page from a 15th-century illustrated copy of a book by Al-Bīrūnī, depicting Muhammad at the Farewell Pilgrimage. This image was the subject of a 2008 petition to have it removed from Wikipedia.

The (OIC), the world's second largest intergovernmental organization, comprising fifty-seven Islamic states, has actively lobbied for a global ban on what it perceives as anti-Islamic blasphemy, especially after the publication of Innocence of Muslims — a "low-quality film" depicting Muhammad as a madman, philanderer, and pedophile, — triggered protests and demonstrations in over a dozen Islamic countries; but these OIC actions constitute a major step to criminalize speech critical of religion.

Ekmeleddin İhsanoğlu, a Turkish citizen and the Secretary General of OIC, also called for a ban on insults against the Islamic prophet. He said, "If the Western world fails to understand the sensitivity of the Muslim world, then we are in trouble". He asserted provocative insults are "a threat to international peace and security and the sanctity of life".

However, the opposition from Western nations barred the resolution from being accepted. Ihsanoglu said, "We could not convince the European countries to vote with us, the United States doesn't vote with us." Western countries see the publication of such images and materials as a matter of free speech, whereas the OIC sees these, according to Ihsanoglu, as an abuse of this freedom that Western countries should sanction through their own blasphemy or hate crime laws.

== In Asia ==
=== Afghanistan ===
The Taliban, which ruled Afghanistan after the mid-1990s, had the most strict, deeply enforced Islamic censorship of any other government in the Muslim World. They enforced and imposed a blanket ban on all films and videos depicting living beings. The Taliban fully fell in 2002 and Afghan President Hamid Karzai's administration began, with expectations of a move towards more secular policies.

However, Karzai has worked with members of the Islamic Council of Scholars to censor television programs regarded as sinful, particularly those created by the Indian entertainment industry (many Afghan Islamists often euphemistically refer to Hindus in said industry as "worshipers of graven idols"). One of Afghanistan's most popular television soap operas, Kyunki Saas Bhi Kabhi Bahu Thi, has faced threats of a total banning from the country unless the shows were heavily modified.

Azim Roboti, director of the Kabul company 'Caravan Film', has remarked about Islamic censorship,

The Taliban are on the offensive and terrorism continues unabated. Ordinary Afghans view foreign troops with growing suspicion and now we have a sort of restoration. It's hardly surprising that Karzai should listen first to religious leaders, even if it means blocking social and cultural development.

With the reestablishment of Taliban rule in 2021, the interim government replaced the Ministry of Women's Affairs with the Ministry of Virtue and Vice, which is responsible for patrolling the city and enforcing the Sharia Law. Taliban has enforced the ban on music and women from speaking on TV and radio channels. It has also banned women from playing sports. Additionally, the Taliban under hardline leadership has reinstated the ban on living beings since 2024.

=== Bangladesh ===
Several books of the Bangladeshi writer Taslima Nasrin have been banned in Bangladesh, including her novel Lajja. Militant Islamist groups announced a bounty on Nasreen's head and in October 2002, a court sentenced Nasreen in absentia to a year in jail for her "derogatory remarks about Islam".

=== India ===
Although India's constitution protects freedom of speech as a fundamental right, it allows for "reasonable restrictions" in the interests of "public order, decency or morality".

- In 1989, India became the second country, after Singapore, to ban Salman Rushdie's The Satanic Verses for its purported attacks on Islam. Indian authorities clarified that their decision didn't have anything to do with the literary merit of the novel. In virtue of the emotional distress that book caused to the Muslims, Indian government was asked to cancel Rushdie's visa.
- 1990, Understanding Islam through Hadis by Ram Swarup was banned. In 1990 the Hindi translation of the book was banned, and in March 1991 the English original became banned as well.
- Islam — A Concept of Political World Invasion by Muslims By R. V. Bhasin was banned in Maharashtra during the tenure of Vilasrao Deshmukh (ex Chief Minister, Maharashtra) on grounds that it promotes communal disharmony between Hindus and Muslims. Later the author's house in Colaba was raided and the authorities confiscated 1000 copies of the Book.
- A Tamil film produced by Kamal Haasan titled Vishwaroopam was blocked by the Tamil Nadu state government following the protest by a group of Muslim organizations led by the Federation of Islamic Movements which alleged that it depicted Muslims inappropriately.
- In February 2013, a fatwa was issued by one of the prominent clergyman of Kashmir, Bashiruddin Ahmad, against an all-girl Kashmiri rock band Pragaash for being "un-Islamic". The band was dismantled following the online threats.

=== Iran ===
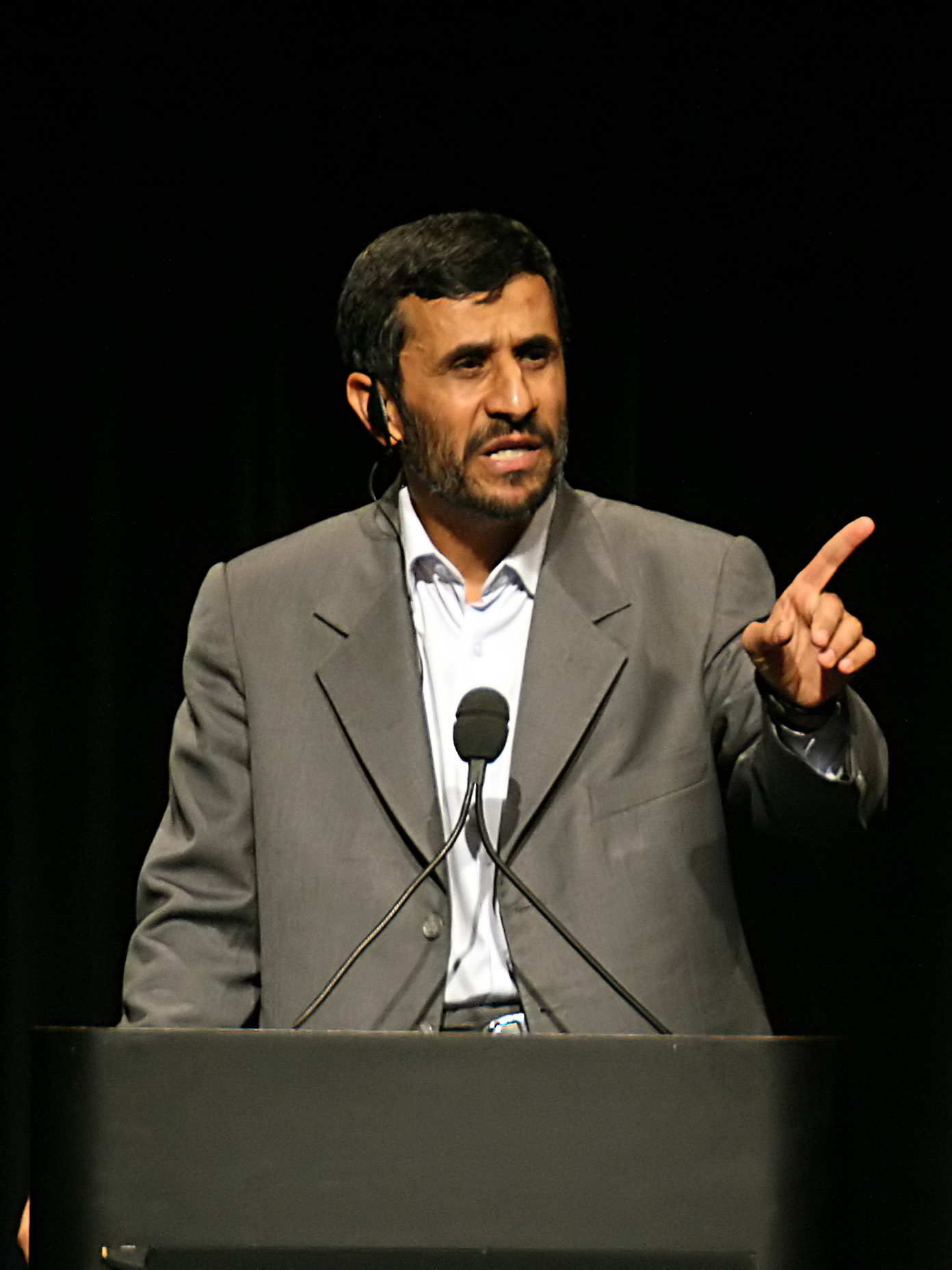
Mahmoud Ahmadinejad tightened Islamic censorship of his nation's media after his election.

The Shah's government eschewed Islamic censorship, with popular commercial films featuring frank sexual themes and even nudity. The regime largely concerned itself with fostering feelings of legitimacy and making sure that films always portrayed it in a positive light. The Shah personally intervened in a 1934 film biopic to make sure that the protagonist, the poet Firdawsi, viewed the ruler character as a patron of the arts.

In the Islamic Republic of Iran, members of the 1979 Revolution sought to use film and other measures to shift public opinion's against the Shah's regime and, upon taking power, utilized filmmakers for ideological support. In some circumstances, this meant more rights than under the Shah such as use of minority dialects by characters. However, the Islamic government has strictly regulated films in order to suppress messages perceived as un-Islamic, using religious bureaucracies such as the Council of Screenplay Inspection and the Council of Film Reviewing to alter and delete specific lines and scenes against filmmaker's wishes.

In particular, the government forbids the depiction of women either singing, dancing, or both. Actresses also must conceal their hair at all times, even in moments when the characters are shown alone in their own homes. Censors suppress the showing of direct physical contact between members of the opposite sex. Despite this tradition of censorship, some officials have relaxed implementation of Islamic standards, particularly since the death of Ruhollah Khomeini in 1989 (which resulted in the film Two Women by Tahmineh Milani being un-banned before receiving widespread public acclaim).

Iran's government, through the Ministry of Culture and Islamic Guidance, reviews written works before allowing authors to be published. This process tends to involve having three separate officials inspect works for offending words and phrases, which can take several months to years before approval is granted. Authors with banned works include Plato, Louis-Ferdinand Céline, James Joyce, Kurt Vonnegut, and Paulo Coelho. Ayatollah Ali Khamenei has publicly attacked the impact of "harmful books" on his nation, analogizing them with "poisonous" drugs.

Iranian censorship of books grew stricter after then-President Mahmoud Ahmadinejad's administration began in 2005. His government authorized booksellers to distribute Memoria de mis putas tristes by Nobel-prize winning author Gabriel García Márquez, which had the five-thousand first edition sell out in short notice, but it reversed course and banned further reprinting. Muslim religious conservatives objected to the story's plot, which describes an isolated ninety-year-old man seeking a night of "wild love" with an adolescent prostitute.

=== Iraq ===
Censorship for both socio-political and religious justifications, intertwined, was widespread in Iraq's government in the 20th century. In particular, the Iraqi Law on the Censorship of Foreign Films of 1973 banned the showing of anything with "the propagation of reactionary, chauvinistic, populistic, racialist or rationalistic ideas, of favoring the spirit of defeatism, serving imperialism and Zionism", prohibiting as well anything "defaming the Arab nation and its goals". Iraq's government effectively had the ability to ban any film for any reason whatsoever at any notice.

=== Malaysia ===
In 2006 alone, 56 publications were banned by the Internal Security Ministry, including the Indonesian translation of Charles Darwin's On the Origin of Species. In January 2014, an image of pigs was censored in the Malaysian edition of the International New York Times, with the pig's faces blacked out.

=== Maldives ===
In November 2011, the blog of journalist Ismail Khilath Rasheed was shut down by Communications Authority of the Maldives (CAM) on the order of the Ministry of Islamic Affairs, on the grounds that the site contained "anti-Islamic material". Rasheed, a self-professed Sufi Muslim, had argued for greater religious tolerance.

=== Pakistan ===
The government of Pakistan maintains strict censorship of its citizens' access to the internet, with the Ministry of Information Technology's sub-agency the Pakistan Telecommunication Authority monitoring and filtering a variety of websites accused of playing host to perceived anti-Islamic content. Examples of cautioned websites include Google, Yahoo, Bing, YouTube, Hotmail, MSN, and Amazon. The government banned access to Facebook outright for two months in mid-2010 after the controversial page titled "Everybody Draw Mohammed Day" received public attention.

These measures have partially contributed to underlying tensions between the Pakistani government and the U.S. government, with many of the aforementioned websites being American-owned.

=== Saudi Arabia ===
The Kingdom of Saudi Arabia has, in the words of the International Business Times, "resorted to drastic measures to limit free communication within its own borders." The administration blocks hundreds of thousands of websites for having content perceived as immoral. Censorship has grown more strict since the 'Arab Spring' revolutions began in early 2011.

Public cinemas became illegal in 1983 when conservative clerics deemed them a corrupting influence, claiming that both Western and Arab-language films were, "contrary to the teachings of Islam". In December 2017, the Saudi government announced its decision to end the 35-year ban on public cinemas. Films are still censored for content however, for instance censors removed a depiction of kissing from the first film screened in public.

=== Uzbekistan ===
Islam Karimov, the President of Uzbekistan, has implemented a degree of Islamic censorship over the nation's media, such as banning advertisements for alcohol or tobacco products. Those measures have been a part of a general plan of religious administration that has included running religious programming on state television, federally funding the building of mosques and the restorations of shrines, and the promotion of the official government muftiyat to smooth connections between the state and Islamic believers.

== In Africa ==
=== Algeria ===
During the Algerian civil war in the 1990s, at least 60 journalists were killed by Islamists.

=== Egypt ===
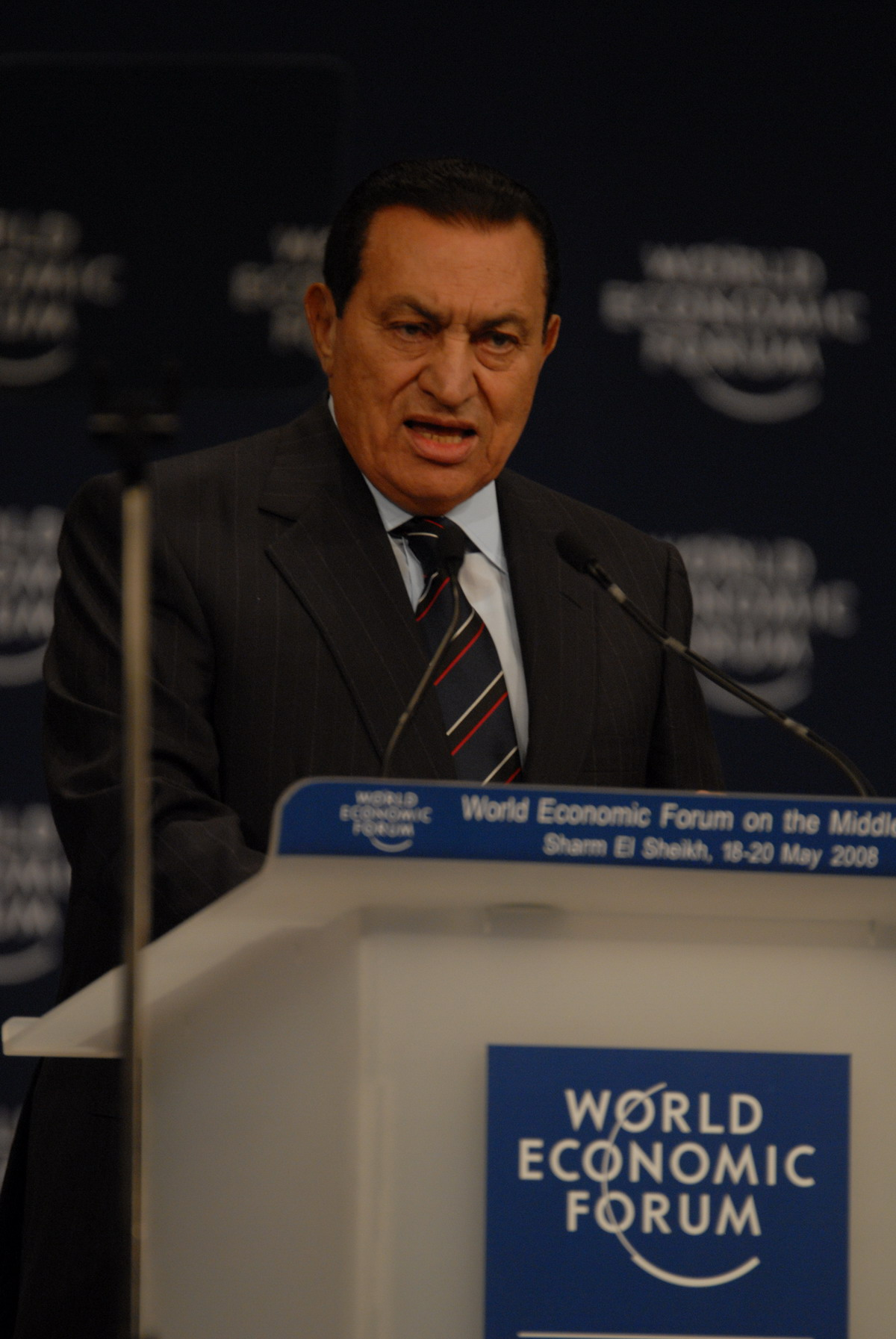
Hosni Mubarak implemented Islamic censorship as part of his outreach to anti-regime Islamists in the 1980s.

The government of Egypt, during the modern era, used a fundamentally secular legal code that went back decades. In 1985, Egyptian leader Hosni Mubarak and the National Assembly revised that code in order to try and take some of the heat off of Islamist anti-regime activists such as those in the Muslim Brotherhood by co-opting some of the Islamists' demands. Systematic Islamic censorship on the nation's media began at the same time as the imposition of religious education in state schools.

The government's Ministry of Culture typically worked with the Islamic Research Council, based out of Al-Azhar University, to implement Islamic censorship of the nation's film industry. For example, Youssef Chahine, one of the most popular Egyptian filmmakers in history, had the distribution of his successful 1994 work The Emigrant ended when the Council objected to a character's portrayal of the religious figure Joseph. Chahine sued and won, ensuring further showings of his film and showing the sometimes inconsistent nature of Egyptian censorship.

Egyptian films of the nation's classic cinema period often depict all sorts of physical affection such as kisses and hugging, and said films receive frequent play on the state-owned Egyptian Television Network. In the aftermath of the Arab Spring toppling of Mubarak's government, some conservative Islamists in Egypt's parliament have worked for a comprehensive censorship law banning such displays. Many Egyptians have expressed concerns about increasing Islamic censorship harming the nation's entertainment industries.

Although both secular and Islamic censorship has existed, widespread use of the internet, physical distribution of DVDs, and so on has broadly allowed a large variety of arts and media access. Those measures have not kept Cairo from being regarded as the largest arts and media publishing hub in the Middle East.

A coalition of participants in the Egyptian art world formed the 'Egyptian Creativity Front' to oppose Islamic censorship by the ruling Muslim Brotherhood, using the slogan "Long Live Free Art". The government has used article 44 of the new Egyptian Constitution as justification for their measures, which states "insult or abuse of all religious messengers and prophets shall be prohibited".

=== Tunisia ===
In one well-publicized instance of Islamic censorship, the government of Tunisia fined Nabil Karoui, owner of Tunis-based company Nessma TV, about $1,700 in May 2012 for airing the controversial film Persepolis. Said film includes a scene depicting Allah directly along with other disputed material. The government's ruling blasted Karoui for what it viewed as "broadcasting a film that disturbs public order and threatens proper morals".

== In Europe ==
=== Denmark ===
After 12 editorial cartoons, most of which depicted the Islamic prophet Muhammad, were published in the Danish newspaper Jyllands-Posten on 30 September 2005, Muslim groups in Denmark complained, and the issue eventually led to protests in many countries around the world, which included violent demonstrations and riots in some Islamic countries.

According to The New York Times, many of the demonstrations eventually turned violent, resulting in "at least 200 deaths" globally. Several death threats and reward offers for killing those responsible for the cartoons were made, resulting in the cartoonists going into hiding.

=== Netherlands ===
Dutch film director Theo Van Gogh received death threats for making a film about the treatment of Muslim women by other Muslims, titled Submission and was eventually murdered in 2004 by an Islamic radical in retribution. A letter pinned to Van Gogh's body with a knife was a death threat to Ayaan Hirsi Ali who provided the script and the voice-over for the film.

== In the Americas ==
=== The United States ===
The makers of the television series South Park were mired in controversy for satirizing issues surrounding the depiction of the Islamic prophet, Muhammad. The website for the organization Revolution Muslim, a New York-based radical Muslim organization, posted an entry that included a warning to creators Parker and Stone that they risk violent retribution for their depictions of Muhammad. It said that they "will probably wind up like Theo Van Gogh for airing this show." This caused the network Comedy Central to censor the episodes.

When an anti-Islamic film trailer titled Innocence of Muslims was uploaded to YouTube, it was perceived as denigration of the prophet Muhammad and it culminated in demonstrations and violent protests against the video. The protests have led to hundreds of injuries and over 50 deaths. Fatwas have been issued against the video's participants and a Pakistani minister has offered a bounty for the killing of the producer Nakoula. The film has sparked debates about freedom of speech and internet censorship.

YouTube itself was blocked in Afghanistan, Bangladesh, Sudan and Pakistan for not removing the video. Government authorities in Chechnya and Dagestan have issued orders to internet providers to block YouTube and Iran has announced that it is blocking Google and Gmail. In 2012 a request by White House was extended towards Google to reconsider the anti-Islam video in light of the violent protests in the Arab world and its rules banning hate speech on Google-owned YouTube, but Google didn't comply.

In 2008, Random House cancelled publication of Sherry Jones' The Jewel of Medina — a work of historical fiction focusing upon the life of 'Ā'ishah bint Abī Bakr, third wife of the Islamic prophet Muhammad — due to claims that the novel "made fun of Muslims and their history," and thus raised "a very real possibility of major danger for the building and staff and widespread violence" or even stood to create "a national security issue". Eventually, the novel saw publication in the United Kingdom and the Commonwealth by Gibson Square, and in the United States by Beaufort Books.

== See also ==
- Censorship in the Middle East
- Censorship by country
- Religious censorship
