= Censorship in the Middle East =

Censorship is a policy used by governments to retain control over their people by preventing the public from viewing information considered by the republic as holding the potential to incite a rebellion. The majority of nations in the Middle East censor the media, including Bahrain, Egypt, Iran, Saudi Arabia, Syria, Turkey and the United Arab Emirates.

== Internet censorship ==
A variety of techniques are used to censor Internet media. One of the first ways is for the government to place legal restrictions on the internet service providers or exhibit direct control over them. Through this control, the government blocks certain websites or media (such as pictures, videos, and news articles), and is even able to place surveillance over certain sources. The second way is for the government to outlaw, or even make informal requests discouraging the existence of controversial media corporations in their countries, in order to prevent the spread of ideas proposed by said companies. With these three methods, governments may remove certain unwanted content and therefore control the thoughts of their people.

== Censorship during the Arab Spring ==
As a result of the Arab Spring, totalitarian regimes cracked down on information flow. Reporters Without Borders states, "at least 199 of those engaged in informing the public were arrested in 2011, a 31-percent increase compared with the previous year." Since early 2011, Bahrain has used censorship techniques such as slowing down Internet speeds, to prevent the spread of pictures and videos, monitoring internet use, and blocking controversial sites and topics. Bahrain enforced subtle tactics, whereas Egypt completely shut down the Internet for five days during the period of the most unrest in January 2011. Other nations, despite their effort to continue a strict censorship program, find it impossible to censor all material with the potential to spark a rebellion due to the wealth of information now available through the media. In recent years, more information has slipped through the cracks than ever before. For example, Arab television stations aired an Israelite nationalist video on the anniversary of Israeli independence, mainly because "[Jordan] couldn't censor it," according to Jon Alterman. By 2011, Internet users in Egypt and Tunisia especially have found ways around the censorship. Egyptian bloggers reported abuses committed by the state, such as police beatings and activist arrests. These bloggers were then arrested, spurring other bloggers to report the arrests of the previous bloggers. As the censorship in Egypt came crashing to the ground, so did the reign of Mubarak. In Tunisia, Internet users created their own version of WikiLeaks, called "Tunileaks." Tunileaks informed the public of the shortcomings of their leader, Ben Ali, and again, sparked a revolution.

== Islamic Influence in Censorship Policies ==
Freedom of speech and right to the access of information in the Middle East is governed by Islamic principles. There is a specific position of human rights. Islamic principles have determined the trends present in social development. There are no sources that clearly state the regulation of freedom of speech, but this verse is used by many Muslim jurists: "And do not argue with the people of the Scripture except in a way that is best (29:46). The Shariah law greatly governs many Arab countries. The Islamic Council of Europe curated the Universal Islamic Declaration of Human Rights: people have the right to express their thoughts as long as it is within the limits of the Shariah law.

== Censorship Policies in Egypt ==
There are many censorship policies that exist in the Middle East. Egypt has witnessed many forms of media censorship. The Anti-Crime and Information Technology Crimes Law was ratified on August 18, 2018 in Egypt. There will be penalties if one hacks government systems. The law prohibits any information regarding the police or military being published.

In Egypt, there has been access blocked to various news websites and more than 500 websites belonging to media organizations. Several Journalists, citizen-journalists, and bloggers have been detained and sentenced to prison.

Before the cyber law was passed, the Egyptian parliament passed a law that treats social media accounts with more than 5,000 followers as media outlets. This means that they are subject to persecution if they publish fake news or break the law.

Under surveillance technology, authorities can block and monitor internet traffic. This cybercrime law allows authorities to block content that is a threat to national security or economy. There are similar laws present in Qatar, Saudi Arabia, and the UAE.

In July 2022, the Egyptian government announced that a relaxing on the censorship rules relating to casual street photography and photography in public spaces. In August 2022, Egyptian authorities blocked the Al-Manassa website on the evening of 14 July as part of a series of continued restrictions on the website, which is one of the few independent news sites operating from inside Egypt.

== Censorship Policies in Qatar ==
Qatar has a variety of laws regarding expression and censorship. Recently, there has been the amendment of the Penal Code by the addition of Article 136. This article allows for the imprisonment of anyone who publishes or broadcasts content which harm national interests or public opinion.

The Law on Printing and Publication issued in 1979 concerns censorship in Qatar. Article 62 deals with the creation of a committee in Qatar to control the censorship policies; representatives will be chosen from Ministries of Education, Interior, Labor and Social Affairs. Article 63 entails how artistic works need to be reviewed before they are published. Article 64 states that the Department of Publications and Publishing may direct the Censorship Committee and observe that technical, social, religious, ethical and cultural traditions are being followed. Article 65 states that sudden inspections can occur in cinemas and other locations in Qatar to make sure that films, ads and shows are appropriate.
