= Jellybox (studio) =

American independent animation studio

Jellybox Studio
- Type: Private
- Industry: Animation
- Founded: 2023; 3 years ago
- Founder: Gene Goldstein
- Headquarters: Los Angeles, California, U.S
- Key people: Gene Goldstein (president); Sean Aitchison (COO); Kasey Williams (creative director); Laura Estrella (animation director)
- Products: Web series; Commercials; Trailers; Music videos

YouTube information
- Channel: Jellybox
- Years active: 2023–present
- Genre: Animation
- Subscribers: 161 thousand
- Views: 16.7 million
- Last updated: 9 July 2026
- Website: jellybox.studio

Jellybox Studio, doing business as Jellybox, is an American independent animation studio based in Los Angeles, Cailfornia. Founded in 2023 by Gene Goldstein, the studio is known for producing animated web series, commercials, trailers, and music videos.

The studio began during the production of the web series NOXP, created by Goldstein in 2023, and eventually expanded to include client works. In 2024, Jellybox produced a series of animated shorts promoting animation workers' rights, which went viral. On March 31, 2025, the studio started a Kickstarter campaign to fund more shorts under the title Umbert Actually, raising $107,021. The first episode premiered on March 18, 2026, critically focusing on Walt Disney.

== Filmography ==
=== Web series ===
- NOXP (2023–present)
- Animation Workers Ignited Shorts (2024)
- Inchy & Pinchy (2024)
- Umbert Actually (2026–present)
- Enceladus V (TBA)
- The Means of Destruction (TBA)

=== Music videos ===
- "Poison Pop" - Qbomb
- "Ice Water" - Rebecca Sugar
- "Everything Is Fine" (Remix) - The Living Tombstone

=== Other works ===
- GingerPale - animation (What is Halloween?)
- Tournament Arc - Kickstarter Trailer
- Number Lore - animation
- Eggdog - 2D shorts
- Ice Cream Sandwich - animation
- TankHead - trailer

=== Video games ===
Title	Year	Developer	Notes
Grapple Dogs: Cosmic Canines	2024	Medallion Games	Trailer
