= Murder Drones =

Australian animated web series

- Genre: Adult animation; Horror comedy; Science fiction
- Created by: Liam Vickers
- Written by: Liam Vickers
- Directed by: Liam Vickers
- Voices of: Elsie Lovelock; Michael Kovach; Nola Klop; Shara Kirby; David J. Dixon; Sean Chiplock; Caitlin Dizon; Emma Breezy; Allanah Fitzgerald; Daisy Rose; Darcy Maguire
- Composer: Adam Dispirito (Note: Better known by his online pseudonym AJ DiSpirito.)
- Country of origin: Australia
- Original language: English
- No. of seasons: 1
- No. of episodes: 8

Production
- Executive producers: Kevin Lerdwichagul; Luke Lerdwichagul
- Producer: Kevin Lerdwichagul
- Editors: Luke Lerdwichagul; Abhignya Cavale
- Running time: 17–26 minutes
- Production company: Glitch Productions

Original release
- Network: YouTube
- Release: 29 October 2021 – 23 August 2024

Murder Drones is an Australian independent adult animated web series created, written, and directed by Liam Vickers and produced by Glitch Productions. It revolves around two models of autonomous robots—worker drones and disassembly drones—following the extinction of humans on their planet, and a rebellious worker drone who accidentally befriends a disassembly drone. Together, they uncover an eldritch force that threatens their post-apocalyptic world.

The series' pilot episode premiered on Glitch's YouTube channel on 29 October 2021, and it ran for eight episodes until 23 August 2024. The full series was released on Amazon Prime Video on 16 May 2025. It received positive reviews from critics for its animation, voice acting, action sequences, cinematography, and plot, though its pacing and humour received criticism. The series received four nominations, of which it won three, for a Webby Award in the Best Animated Video categories.

== Synopsis ==
The series occurs in 3071 on Copper 9, an Earth analog owned by the megacorporation JC Jenson. Worker Drones, autonomous robots designed to serve humans, inhabit the planet and harvest it for natural resources. The planet suddenly suffers a catastrophic core collapse, wiping out all biological life on the planet, including humans. As a result, the planet becomes a frozen wasteland, and only the Worker Drones remain. One day, three violent killing machines known as Disassembly Drones—nicknamed "Murder Drones"—invade Copper 9 to exterminate the remaining Worker Drones. The Worker Drones live in constant fear of the Murder Drones and hide behind a series of blast doors, in an attempt to protect themselves.

The protagonist of the series is Uzi Doorman, an angsty teenage Worker Drone who plans to defeat the murderous disassembly drones and save her kind. In the process, she forms an unlikely partnership with two of the Murder Drones—N, a drone with a friendly and curious disposition toward Worker Drones; and V, a sadist who is purposely elusive about her history with N—and works with them to uncover the truth about their origins and purpose in the planet's harsh environment.

== Characters ==
The three main characters of the series, from left to right: V, Uzi and N

- Uzi Doorman (voiced by Elsie Lovelock), a rebellious teenage Worker Drone who seeks to end her oppressed lifestyle.
- Serial Designation "N" (voiced by Michael Kovach), a friendly and eager Disassembly Drone who befriends Uzi and provides her with emotional support.
- Serial Designation "V" (voiced by Nola Klop), a sadistic Disassembly Drone and N's teammate who secretly harbours protective feelings towards him.
- Serial Designation "J" (voiced by Shara Kirby), the arrogant and abrasive leader of N and V's Disassembly Drone squad.
- Khan Doorman (voiced by David J. Dixon), Uzi's father, architect of the hydraulic doors protecting the Worker Drone colony, and leader of the colony's defense force.
- Thad (voiced by Sean Chiplock), Uzi's friendly jock schoolmate.
- Lizzy (voiced by Katie Hood), Uzi's popular classmate who bullies her and befriends V.
- Doll (voiced by Emma Breezy), Uzi's Russian-speaking classmate who harbours a vendetta against V for murdering her parents.
- Cyn (voiced by Allanah Fitzgerald), a Worker Drone who serves as the Disassembly Drones' system administrator and the primary host of an evil, reality-altering computer program called the Absolute Solver (also voiced by Fitzgerald).
- Tessa Elliot (voiced by Steph Crothers), (Note: Credited as Daisy Rose) a human girl who salvages N, V, J, and Cyn before the former three's remodelling into Disassembly Drones.
- Nori Doorman (voiced by Darcy Maguire), Uzi's mother and one of the Absolute Solver's hosts.

== Episodes ==
Every episode is written and directed by Liam Vickers.

No.	Title	Storyboard by	Original release date
1	"Pilot"	Liam Vickers	29 October 2021
The human population of the planet Copper 9 is wiped out by a planetary core collapse, leaving behind their robotic workforce, the Worker Drones. The workers are massacred by a trio of Disassembly Drones from Earth—designated N, V, and J—ostensibly sent by the interstellar corporation JC Jenson in response to the workers' newfound independence; the survivors retreat into a bunker fortified by worker Khan Doorman. Uzi, Khan's rebellious daughter, leaves the bunker to salvage parts for a railgun to use against the Disassembly Drones. She tests her weapon on N, who regenerates with short-term amnesia and malfunctioning optic sensors. Mistaking Uzi for a new teammate, N tries to befriend her until J restores his memory and vision. N infiltrates the bunker, kills the guards and attacks Uzi, but falters after Khan refuses to help his daughter and shuts them out to protect the other survivors. J installs a corrupting virus on N for questioning their directive. Uzi repairs N, and together they prevent the others from wiping out the colony, destroying J and capturing V. Heartbroken by Khan's betrayal, Uzi banishes herself with N and V and declares vengeance against the humans of Earth.
2	"Heartbeat"	Liam Vickers, Matthew Peckham and Jarrad Rumble	18 November 2022
J's mutated heart emerges from her remains, becoming a worm monster that consumes several Worker Drones. Uzi's classmate Thad informs her of the incident, coaxing her and N out of exile to investigate. The group learns about a supposed reboot program called the Absolute Solver, symbolised by an insignia that has begun appearing in place of Uzi's right eye; Uzi concludes that J is using the Solver to repair herself with the drones' assimilated matter. They are soon attacked by the worm-like Solver, which proclaims J and the other drones to be its puppets. The Solver unnerves Uzi with disturbing, lifelike holograms, including one of itself killing Khan. N rescues Uzi as her damaged railgun explodes, causing the Solver to vanish. Frightened and confused by the Disassembly Drones' true nature, Uzi shuns N and returns to Khan.
3	"The Promening"	Liam Vickers, Robin French and Cameron Qayoom-Taylor	17 February 2023
A guilt-ridden Uzi is approached by Doll and her friend Lizzy to receive a makeover for the upcoming school prom. However, Uzi escapes upon discovering that Doll is targeting her in a recent incident of prom queen candidates disappearing, while Lizzy, who befriended V, is conspiring to let her into the bunker. Meanwhile, N refuses to participate in V's plan to slaughter the prom-goers for their own sustenance, leading V to go alone. Uzi and N reconcile and head to the prom to stop V. Against the trio's expectations, V is crowned prom queen as part of a trap devised by Doll, who seeks revenge against V for killing her parents. Uzi and N rescue V, overcoming Doll's reality-bending Solver powers before V shoots Doll. Doll later regenerates and attacks the group again, but flees when Uzi manifests her own Solver powers against her. Meanwhile, the human JC Jenson technician Tessa Elliot and a cloned J arrive on Copper 9 to perform "maintenance work".
4	"Cabin Fever"	Matthew Peckham and Cameron Qayoom-Taylor	7 April 2023
Uzi travels to the abandoned Camp 98.7 to investigate a set of collars with significance to her mother, Nori. Uzi's class is forced to come along as part of a field trip, with N and V acting as supervisors as a pretence of finding Doll. Uzi eventually finds the "keybug", a golden robot cockroach designed to activate an elevator in the Cabin Fever Labs. When she returns to the campsite, a startled classmate fires at Uzi with an arrow, which her Solver powers turn into a living organic mass. Uzi flees into one of the cabins, where she grows fleshy wings and a tail similar to those of the Disassembly Drones. Against V's wishes, N searches for Uzi and finds an instructional video cassette titled "Zombie Drones", which triggers his repressed memories. Overcome with a craving for the drones' oil, Uzi kills several of her classmates and battles a hostile V before N intervenes, returning Uzi to normal. Uzi, N, and V leave with the other survivors, bringing the keybug and video cassette with them.
5	"Home"	Liam Vickers and Neda Lay	9 June 2023
N relives his repressed memories as a Worker Drone servant at Tessa's mansion alongside V, J, and a malfunctioning "zombie" drone named Cyn. Uzi establishes contact with N from the real world, having hacked into the comatose N and V's minds to keep their memories from being erased by Cyn, the Solver's host and the Disassembly Drones' administrator. With the past Tessa and J's help, Uzi and N evade a monstrously mutated V and unlock the mansion basement, where they learn that Cyn killed N and remodelled him into an undead Disassembly Drone alongside V and J. Uzi's hacking is interrupted when Doll intrudes to take the keybug, which Uzi begrudgingly gives her to save N and V. While the past Cyn takes control of the other drones and massacres the humans in the mansion, the present Cyn attempts to use V to lobotomise N in Uzi's absence, but N returns V to her senses before Uzi overrides Cyn's administration. Doll brings the keybug to Tessa and J at the frozen Camp 98.7 lake, where Uzi, N, and V find them.
6	"Dead End"	Neda Lay	18 August 2023
Tessa and J ally with Uzi's group, revealing Cyn as the one who sent the Disassembly Drones to Copper 9. Doll immediately takes the keybug back and enters the nearby Cabin Fever Labs alone, leading the group to give chase while J stays behind to guard Tessa's ship. The group is quickly apprehended by Alice, a cannibalistic Worker Drone lab subject who has used the facility's Velociraptor-like Anti-Drone Sentinels to kill the other subjects and intruding Disassembly Drones. During their escape, Tessa privately reveals to N that Cyn has already destroyed Earth, and urges him to save the universe over Uzi, who risks being possessed by Cyn the more she uses her Solver. After the Sentinels kill Alice and her minion Beau, Doll traps the group in the elevator hallway with more Sentinels and descends further down, damaging the elevator in the process. When the others are cornered inside the elevator, V remains outside and severs its cables to save them while the Sentinels surround her.
7	"Mass Destruction"	Neda Lay and AD Taeza	29 March 2024
Uzi, N, and Tessa are separated underground when Uzi's Solver triggers a cave-in. N encounters Nori's sentient heart, who owns a patch on a crucifix-shaped USB drive used for "exorcising" the Solver from its hosts. Doll is killed by Cyn while demanding the patch from Tessa to cure herself. Tessa follows the dying Doll to a cathedral where she finds and attacks Uzi. N decapitates Tessa and gives the drive to Uzi, but Cyn possesses Uzi and destroys the drive. Uzi regains control when N provokes her and Nori into bickering by confessing that he and Uzi "hang out", although Uzi accidentally kicks Nori down a pit into Copper 9's core in the process. Tessa reattaches her head and reveals herself as Cyn, having disguised herself with Tessa's grafted-on corpse since her arrival on Copper 9. Cyn eats Doll's heart and drags Uzi and N into the pit with her. Aboveground, J is confronted by Khan, Thad, and Lizzy after destroying the Disassembly Drones' landing pods under Cyn's orders, dropping her spaceship key into the pit. Before falling, Uzi throws N to safety with the key. Uzi later awakens in outer space, where she sees the planet's exposed core.
8	"Absolute End"	Neda Lay, AD Taeza, Robin French and Liam Vickers	23 August 2024
Having merged with Copper 9, Cyn begins consuming the broken pieces of the planet. Uzi reunites with Nori, who explains the Solver can be stopped if Cyn's heart is destroyed. N rescues Uzi in Cyn's spaceship, which Cyn destroys; Uzi and N affirm their relationship as they fall back towards the planet. J reveals her allegiance to Cyn and attacks Khan, Thad, and Lizzy, but V intervenes, riding a Sentinel she managed to tame. Uzi and N reunite with V while battling Cyn, who repeatedly attempts to possess Uzi again via callback. N and V eventually knock J into a chasm, while Uzi learns to resist Cyn's hacking attempts and rips the latter's heart out, causing Cyn's body to melt. When Uzi's Solver fails to destroy the heart, she resorts to swallowing it, imparting her with the Solver's abilities while allowing her to retain her sense of self. The drones resume their normal lives, with N and V now living in the bunker, and hold a funeral for Doll; meanwhile, J begins repairing her spaceship, and Cyn, whose consciousness now inhabits Uzi's tail, harmlessly pesters her.

=== Music video ===
Following the series' conclusion, Glitch produced an animated music video in collaboration with The Living Tombstone, titled "Fight Til' I'm Good Enough"; it was released on 17 October 2025.

Title	Directed by	Songwriters	Storyboard by	Original release date
"Fight Til' I'm Good Enough"	Zachary Preciado and Micah Preciado	Sam Haft and Yoav Landau	AD Taeza	17 October 2025
A year after the events of "Absolute End", N struggles with his feelings of not being "good enough" for Uzi after her parents imply that they disapprove of N and Uzi's relationship. At the same time, N, Uzi, and V are forced to contend with a zombie infection started by Cyn for her own amusement, during which N's fears of failing to protect Uzi almost get the better of him. With encouragement from Uzi, N overcomes his insecurities and is able to stop the infection after realizing Cyn was behind it, which earns him Khan and Nori's approval.

=== Special ===
On 17 July 2026, to promote a new line of Murder Drones merchandise, Glitch released an animated short episode titled "Meet J".

Title	Directed by	Written by	Original release date
"Meet J"	Zachary Preciado and Micah Preciado	Zachary Preciado and Micah Preciado	17 July 2026
J creates a training video detailing a day in her, N's, and V's lives on Copper 9, specifically focusing on her role as the team leader and the responsibilities that come with it. While N and V sleep, J retreats to her office to relieve stress but is called by Cyn, who reveals that she will be coming to Copper 9 soon to see the team's progress. As a terrified J struggles with the moral implications of concealing the truth about their mission from N and V, the latter notices her distress and gives her a JC Jenson-branded pen to cheer her up. After the Disassembly Drones leave to resume their mission, Uzi arrives at their hideout.

== Production ==
Prior to Murder Drones, series creator Liam Vickers had achieved online attention for his 2D animated pilot CliffSide. He first pitched Murder Drones to Glitch Productions with some early concept art and story elements, before becoming the writer, director, and showrunner of the series. Vickers took inspiration from the sci-fi and horror elements of Invader Zim and The X-Files. He wanted to make Murder Drones as his "love letter to the horror genre, plus carry through all those spooky ideas that maybe wouldn’t make it through on a mainstream service". Glitch also intended the series to "explore more mature concepts that [the audience and industry] might not associate with 3D animation". The series was animated using Unreal Engine.

== Release ==
Murder Drones' pilot was released on Glitch Productions' YouTube channel on 29 October 2021. By the time the series was announced, it had been worked on for a year. On 18 February 2022, Glitch announced that the full series was in development at the studio and that it would be released later that year. The show ended with the eighth and final episode released on 23 August 2024. The series was added to Amazon Prime Video on 16 May 2025. A Blu-ray including behind-the-scenes content was released on 4 September 2026, alongside two limited-edition versions of it. (Note: @GLITCH (4 September 2026). Wholesome murder robot show is coming to Blu-Ray with tonnes of extra wholesome goodies! (Video) – via YouTube.)

=== Graphic novel ===
A Kickstarter for a graphic novel adaptation of the series, to be published under Oni Press, was created on 8 September 2025, reaching its goal the same day. The first issue of the graphic novel was released in February 2026.

== Reception ==
=== Critical reception ===
Prior to the release of the pilot episode, Lauren Rouse of Gizmodo Australia praised the character designs and visuals. Common Sense Media reviewer Melissa Camacho said that the show "combines dark humour, dystopian themes, and fantasy violence to tell a good story." Joel Keller of Decider praised the characters and CGI and complimented the "zooms and shaky 'camera' work" for making the action sequences more immersive. Sal Cento of Movieweb praised the series' voice acting.

=== Awards and nominations ===
Year	Award	Category	Nominee(s) and episode	Result	Ref.
2023	Webby Award	Animation - (Series & Channels) Video	N/A	Nominated	
2023	One Voice Awards UK 2023	Animation - Best Character Performance - Female	Elsie Lovelock - ''"Uzi - Murder Drones"''	Won	
2024	Webby Award	Animation - (Series & Channels) Video	Episode 6 – "Dead End"	Won	
2025	Webby Award	Scripted (Series & Channels)	Episode 7 & 8 – "Mass Destruction" & "Absolute End"	Won	

== See also ==
- Adult animation by country § Australia
- List of web series
