= Luv Letter Studios =

American independent animation studio

- Type: Private
- Industry: Animation
- Founded: 2023; 3 years ago
- Founder: Kennedy Freeman
- Headquarters: New York City, New York U.S
- Website: luvletterstudios.com

Luv Letter Studios is an American independent animation studio based in New York City, New York.

== History ==
The independent animation studio was founded in February 2023 by Kennedy Freeman, with staff working on Re:Zero, Solo Leveling, Pokémon, Lazarus, Dan Da Dan, The Unwanted Undead Adventurer, Fate/strange Fake, Ruri Rocks, and other productions. As of March 2026, the studio, based in New York, has 70 staff, including musicians, voiceover artists, sound designers, and artists, based across the world, and works on "roughly seven to eight anime series a month." Animation Magazine and Anime News Network reported that the studio is presently working on several original projects such as Towards Galaxy's End, X Marks the Spot, Symphony Witches Orchestra, and a series putting a "new spin" on Peter Pan entitled Lost Girls. Luv Letter Studios is also a Black-owned and Black-led studio, creating works that are a "love letter" to animation, with a focus on "Eastern and Western 2D animation," according to Freeman. It was reported that the studio's team has worked on "over 60 productions" since its founding, and has been called a "Black-owned Japanese anime studio."

It was reported, in September 2026, that the Kickstarter for the first episode of Towards Galaxy's End had gained "nearly US$12,000 in funding," which was said to be "roughly six times its original goal of US$2,000," with plans for dubbing the series in multiple languages.

== Filmography ==
Title	Creator(s)	Releasing	Ref.
Towards Galaxy's End	Kennedy Freeman	TBA	
