= Meta Runner =

Australian independent-animated web series

- Also known as: Meta Runner: The Final Season (S3)
- Genre: Science fiction; Action; Cyberpunk; Esports
- Created by: Kevin Lerdwichagul; Luke Lerdwichagul
- Written by: Kevin Lerdwichagul; Jasmine Yang
- Directed by: Luke Lerdwichagul (Note: Credited as creative director for season 1, but was not credited for season 3.)
- Voices of: Celeste Notley-Smith; Robyn Barry-Cotter (Note: Credited as Robyn Moore for seasons 2 and 3.); Jessica Fallico; David J.G. Doyle; Brendan Barry-Cotter; Hayley Nelson; Anthony Sardinha; Amber Lee Connors; Elsie Lovelock; Jason Marnocha
- Theme music composer: Adam Dispirito (Note: Better known by his online pseudonym AJ DiSpirito.)
- Opening theme: "Always Running" (S1) by Adam Dispirito and Matthew Guerra; "Only Up" (S2) by Adam Dispirito and Lizz Robinett
- Ending theme: "Breeze" (S1) by Adam Dispirito and KIMI; "Steady" (S2) by Adam Dispirito and Matthew Guerra; "Trade" (S3) by Adam Dispirito, Matthew Guerra, and Lizz Robinett
- Composer: Adam Dispirito
- Country of origin: Australia
- Original language: English
- No. of seasons: 3
- No. of episodes: 28

Production
- Executive producers: Kevin Lerdwichagul; Luke Lerdwichagul; Jasmine Yang
- Producer: Kevin Lerdwichagul
- Running time: 12–23 minutes
- Production company: Glitch Productions

Original release
- Network: YouTube
- Release: 25 July 2019 – 9 September 2022

Meta Runner (known as Meta Runner: The Final Season in its third season) is an Australian independent-animated science fiction web series created by Kevin and Luke Lerdwichagul and produced by Glitch Productions. The series takes place in a futuristic society where entertainment and lifestyle are based around video games and esports. The best of the best gamers in this society are known as "Meta Runners", where they replace one of their arms with a cybernetic arm in order to optimize their gameplay performance. The series focuses on Tari, an amnesiac girl who discovers that she has the ability to warp inside video games, and comes across and helps an undercover group called MD-5 in their mission to expose the corrupt company, TAS Corp.

To promote the series, Tari first appeared as a character in the machinima parody web series SMG4, also created by Luke Lerdwichagul. The first season premiered on the SMG4 YouTube channel on 25 July 2019, with the second and third seasons premiering on the channel GLITCH on 16 October 2020. The third and final season premiered on 22 July 2022.

A pilot for a spin-off show titled Ultra Jump Mania, based on the fictional video game of the same name in the show, was released on 4 September 2020, but it was not picked up for a full season.

== Synopsis ==
In Silica City, all media and entertainment are mostly based around video games, not just serving as entertainment, but also jobs in live streaming and lifestyle. Among members of society are Meta Runners, individuals who have replaced their limbs with cybernetic arms that allow them to boost their gaming performance.

The series tells the story of Tari, a Meta Runner who was the subject of an experiment called Project Blue, led by Dr. Sheridan, a TAS Corp scientist. After waking up in a safehouse in the alleys of Silica City, Tari finds herself in the city with amnesia. The last thing Tari can remember is a sudden accident causing an explosion in the lab that supposedly kills Sheridan and his test subject, Lucinia Porter, a Meta Runner from TAS Corp.

== Characters ==
=== Main ===
- Tari (voiced by Celeste Notley-Smith), a shy and insecure Meta Runner who has the ability to warp into the video games she plays and has Meta Runner vision, a program that gives her the best strategies.
- Theo (voiced by Robyn Barry-Cotter), the goofy yet determined protagonist of the game Ultra Jump Mania, where he encounters Tari after she stumbles into his world. He gets transported to the real world via Tari's abilities.
- Sofia Porter (voiced by Hayley Nelson), a cheerful and upbeat girl who is one of Tari's friends. She is not known to play video games, but still helps MD-5 via her hacking skills.
- Lamar Williams (voiced by Anthony Sardinha), an easygoing otaku with a unique cybernetic arm and is a friend of Tari's.
- Masa Shimamoto (voiced by Brendan Barry-Cotter), a calm, composed, and serious friend of Tari but is a former team captain for TAS Corp. He was decommissioned after trying to hack into Lucks' private server to prove his theory that Lucks killed Lucinia.
- Belle Fontiere (voiced by Jessica Fallico), a rival of Tari. She is also a representative of TASCorp and their most celebrated Meta Runner. She is Lucinia's girlfriend, but after finding out about her apparent death, she begins to disobey her boss and act on her own accord.
- Derek Lucks (voiced by David J.G. Doyle), the arch-nemesis of Masa. He was the CEO of TAS Corp who was obsessed with Tari, due to her unexpected ability to warp into video games. He tried to capture Tari in order to discover the cause of her ability and give it to his other Meta Runners so that TAS Corp surpasses their competition. An AI version of Lucks appears as a recurring character in the 3rd season.
- Dr. James Sheridan (voiced by Anthony Sardinha), an ex-TAS Corp scientist who created the Meta Runner Arm and was behind Project Blue to try to prevent Lucks from firing him. He is presumed missing alongside Lucinia after an explosion while developing Project Blue.
- Evelyn Claythorne (voiced by Elsie Lovelock), a Meta Runner at TAS Corp., is shown to be extremely snobby, selfish, and whiny throughout her appearances in the show. She is also forced to be Tari's show match partner, even though she heavily resents Tari for stealing her spotlight.
- Lucinia Porter (voiced by Amber Lee Connors), was a Meta Runner at TAS Corp who vanished without a trace. Archival footage in the show and flashbacks reveal she was a test subject for “Project Blue” and was victim of a catastrophic explosion. Tari, while not knowing her, holds a mysterious connection to Lucinia, and resolves to discover it. She is the sister of Sofia and the girlfriend of Belle.

=== Minor ===
- Marco (voiced by Jason Marnocha), a host of underground gaming tournaments in the slums of Silica City. He collects Meta Runner arms and uses two of them as additional limbs. He joins the main cast in Season 3.
- Bo (voiced by Elsie Lovelock), a minor character who serves as the mascot of TAS Corp. She only appears on Silica City billboards.
- Bot-boys (voiced by Kevin and Luke Lerdwichagul), common robots found across Silica City, usually with a job or function. One is also shown to be in the game Ultra Jump Mania.
- Elder Tomato (voiced David J.G. Doyle), a character in the video game Ultra Jump Mania. His purpose in the game is to give the player expositionary information and advice. He is also a supporting character of the spinoff series Ultra Jump Mania.
- Satsuki-chan (voiced by Amber Lee Connors), a character from the dating simulation game Nova Explorers. She appears in the handheld dating simulation game Pocket Gakusei due to a crossover between the two games.
- Petey (voiced by Brendan Blaber), an NPC and a tutorial guide from Skybreakers.

=== Guest stars ===
- Announcer (voiced by Elliott "Muselk" Watkins)
- Male Civilian (voiced by James Rallison)
- Female Civilian (voiced by Kathleen "Loserfruit" Belsten)
- Announcer (voiced by Ross O'Donovan)
- Tempest Competitor 1 (voiced by Brodey "Bazza Gazza" de Meur)
- Tempest Competitor 2 (voiced by Nathan "Crayator" Clifford)
- Kizuna AI (voiced by herself)
- James Rallison (voiced by himself)
- Arin Hanson (voiced by himself)
- Admin 3 (voiced by Lizzie Freeman)

== Episodes ==
Series	Episodes	Originally released	
Series	Episodes	First released	Last released
1	10	25 July 2019	10 October 2019
2	10	16 October 2020	18 December 2020
3	8	22 July 2022	9 September 2022

=== Season 1 (2019) ===
No. overall	No. in season	Title	Creative Director	Written by	Storyboarded by	Original release date
1	1	"Wrong Warp"	Luke Lerdwichagul	Kevin Lerdwichagul and Jasmine Yang	Jarrad Rumble and Elle Nguyen	25 July 2019
An amnesiac woman named Tari wakes up in a lab in Silica City. She learns that she is a Meta Runner, people who replace their limbs with cybernetic enhancements to improve their video game performance. Tari walks into a TASCorp store and finds an arena in a back room, where she watches Meta Runner Belle Fontiere attempting to set the speedrun world record for the game Ultra Jump Mania. After Belle fails to achieve the record and the crowd leaves, Tari picks up Belle's controller and starts playing. Belle belittles Tari at first, but Tari's gameplay rapidly improves until she suddenly loses consciousness. She wakes up in the world of Ultra Jump Mania and encounters Theo, the game's protagonist. Meanwhile, Belle calls in her boss, Lucks, to investigate. He begins to berate Belle for her failure in the speedrun but soon becomes intrigued by Tari and urgently calls in his scientists.
2	2	"Out of Bounds"	Luke Lerdwichagul	Kevin Lerdwichagul and Jasmine Yang	Jarrad Rumble and Elle Nguyen	1 August 2019
Inside Ultra Jump Mania, Tari convinces Theo that she isn't an enemy and joins him on his platforming adventure. On the way, she discovers her Meta Runner vision, which gives her data and shows her how to overcome obstacles. Meanwhile, in the real world, Lucks and his scientists investigate Tari. Belle is unimpressed, but Lucks is optimistic about Tari's ability and hopes to give it to his own Meta Runners, pointing out that he invented the influential Meta Runner arm. Eventually, Lucks manages to appear to Tari in the game as a version of Theo. He talks to her about her abilities while the scientists begin drilling into her arm, causing her agonizing pain. With a burst of energy, Tari returns to the real world and is shocked to discover that Theo came back into reality with her.
3	3	"Bad Split"	Luke Lerdwichagul	Kevin Lerdwichagul and Jasmine Yang	Jarrad Rumble and Elle Nguyen	8 August 2019
Lucks confronts Tari and Theo, attempting to convince Tari to work for him at TASCorp. Tari refuses and, with help from Theo, manages to escape. The two hide in an alleyway, where Tari explains the danger they are in and Theo discovers that his video game abilities don't work in the real world. They enter a streaming pod to hide, but Theo inadvertently gives up their location to Belle by starting a live stream. Belle captures Tari and loads her into a TASCorp van, while Theo escapes. As Theo cries over the situation, a mysterious Meta Runner approaches him and tells him not to worry.
4	4	"Sequence Break"	Luke Lerdwichagul	Kevin Lerdwichagul and Jasmine Yang	Jarrad Rumble and Elle Nguyen	15 August 2019
In the TASCorp van, Belle dismisses Tari's worries about what will happen to her, claiming that she herself has been through worse. Their conversation is interrupted when a car hits the van. Tari escapes and boards the car, where she reunites with Theo and meets the Meta Runner Lamar Williams, who gives her a hoodie to cause signal interference so she can't be tracked by Lucks. Lucks and Belle pursue them in the van and a car chase through the city ensues, which culminates in Tari taking control of the car from Lamar and using her Meta Runner vision to avoid a barrier set up by Lucks. Impressed, Lucks decides his new goal is to acquire Tari herself, rather than merely her powers. Lamar brings Tari and Theo to a secret hideout in a ramen shop, where they meet Lamar's friends: Sofia Porter and the Meta Runner Masa Shimamoto.
5	5	"Aimbot"	Luke Lerdwichagul	Kevin Lerdwichagul and Jasmine Yang	Jarrad Rumble and Elle Nguyen	22 August 2019
Lamar and Sofia explain that they are members of a trio called MD-5 who want to take down TASCorp. They offer to let Tari and Theo join the group, but the leader, Masa, refuses to let them join unless Tari can prove herself in Battle Blaze, a first-person shooter game, to see how well she can handle a human opponent. Tari is easily beaten by Masa at first, but eventually warps into the game and begins improving. After a closer match, Masa defeats her again, but he is then taken out by Theo, who discovers that he can also warp into games. Seeing potential in Tari, Masa allows her to join the group. Theo then starts to glitch out due to being outside his game for too long. Meanwhile, at TASCorp, Lucks has Belle search an abandoned research facility that he suspects may be connected to Tari. She eventually finds a memory card containing video logs about "Project Blue".
6	6	"Game Plan"	Luke Lerdwichagul	Kevin Lerdwichagul and Jasmine Yang	Elle Nguyen	29 August 2019
Tari tries to leave Theo in MD-5's Ultra Jump Mania cartridge for his safety, but the presence of another Theo causes the game to glitch and boot the two out. Realizing that Theo needs to return to his own cartridge, Masa suggests "Operation Silent Demon" to get the cartridge from TASCorp, a plan that involves entering an underground competition hosted on TASCorp's servers and crashing the game, allowing Sofia to hack into the servers and leak their files to the public to damage Lucks's image, as well as place an order to recover Theo's cartridge. Lamar is skeptical, but concedes after Tari agrees to the plan. Meanwhile, Belle watches a video log from the crazed Dr. Sheridan about his work on Project Blue, an AI system that can beat any video game once implemented into a human host. The final log shows Sheridan and his assistant getting caught in an explosion during a failed test run. Belle is distraught upon recognizing Sheridan's assistant as her missing friend Lucinia. Belle shows Lucks the footage and he notices Sheridan execute a cheat code on a controller; he inputs the same code in the corrupted Ultra Jump Mania game, activating a secret function.
7	7	"No Clip"	Luke Lerdwichagul	Kevin Lerdwichagul and Jasmine Yang	Elle Nguyen	19 September 2019
Tari, Theo, Lamar, and Masa begin training for the upcoming competition in Tempest, a magic-themed battle royale game. In order to crash the game, Tari must execute a glitch by jumping off a mountain and falling through the ground at a specific angle and speed. After many failed attempts, Tari starts to lose confidence, but she receives encouragement from Theo and Masa and finally succeeds in pulling off the glitch. Reinvigorated, the group continues their training. Meanwhile, Belle is aggrieved over the death of Lucinia and questions its connection to Tari. Lucks claims that he is unable to find the answers and suggests that Belle should ask Tari herself.
8	8	"One Shot"	Luke Lerdwichagul	Kevin Lerdwichagul and Jasmine Yang	Elle Nguyen	26 September 2019
On the day of the Tempest tournament, Tari, Lamar, and Masa sneak Theo and themselves into the competition. As the game starts, Tari's game warp is briefly interrupted by a vision of Lucinia. In the match, MD-5 gather spells using Lamar's forcefield and Masa's kunai, but are forced to flee after a confrontation with an elite team. Lamar expresses concern over Tari's delayed warp and the group starts to argue, until the elite team returns and separates Tari from her teammates. They try to corner her, but her teammates protect her and go on the offensive.
9	9	"The Run"	Luke Lerdwichagul	Kevin Lerdwichagul and Jasmine Yang	Elle Nguyen	3 October 2019
MD-5 battles the enemy team; during the fight, they manage to take out three of the four enemies, but Theo is eliminated and the leader escapes. MD-5 gets to the top of the mountain and prepares to perform the glitch, but the group is attacked by the enemy team leader, who reveals herself to be Belle and takes out Lamar. Belle reveals to Tari that Masa was once a team captain for TASCorp, but was decommissioned a year ago for hacking into Lucks's private server to prove his theory that Lucks killed Lucinia. Masa tries to convince Belle to back down, but she refuses. After a fight, Belle eliminates Masa and immobilizes Tari. Lucks orders Belle to eliminate Tari, but she ignores him and begins to interrogate her instead.
10	10	"Shutdown"	Luke Lerdwichagul	Kevin Lerdwichagul and Jasmine Yang	Elle Nguyen	10 October 2019
Belle angrily demands Tari to tell her about her role in Lucinia's death and begins torturing her when she denies knowing anything. After encouragement from Theo, Tari manages to outwit Belle and execute the glitch. While trying to escape the arena, the group is cornered by a furious Lucks and subdued by his security personnel. Lucks shoots off Masa's cybernetic arm and threatens to shoot him in the head until Sofia shows herself. Lucks takes her tablet and wipes the TASCorp server data she obtained. Belle reveals the fate of Lucinia to Sofia (who is Lucinia's sister) and accuses Tari of being involved, causing Masa's trust in Tari to diminish. Lucks prepares to imprison MD-5 for life, but Tari offers to join TASCorp on the condition that Lucks lets everyone else go. Lucks reveals that he discovered MD-5's plan by using Theo as a spy camera via the corrupted Ultra Jump Mania cartridge. He traps Theo in a frozen state in a memory card, threatening to destroy him if Tari or her friends ever cause him trouble again. In a post-credits scene, Belle discovers Sofia's discarded phone, which has a backup of the data from Sofia's tablet. Lucks asks for a status update on a woman in a cryogenic freezer.

=== Season 2 (2020) ===
No. overall	No. in season	Title	Directed by	Written by	Storyboarded by	Original release date
11	1	"Hard Reset"	Luke Lerdwichagul	Jasmine Yang	Luke Lerdwichagul, Matthew Peckham, and Jarrad Rumble	16 October 2020
Six months after the events of Season 1, Belle and Tari are playing a match in a video game. After their win, the two are driven back to TASCorp by Lucks, who talks to an interviewer about Tari's imminent addition to TASCorp's main Meta Runner lineup in two weeks. After the interview, Lucks warns Tari to perform better at her debut match. Back at TASCorp, Tari is escorted back to her room while viewing the harsh treatment of TASCorp employees. Tari demands Lucks to allow her to see Theo to make sure he is still safe. Lucks shows her Theo on a screen, who is trapped in a featureless room. While talking to Theo, Tari promises him that they'll see MD-5 again, and Lucks hastily ends the call. Meanwhile, in the "low tier" of Silica City, Lamar and Sofia walk through an alleyway to find Masa, who had abandoned MD-5 after the events of Season 1. Masa brushes them aside at first, but Sofia reveals that she saved a backup of the TASCorp server data onto her phone. However, her phone is at TASCorp with Belle, who unsuccessfully attempts to hack into it. Fellow TASCorp Meta Runner Evelyn Claythorne bursts into Belle's room to complain that Tari is getting exhibition matches instead of her. Evelyn then angers Belle by insinuating that Lucinia abandoned TASCorp. Belle promises to Lucinia and Tari promises to Theo that they'll figure something out.
12	2	"Firewall"	Luke Lerdwichagul	Jasmine Yang	Luke Lerdwichagul, Matthew Peckham, and Jarrad Rumble	23 October 2020
Lucks talks to Theo, who is annoyed at him for trapping him. Lucks tells Theo they are working on a way to allow him to leave safely and gives him a chair, but Theo uses the chair to clip out of the room and lands in the TASCorp server. Lucks tries to stop him by deploying a data partition and quarantine programme, both of which Theo avoids, though the latter causes him to fall into an unknown file. Meanwhile, Tari and Evelyn are practicing a game called Hidden Heroes, with Belle overseeing them. Evelyn gets the edge over Tari and finishes her off. When Belle looks at the results of their match, the screen glitches and Theo lands on the screen, asking where he is, to Belle's shock. However, the quarantine programme catches Theo and drags him away. Back in Theo's prison, Theo asks Lucks if the deal to get him out is still available, but Lucks turns the screen off. Lucks reprimands his scientists and orders them to monitor Theo closely. Meanwhile, Evelyn openly complains that she has to share her debut match with Tari. The two bump into a TASCorp scientist, who is playing an anime dating simulator game called Pocket Gakusei. Evelyn mocks him and confiscates the game, but Tari gets an idea to contact Lamar (who is an otaku) via the game. In Masa's rundown house, Masa, Sofia, and Lamar discuss how to access the server backup on Sofia's phone, which Sofia thinks Belle is trying to get into. Glad that Belle finally came to her senses, Masa asks if they can just send her the encryption key, but Sofia explains that TASCorp has a stronger firewall, and if they send anything to Belle, Lucks will get tipped off about the phone. Lamar brings up that Tari and Theo are also trapped at TASCorp, but Masa angrily dismisses them as Theo was a spy camera and Tari was involved with Project Blue. Lamar and Sofia are able to convince Masa to help save Tari and Theo when they remind him of their promise to keep the two safe, but Masa says he needs a new Meta Runner arm since his previous one was shot off by Lucks. Sofia tells Masa they don't have money to buy one but can win one instead.
13	3	"Unreal Engines"	Luke Lerdwichagul	Jasmine Yang	Luke Lerdwichagul, Matthew Peckham, and Jarrad Rumble	30 October 2020
Masa, Lamar, and Sofia return to the low tier of Silica City to win a new Meta Runner arm. They enter a tournament hosted by Marco, an old friend of Sofia's who resents Masa for his former career at TASCorp. Marco challenges Lamar and Masa to a game of Turbo Crash 9; if Marco wins, Lamar must give up his Meta Runner arm, but if Lamar and Masa win, they get a new arm for Masa. At TASCorp, Tari searches Evelyn's room for Pocket Gakusei and finds it, but Evelyn catches Tari before she can leave. Belle arrives and discreetly allows Tari to use the game as long as she doesn't tell anyone. Back with MD-5, Lamar controls the team's vehicle while Masa handles weapons. Marco eventually gets the upper hand, but Masa and Lamar defeat him in the end when his arms begin to malfunction and they win the match, much to Marco's anger as he accuses Masa of cheating. They get the arm and drive back to Masa's place; in the car, Masa acts dismissive when Lamar asks if he cheated, but he is holding the control bug device that he used to make Marco's arms malfunction.
14	4	"Transfer Student"	Luke Lerdwichagul	Jasmine Yang	Luke Lerdwichagul, Matthew Peckham, and Jarrad Rumble	6 November 2020
Tari enters Pocket Gakusei in search of Lamar, but the search ends up being harder than she thought. Meanwhile, Belle visits Sheridan's abandoned lab and contacts Theo, asking him if he can obtain information about Project Blue from TASCorp's servers in exchange for helping him reunite with Tari. Theo agrees, and Belle takes control of him using a game controller to clip back into the server. In Pocket Gakusei, Tari's search comes up empty until she remembers that Lamar likes a character called Satsuki-chan, who she finds in the game. The character remains silent, and Tari learns she needs to fill up a relationship meter with her in order to talk to her. Back at TASCorp, Lucks catches Theo running around in the server again. Theo finds a Project Blue file thanks to a strange purple glow and begins downloading it for Belle, but he is attacked by Lucks's quarantine programme. Belle controls Theo to fight off the quarantine programme and defend the file. Belle inadvertently gives up her location in celebration of obtaining the file, forcing her to leave Theo behind before anyone finds her. Theo is caught again and Lucks puts him back in the corrupted Ultra Jump Mania cartridge, leaving him alone with enemies that he can't fight off due to the game's glitching.
15	5	"Heart to Heart"	Luke Lerdwichagul	Jasmine Yang	Luke Lerdwichagul, Matthew Peckham, and Jarrad Rumble	13 November 2020
In Pocket Gakusei, after sufficiently dating Satsuki-chan, Tari is able to get Lamar's profile from her. Tari sends Lamar a friend request, making contact with MD-5. Tari apologizes to Masa, saying she herself has a lot of questions like he must have, but Masa tells her they can sort that out after she's safe. Masa reveals they will help Tari escape during her upcoming show match. At TASCorp, Belle accesses the Project Blue file and sees footage of Lucks searching the abandoned lab shortly after the explosion, realising that Lucks knew what happened to Lucinia all along and was hiding it from everyone. Belle angrily leaves, swearing to avenge Lucinia. Tari is visited by Belle, who offers to help her and MD-5 expose Lucks. Sofia gives Belle the benefit of the doubt, but Lamar and Masa are not so keen on the idea, the latter saying Belle has let him down twice before and he cannot handle a third time. Tari convinces Masa to give Belle a chance; Masa agrees, but tells Belle that if she is on his team, she is to follow his orders. Belle reluctantly agrees to this as Masa begins to explain their plan for TASCorp's show match.
16	6	"Hack and Slash"	Luke Lerdwichagul	Jasmine Yang	Luke Lerdwichagul, Matthew Peckham, and Jarrad Rumble	20 November 2020
Lucks introduces Tari and Evelyn at the beginning of the show match, and Evelyn gives a long self-centered speech about how she never got the attention she deserved as the youngest child in her apparently famous family. Sofia causes a power outage and Lamar covertly replaces TASCorp's Hidden Heroes cartridge with MD-5's cartridge, which will download the server data from the phone as long as the game lasts for at least twenty minutes. Meanwhile, Belle returns to the lab to play the corrupted Ultra Jump Mania, where Theo is still trying to escape the monsters. Theo is initially annoyed at Belle for abandoning him, but she tells him if she can beat the game, it will reset, ending the glitching and allowing Theo to get out of the cartridge and escape TASCorp via a link on Sofia's phone. Theo reluctantly allows Belle to control him to beat the game. Back at the show match, Lucks explains Hidden Heroes usually pits two heroes against ten minions, but for the show match, Tari and Evelyn will face fifty minions. Lamar and Masa enter as two of the minions, intending to stall the game for as long as possible. Evelyn continuously complains about Tari's tactics while Lamar and Masa take out several of their teammates. Tari asks why Evelyn hates her so much, and Evelyn explains that she trained for years only for Tari to show up and "ruin" it for her. Tari angrily expresses her wish for Evelyn and TASCorp to leave her alone, and Evelyn immediately abandons Tari, who has to face several enemies on her own.
17	7	"Friendly Fire"	Luke Lerdwichagul	Jasmine Yang	Luke Lerdwichagul, Matthew Peckham, and Jarrad Rumble	27 November 2020
Tari is able to take out all the enemies with Masa's assistance. They notice Evelyn watching them, and Evelyn calls Lucks to tell him that Tari is conspiring with the enemy team. Meanwhile, Belle tries to complete the glitched Ultra Jump Mania game but is stuck on a level due to the server download amplifying the corruption. Theo then sees the purple glow from before going through the level and copies its movement to make it to the flag area by clipping through a wall. Back with Evelyn, she says Tari cheating explains the power outage, Tari's weird tactics, and the friendly fire on the enemy team. Lucks then realizes MD-5 is at the match. Lucks attempts to activate security measures to stop MD-5, but is stopped by Sofia, who passes herself off as tech support at first. This does not faze Lucks, but Sofia threatens to make TASCorp go bankrupt by exposing their secrets, aided by the rumors already swirling about them. Lucks makes hand signals to Evelyn in her pod to defeat Tari in the game. Evelyn hits Tari from behind with her sword and engages her in one-on-one combat. Masa and Lamar deal with the rest of the players since Tari is sticking to the plan of keeping Evelyn busy. Tari tries to convince Evelyn to back down, but Evelyn instead targets everyone else on the enemy team to end the game sooner, eliminating Masa in the process. Tari rescues Lamar, who asks Masa what he's going to do next; Masa says he is getting ready for when this is all over.
18	8	"Soft Lock"	Luke Lerdwichagul	Jasmine Yang	Luke Lerdwichagul, Matthew Peckham, and Jarrad Rumble	4 December 2020
Evelyn covers the arena with fog, wipes out the other enemies, stuns Lamar, and tries to take out Tari. However, Tari manages to defeat Evelyn with help from the same purple glow that helped Theo. Just as Evelyn is defeated, Sofia's download of the server data finishes. Sofia gets on the intercom and starts an emergency evacuation, while Masa tells Lamar to get Tari to safety while he causes a distraction. Masa tackles Lucks, while an enraged Evelyn physically fights Tari, who pushes Evelyn into her pod, locking her in with Sofia's help. Tari gets the cartridge and leaves with Lamar, despite her concern about Theo not being there, while Masa is subdued by TASCorp scientists. Masa wakes up in a TASCorp holding van with Lucks and Belle, who was found by TASCorp. Belle calls out Lucks for lying to her about Lucinia for a year and a half, but Lucks says that everything he did was to protect the company. Belle apologises to Masa for not believing him when he first turned on Lucks, and they have a flashback to the night before Lucinia's disappearance, in which Lucinia expresses doubt in her abilities since the attention at the time was on Masa (the leader) and Belle (the new hotshot). Meanwhile, Lamar takes Tari to Sofia for a reunion, and Tari and Lamar explain they cannot release the server data since Theo and Masa did not make it out. Tari then comes up with a plan in which they either win big or lose everything, to which Lamar and Sofia agree.
19	9	"Nightmare Mode"	Luke Lerdwichagul	Jasmine Yang	Luke Lerdwichagul, Matthew Peckham, and Jarrad Rumble	11 December 2020
Sofia calls Lucks to threaten that she will release the server data; Lucks tracks her location and intercepts her. Lucks scans the Hidden Heroes cartridge and finds no abnormalities, realising it was the cartridge Lamar stole from the show match being used as a decoy, but discovers that Tari has used the other cartridge to warp into the server and get Theo out herself. Lucks takes Sofia into the van with Masa and Belle and begins driving back to TASCorp to reboot the server and stop Tari. Meanwhile, Tari and Theo traverse Ultra Jump Mania's final level, trying to use the glitches to their advantage and reach the end before Lucks reboots the server. Lucks calls Evelyn (still trapped in her pod) to offer a rematch. Tari and Theo see the final flag to complete the game, but are stopped by Evelyn, who takes the form of a massive monster known as the Glitchemoth and puts the flag out of their reach. She activates an infinite lives cheat and takes out Tari and Theo repeatedly until they each only have one life left. Tari comes up with a plan and uses the glitches to obtain a pineapple hammer like the one she used previously (see 1x02 "Out of Bounds"), resuming her battle with Evelyn.
20	10	"Fatal Error"	Luke Lerdwichagul	Jasmine Yang	Luke Lerdwichagul, Matthew Peckham, and Jarrad Rumble	18 December 2020
By exploiting the game's glitches and working together, Tari and Theo eventually manage to incapacitate Evelyn and reach the flag, thus beating the game. Theo escapes the cartridge, but Tari is visited by the purple glow, which reveals itself to be Lucinia, and she tells Tari about her past. Back in the real world, with both Tari and Theo in Lamar's car, Lamar rams into the side of TASCorp's van, but is less successful than the last time he did so as they have upgraded their vans. Lucks holds Masa at gunpoint and demands that Tari give him the cartridge, but the data has already been released to the public, and an arrest warrant has been issued for Lucks. Masa fights Lucks and takes his gun, saying everyone will now know that Lucks is responsible for Lucinia's death. However, Lucks reveals that Lucinia is still alive, the explosion having only injured her. He explains that she entered a coma and was unable to recover due to parts of her consciousness being missing, having been lost to the server or merged into the AI that Sheridan was developing. He reveals that Tari herself is that AI in an artificial body, which she confirms, having learned this from the remnants of Lucinia that were in the server. After fusing with part of Lucinia, it gave Tari the ability to live as a human, although she still didn’t know how she ended up in her body. Thus, the only way to revive Lucinia would be for Tari to give up her life. However, the group still blames Lucks for everything he has done and tell Tari they value who she is now. After Masa considers shooting Lucks, the others convince him not to, but his Meta Runner arm is suddenly hacked and shoots at Lucks. Belle stays with Masa and urges the others to run, but they are offered a ride by Marco. In a post-credits scene, Evelyn is returning home when she receives a call from a man offering her Tari's abilities and an opportunity for revenge. When Evelyn questions the man, he responds that it is easy to hack into Meta Runner arms if one knows what they are doing, having hacked Masa's arm earlier, and reveals himself to be Sheridan, having survived the explosion in the lab.

=== Season 3: The Final Season (2022) ===
No. overall	No. in season	Title	Written by	Storyboarded by	Original release date
21	1	"Power Down"	Jasmine Yang	Jarrad Rumble	22 July 2022
A week after the events of Season 2, Tari, Lamar, Sofia, and Theo are being held captive by Marco and his crew. Still bitter about Masa cheating him out of a Meta Runner arm, Marco challenges the group to a fair and honest match of Turbo Crash 9, and if they win, they can go free. Meanwhile, Sheridan kidnaps Masa and Belle while they're en route to jail and warps their minds into his personal server, where he has an AI version of Lucks as a minion. Sheridan reveals to Masa that he hijacked his Meta Runner arm with a control bug to kill Lucks, to Masa's fury. Sheridan asks them to be a part of his new Meta Runner team, but they refuse, angering Sheridan. In Marco's hideout, Tari tries to warp into the match, but Evelyn, under Sheridan's orders, intercepts her and forces her into a digital lab where Lucinia lies unconscious. Sheridan reveals that, now with Lucks dead, Tari has served her purpose, and he begins performing surgery on Tari to get the data fragments of Lucinia's consciousness out and revive Lucinia, while Masa and Belle are forced to watch.
22	2	"Testing Room"	Jasmine Yang	Jarrad Rumble	29 July 2022
Theo is warped into Sheridan's server and makes his way to Tari, being spotted by Masa and Belle. Masa and Belle try to communicate with Theo, but he is unable to hear them due to Sheridan placing them in a soundproof room. Sheridan catches them talking, so Masa and Belle distract him by telling him they want to join his Meta Runner team. Theo manages to escape with Tari, but Sheridan has Evelyn chase Tari down and gives her a knife that will collect data fragments from Tari to complete the surgery. In Marco's hideout, Marco stops his match with MD-5 due to Tari and Theo's absence. Hesitantly, Marco allows Sofia to try and find them. Tari and Theo fight Evelyn in a room full of motionless 3D models of Meta Runners, including Lamar. Sofia is able to open a gateway for Tari and Theo to escape through. Though Tari throws Theo to safety, some of her data is extracted by Evelyn, and she falls out of the gateway and gets warped into an MMO game called Skybreakers, where a pirate character called Petey introduces her to Shipwreck Swamp, the starting area. Due to Evelyn stabbing her and extracting data, Tari passes out. Moments later, Evelyn arrives in Skybreakers in a mechanical suit.
23	3	"Skybreakers"	Jasmine Yang	Jarrad Rumble	5 August 2022
Tari wakes up to find that Petey has bandaged her up. He forces her to complete his tutorial for the game, but her skill is impaired due to her lost data. Evelyn confronts Tari at the end of the tutorial, but Tari defeats her with help from Petey, followed by help from Lamar, Theo, and Marco (though Marco is only helping because the others told him he could get revenge on Masa), with Sofia assisting from outside the game. Meanwhile, Sheridan trains Masa and Belle by having them play Battle Blaze against an emotionless Lucinia, who is awake thanks to Tari's data transfer but brainwashed. Belle's emotions over missing Lucinia, as well as Masa's anger over what Sheridan is doing to her, get the better of the two. Sheridan prepares for his master plan, which involves control bugs.
24	4	"Dead on Arrival"	Jasmine Yang	Jarrad Rumble	12 August 2022
Tari continues to struggle in Skybreakers and is annoyed by Marco's patronising attitude towards her. The group arrives at the hub city of Vagabonds Landing, where players are unable to attack each other, in order to get better gear. Evelyn re-enters the game with Lucinia, using hacks allowing them to attack the other players while in the city. Lucinia battles Tari, but she briefly stops upon recognizing Sofia's voice, allowing Tari to take her knife and use it to get back the data fragments. Tari and her friends end up escaping on a stolen ship. Marco, seeing Tari's true skill, names her the captain of their ship, which Tari calls "the Bluejay". Meanwhile, Sheridan has used the bugs to take control of Belle and Masa's minds, and he ominously asks which of them wants to go through their employee induction first as members of "SherCorp".
25	5	"Death Warp"	Jasmine Yang	Jarrad Rumble	19 August 2022
Tari and her friends discover a way to reach Sheridan's server through a virtual backdoor and they explore the dungeon Scrapbeard's Fortress in search of it. Meanwhile, Sheridan uses the control bugs to brainwash Masa and Belle to serve him after showing the former mental images reminding him of his guilt and trauma. Tari's group encounters a boss and must perform a death warp exploit in which they die at the exact same moment the boss does to go out of bounds. Meanwhile, Lamar goes back to fight Evelyn and keep her busy. During their battle, Evelyn taunts Lamar over not being able to make it in the big leagues, but Lamar admits he never wanted to, knowing what TASCorp did to runners when they no longer saw them as useful. Tari, Theo, and Marco pull off the exploit successfully, but Evelyn defeats Lamar and warps him into Sheridan's server. He ends up in the room where his model was being kept along with many other Meta Runners that Evelyn and Lucinia had defeated in Skybreakers. Sheridan appears with Masa and Belle, who are completely under his control.
26	6	"Global Testfire"	Jasmine Yang	Jarrad Rumble	26 August 2022
Sheridan introduces his remote warping technology to warp Meta Runners into his server against their will. He intends to test it by forcing the Meta Runners already there to attack each other with an assortment of video game items. Tari and Theo search for the gateway to the server in a largely empty beta level in Skybreakers, and Theo tries to hide that his still unsolved glitching problem is getting worse. The brainwashed Masa and Belle enter Skybreakers to join Evelyn and Lucinia, but Lamar covertly follows them. Sheridan activates his global warp technology, warping every Meta Runner in the world into his server (except Marco, who is unaffected due to having built his arms from scratch without any corporate tech). Sheridan also reveals that he was the true inventor of the Meta Runner arm and Lucks took credit for his creation. After Theo sails through a storm to reach the gateway to the server, Tari realises he is glitching again, much to her concern, and Theo admits he didn't tell anyone because he wanted to have fun with his friends and not have them worry about him. Evelyn's team catches up to them, but Lamar reveals himself and the two teams destroy each other's respawn points, ready for a final battle.
27	7	"Overload"	Jasmine Yang	Jarrad Rumble	2 September 2022
Tari and her friends face off against Evelyn and the brainwashed Lucinia, Masa, and Belle. Marco is sidetracked trying to get revenge on Masa, and after getting eliminated, he goes to destroy Sheridan's server to ensure the safety of the warped Meta Runners. Meanwhile, Theo confronts Evelyn by himself to buy time for his friends. Evelyn makes Theo disintegrate by essentially squeezing him to death and gloats to a distraught Tari about it, but this brings Masa's mind back. He strangles Sheridan in the lab, who breaks free and stabs him in the neck with a screwdriver before Masa's arm explodes, causing the device hooked to Belle to stop working. Belle helps Tari defeat Evelyn once and for all, and Sofia urges Tari to revive Lucinia before Marco destroys the server. Tari jumps through the gateway with Lucinia in pursuit. In a post-credits scene, Lamar gets enjoyment out of throwing rocks at Evelyn's armor after respawning back in Shipwreck Swamp.
28	8	"The End"	Jasmine Yang	Jarrad Rumble	9 September 2022
Sheridan recovers and is about to stab Masa with a knife when he realises Tari has made it into his server. Tari is forced to fight Lucinia as she attempts to bring her back to Sheridan's virtual lab. Sheridan and Sofia fight for control over the server, assisting Lucinia and Tari respectively by providing various video game items for them to use. Though Sheridan seemingly gets the upper hand, Tari manages to reach the lab with the help of Sofia. Sheridan tries to freeze Tari in place, but Sofia reveals she has tracked Sheridan's location and given it to Marco, who is arriving now, forcing Sheridan's attention away. Tari decides to use the machine in the lab to sacrifice herself and restore Lucinia's consciousness, bidding a final goodbye to Sofia. Marco bursts into Sheridan's hideout and hooks Sheridan's own control bugs to his body, electrocuting Sheridan to death and destroying his server, thus freeing the Meta Runners. Sheridan's Lucks AI hints to Tari that she might be able to restore Theo before being deleted with the server, and after telling Lucinia to say thanks and goodbye to her friends, Tari performs the surgery just in time before the server is fully destroyed. Belle, Masa, and Lucinia all wake up and are happily reunited, with Lucinia and Belle sharing a kiss. Marco forgives Masa for his debt, as Masa has already lost his Meta Runner arm again, and the group leaves. Evelyn is arrested for her crimes and Masa's murder charge is dropped. Marco's workers repair Masa's Meta Runner arm, and Marco holds onto it for safekeeping, looking forward to a true rematch with Masa in the future. Sofia, Lamar, Masa, Belle, and Lucinia all return to the MD-5 hideout, where they mourn the losses of Tari and Theo. Masa places a picture of Tari and Theo, as well as Tari's hoodie and Theo's newly acquired cartridge courtesy of Belle, in the hideout, praising Tari for keeping MD-5 together. Sofia then eagerly takes Belle and Lucinia to their "initiation" into MD-5, to Belle's annoyance and the others' amusement. Tari and Theo are preserved in fragments of the old server, and Tari has taken everything she could from the server so that she and Theo can live happily and in peace together within, as they are too unstable to exist in the real world anymore. The series ends with Tari thanking her old friends for the adventure before she and Theo run off to play video games together.

== Background and production ==
Meta Runner was created by brothers Kevin and Luke Lerdwichagul, who were known for their work on the web series SMG4, created by Luke Lerdwichagul in 2011, as a Super Mario blooper channel. According to the Southern Courier, 14 full-time staff were working at Glitch Productions in August 2019, while Kotaku reported in July 2019 that eight staff worked on Meta Runner full-time.

The series protagonist, Tari, was created for SMG4 as an original character. On 14 February 2019, a video titled "The Making of Tari" was released on the series' YouTube channel, where Kevin and Luke discussed the basis for the character. The brothers asked their younger sister, Tish, for ideas for a new character to add to their series, in which she drew a "gamer girl" character who would become Tari. The first early design of Tari was for her to be a robot instead of a cyborg, an antenna on top of her head, headphones, a simple jacket with a love heart stitched onto it, and a d-pad for her right eye. Eventually, Tari was redesigned as a human cyborg with a white vest with the Meta Runner emblem, which was based on the blue jay's wing. She was also given a blue hoodie with blue jay wing patterns on each shoulder, starting from "Sequence Break" (episode 4).

On 25 August 2018, an episode titled "Mario the Ultimate Gamer" was released on the SMG4 YouTube channel, introducing Tari who eventually became a recurring character throughout the series' run. Meta Runner was first teased at the end of the episode, "War of the Fat Italians 2018", depicting the character Theo and the date 5 December 2018. The months following had similar teasers of different Meta Runner arms before the official trailer for Meta Runner was uploaded on 5 December 2018.

On 18 March 2019, it was announced that Meta Runner was one of many projects to receive funding from a $500,000 grant from Unreal Engine. On 25 June 2019, it was announced that Meta Runner would be funded by Screen Australia, Epic Games, and AMD. On 20 July 2019, Glitch Productions announced that they had partnered with Crunchyroll to produce the series. On 20 April 2020, Screen Australia announced the funding of Meta Runner season 2. The second season aired from 16 October to 18 December 2020.

A third season was announced by co-creator Luke Lerdwichagul a few weeks before season 2 was completed, before being formally announced on 29 November 2021. A teaser trailer was released on 6 May 2022. The teaser confirmed that the third season will be the final season and will be released the summer of the same year.

On 24 June 2022, the official trailer for season 3 was released, confirming it would begin on 22 July 2022. It ended on 9 September 2022.

In an "ask me anything"-type Reddit post for season 3, it was stated that three spin-offs of the series had been written and designed: a series set before Meta Runner, a sequel series set five years after Meta Runner, and a "Meta Runner School" spin-off with a new cast of characters.

== Comic ==
After the finale on 9 September 2022, a comic series, entitled Meta Runner: Source was announced, appearing to go through the backstory of Lucinia Porter. It was also promoted through a pre-video announcement for the third episode of SMG4's "Lawsuit Arc", "SMG4: If Mario Was In... Splatoon 3", released on 10 September. A trailer dedicated to the comic was released on 11 September on the GLITCH channel.
