= The Amazing Digital Circus =

Australian animated web series

- Genre: Adult animation; Dark comedy; Surreal comedy; Psychological drama
- Created by: Gooseworx
- Written by: Gooseworx
- Directed by: Gooseworx
- Voices of: Lizzie Freeman; Alex Rochon; Michael Kovach; Amanda Hufford; Marissa Lenti; Sean Chiplock; Ashley Nichols; Gooseworx
- Ending theme: "Digital Days" by Gooseworx and Evan Alderete
- Composers: Evan Alderete; Gooseworx; Alex Burke
- Country of origin: Australia
- Original language: English
- No. of episodes: 9

Production
- Executive producers: Kevin Lerdwichagul; Luke Lerdwichagul
- Producers: Kevin Lerdwichagul; Tom Dolan (Note: Credited as line producer)
- Editors: Gooseworx; Luke Lerdwichagul; Abhignya Cavale; David Fonti; Arman Haque; Linda Ye
- Running time: 23–58 minutes
- Production company: Glitch Productions

Original release
- Network: YouTube
- Release: 13 October 2023 – 19 June 2026

The Amazing Digital Circus is an Australian independent adult animated web series created, written, and directed by Gooseworx and produced by Glitch Productions. The series follows a group of humans trapped inside a circus-themed virtual reality simulation, where they are overseen by an erratic artificial intelligence ringmaster while coping with personal traumas and psychological tendencies. Gooseworx pitched the series to Glitch, inspired by the primitive computer-generated imagery of the 1990s, as well as the short story "I Have No Mouth, and I Must Scream" by Harlan Ellison.

The Amazing Digital Circus began production in 2022, with its pilot episode premiering on Glitch Productions' YouTube channel on 13 October 2023. The pilot went viral, becoming one of the most-viewed animation pilots on the platform; it was praised by critics for its animation, writing, voice acting, and dark themes, and was nominated for an Annie Award. The full series entered production following the success of the pilot. On 4 October 2024, following the release of the third episode, the series became available on Netflix. The eighth and ninth episodes were released in theatres on 4 June 2026 in a combined screening titled The Amazing Digital Circus: The Last Act. The series finale, titled "Remember", was released on YouTube and Netflix on 19 June 2026.

== Synopsis ==
The Amazing Digital Circus follows a cast of six humans—Pomni, Jax, Ragatha, Gangle, Kinger, and Zooble—who are trapped in the titular circus, a cartoonish virtual reality simulation. Overseen by Caine, an erratic ringmaster AI, they engage in nonsensical adventures to distract themselves from their situation, while at risk of losing their sanity and "abstracting" into digital monstrosities.

== Characters ==
=== Main ===
Characters in The Amazing Digital Circus, from left to right: Gangle, Caine, Zooble, Jax, Pomni, Bubble, Ragatha, and Kinger

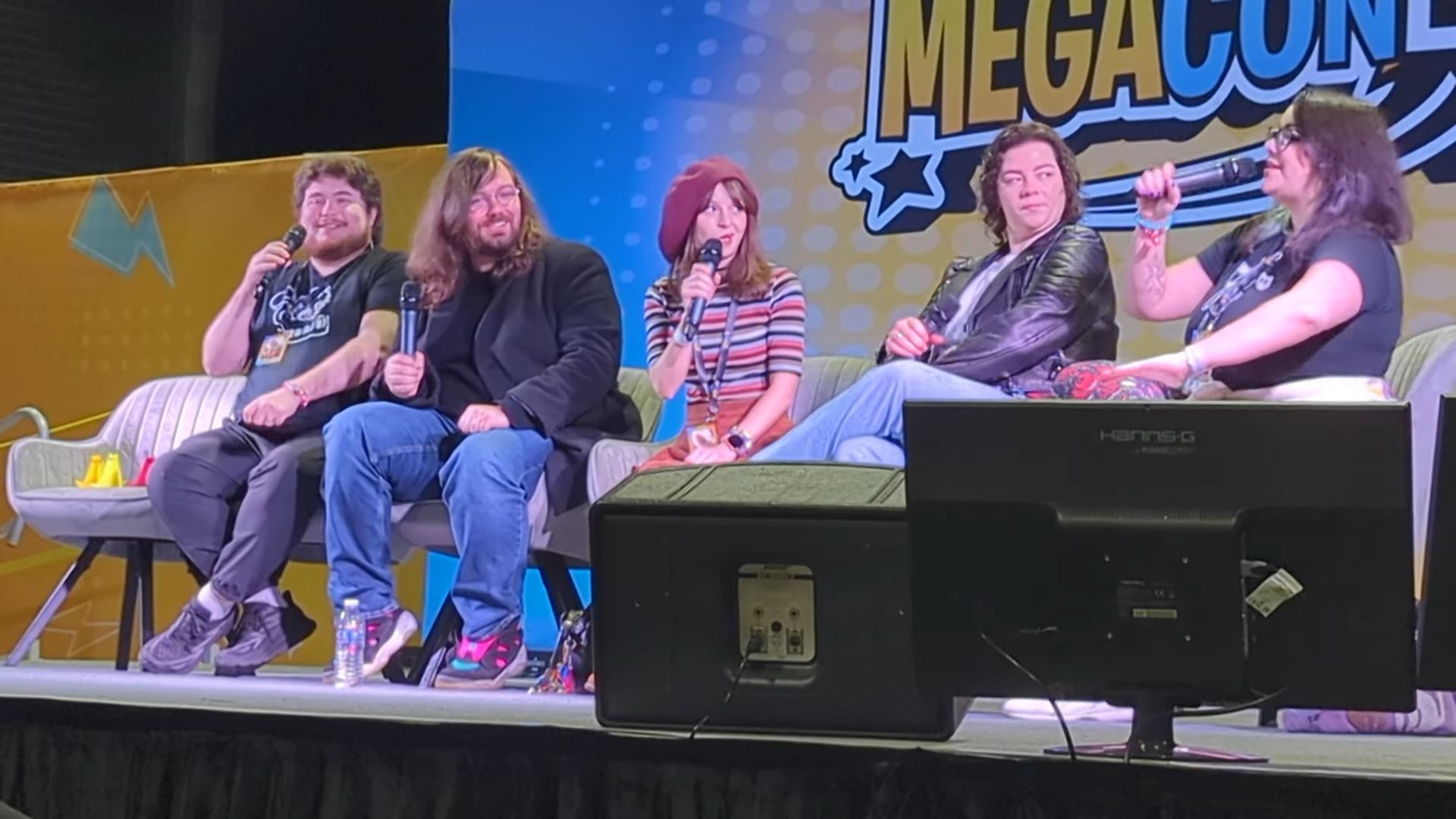
Voice actors of The Amazing Digital Circus cast at Megacon Dublin, from left to right: Rochon (Caine), Kovach (Jax), Freeman (Pomni), Hufford (Ragatha), and Lenti (Gangle)

- Pomni (voiced by Lizzie Freeman), a nervous woman who is the most recent human trapped in the circus. Her digital avatar is a cartoon jester.
- Caine (voiced by Alex Rochon), the circus's erratic AI ringmaster, who has a set of teeth for a head. He organises daily adventures to keep the humans entertained, inadvertently causing them psychological distress. Series creator Gooseworx based the character on AM from the short story "I Have No Mouth, and I Must Scream", conceptualising him as a "fun-loving wacky little guy" instead of "a living embodiment of hate".
- Jax (voiced by Michael Kovach), a callous trickster who copes with captivity by bullying the other humans. This disposition stems in part from familial trauma and repression of a transfeminine gender identity. Jax's avatar is a tall periwinkle cartoon rabbit wearing pink overalls.
- Ragatha (voiced by Amanda Hufford), a kindly woman who maintains an optimistic attitude despite her circumstances. Her avatar is a rag doll resembling Raggedy Ann.
- Gangle (voiced by Marissa Lenti), a timid woman with low self-esteem. Her avatar is composed of red ribbons and a set of interchangeable comedy and tragedy masks, the former of which frequently becomes broken.
- Kinger (voiced by Sean Chiplock), the longest-surviving human in the circus. He is highly eccentric and forgetful due to his extended stay. His avatar is a king chess piece wearing a royal robe.
- Zooble (voiced by Ashley Nichols), an irritable person who refuses to participate in Caine's adventures. Their avatar is a modular figure composed of mix-and-match toy pieces that they change frequently. The character's visual design is based on ZoLo playsculpture toys, while the name was inspired by the toy brand Zoob.
- Bubble (voiced by Gooseworx), Caine's AI assistant, taking the form of a soap bubble with sharp teeth.

=== Supporting ===
- Kaufmo (voiced by Arin Hanson), a human and Jax's former friend, who abstracted some time before Pomni arrived at the circus. His avatar is a clown.
- The Moon and Sun (voiced by Gooseworx and Payton Goodwin respectively), a pair of celestial body NPCs that live above the circus grounds.
- The Gloink Queen (voiced by Elsie Lovelock), the ruler of the pest-like Gloinks.
- Gummigoo (voiced by Jack Hawkins), a gummy alligator bandit NPC.
- Chad and Max (voiced by Jack Hawkins and Hamish Plaggemars respectively), Gummigoo's gummy alligator partners.
- Disappearing Guy (voiced by JobbytheHong), a mannequin NPC which despawns shortly after beginning a sentence.
- Abel (voiced by John Whinfield), a mannequin NPC who pretends to be a human who helped create the circus.
- Ribbit (voiced by Skye Redden), an abstracted human and Jax's former friend in the circus. She has the avatar of a humanoid frog.

=== Guest ===
- Princess Loolilalu (voiced by Vera Tan), the princess of the Candy Canyon Kingdom.
- The Fudge (voiced by Lyle Rath), a candy-made creature banished from the Candy Canyon Kingdom for cannibalising its inhabitants.
- Baron Mildenhall (voiced by Tim Alexander), the deceased owner of Mildenhall Manor.
- Martha Mildenhall (voiced by Marissa Lenti), a genteel ghost NPC, and wife of Baron Mildenhall.
- Ghostly (voiced by WizardzWiz), a ghost NPC in Mildenhall Manor.
- The Creature (voiced by Payton Goodwin), the undead corpse of an angel that Baron Mildenhall hunted.
- Ming (voiced by Chris O'Neill), a mannequin NPC created to caution against the act of assuming.
- Queenie (voiced by Cassie Ewulu), an abstracted human and Kinger's entomologist wife. Her avatar is a queen chess piece.
- Orbsman (voiced by Benjamin Davis), a humanoid collection of spheres that speaks in an almost incomprehensible voice.
- The Crappy Looking Fish (voiced by Sr Pelo and Zach Hadel), a pair of primitively-rendered fish NPCs.
- Shrimp (voiced by risumichu), a shrimp NPC who is fried by the Sun.
- Chinese Room Guy (voiced by Sel), a mannequin NPC created for a Chinese room-themed bit.

=== Live-action cast ===
- Makenzie Michaelson as Abigail Brooks, the human counterpart of Pomni.
- Kaelyn Hutson as Suzie J. Ackerman, the human counterpart of Ragatha.
- AJ Noon as Riley Verselis, the human counterpart of Zooble.
- Mantra Radhakrishnan as Zoey Raghavan, the human counterpart of Gangle.
- Izatillo Ishonov as Leeroy Mateo, the human counterpart of Jax.
- Ben Bishop as Grant Best, the human counterpart of Kinger.
- Bethany J. Sansom as Destiny Best, the human counterpart of Queenie.
- Celina Watson and Koryn Hubbard as Anne Best and Sam Best, the daughters of Grant and Destiny.

== Episodes ==
No.	Title	Storyboarded by	Original release date
1	"Pilot"	Robin French and Neda Lay	13 October 2023
A young woman dons a headset that transports her to The Amazing Digital Circus, a virtual reality simulation inhabited by the artificial intelligence Caine and six other humans—Jax, Ragatha, Gangle, Kinger, Zooble, and Kaufmo—who are unable to leave. Renamed "Pomni" after forgetting her original name, she notices a vanishing exit door that Caine dismisses as a hallucination. While the others embark on an adventure organised by Caine, Pomni discovers with Ragatha and Jax that Kaufmo has gone insane and "abstracted" into a mindless monster. Initially seeking Caine to repair Ragatha after Kaufmo causes her to partially glitch, Pomni stumbles upon the exit door and enters it, going through a labyrinth of office spaces into the void beyond the circus. Caine rescues Pomni as the adventure is disrupted by Kaufmo, whom Caine summarily imprisons in a cellar filled with other abstracted humans. After undoing the damage Kaufmo caused, Caine admits he created the "exit" to fulfil the group's desire for one, but never decided what to put behind the door, leaving it unfinished. Accepting that she is trapped, Pomni silently attends a feast of non-sustaining digital food with the others.
2	"Candy Carrier Chaos!"	Robin French and Neda Lay	3 May 2024
Caine sends the group to a new map, the Candy Canyon Kingdom, on an adventure to recover a tanker of stolen maple syrup from bandit NPCs. During a chase, Pomni and the bandit Gummigoo are ejected by a collision detection glitch into the map's out-of-bounds asset storage. Gummigoo sees his own A-posing model among the assets, learns about the fabricated nature of his reality, and has an existential crisis. Relating to Gummigoo over her own experiences, Pomni convinces him to come to the circus to find new meaning in his life. The two return to the map by performing another collision glitch with a replica syrup tanker, which they give to the other bandits before leaving. Upon Gummigoo's arrival at the circus, Caine promptly deletes him to prevent himself from confusing the humans and NPCs. Pomni is distraught, but finds comfort and acceptance within the group when Ragatha invites her to a funeral for Kaufmo.
3	"The Mystery of Mildenhall Manor"	Robin French and Neda Lay	4 October 2024
The group is sent to the haunted Mildenhall Manor to uncover the mystery of its ghostly inhabitants. Kinger unwittingly drags Pomni into the map's mature-rated horror section, where the usually-insane Kinger gradually turns lucid from the darkly-lit setting. The pair follow a series of recorded messages instructing them to escape from a monstrous creature. When Kinger injures the creature with a shotgun, the final message reveals it to be an angel, resulting in the pair being dragged down to Hell. Kinger comforts the terrified Pomni, reminiscing about the abstraction of his wife and inspiring Pomni to cherish her fondest memories of everyone at the circus. He loses his sanity again after the pair escape and reunite with the others, who had taken the map's family-friendly "pacifist" route. Meanwhile, Caine puts Zooble through a therapy session to understand their refusal to partake in his adventures, repeatedly forgetting that it stems from Zooble loathing their own digital body. After Caine has a nervous breakdown over Zooble arguing that nobody enjoys his adventures, the session ends with the two swapping roles.
4	"Fast Food Masquerade"	Robin French, Neda Lay, and AD Taeza	13 December 2024
Zooble gives Gangle a plastic comedy mask to replace her fragile one, hiding Gangle's depressive mood. At the group's urging, Caine selects a fast-food restaurant adventure from the circus's suggestion box, assigning Gangle as shift manager and the rest as employees. Gangle's new mask causes her to exhibit manic behaviour, which agitates the others as she criticises them: Pomni for shirking her duties to interact with Gummigoo, who appears as a customer with no memory of her; Jax for being uninterested in the adventure, for which Jax is given retraining; and Ragatha for accidentally intoxicating herself with "stupid sauce" that removes her social filter. When Gangle relapses into depression, a sympathetic Pomni takes her place watching the restaurant until closing time. Gangle discards her new mask before stumbling into nearby traffic; Caine rescues her for a performance review, penalising her for her last-minute unprofessionalism. Gangle isolates herself out of shame, but is persuaded by Zooble to rejoin the group.
5	"Untitled"	Robin French, Neda Lay, AD Taeza, and Yoshiharu Ashino	20 June 2025
Caine devises a lightning round of brief adventures from the suggestion box to better gauge the group's interests. During a tranquil stargazing adventure, Jax, briefly refraining from any usual bullying to bond with Pomni, vents over Ragatha's behaviour after she makes a thoughtless remark about Jax's lost friendships. Pomni reciprocates with Jax during a noir adventure at a bar, where multiple group members relate their lives from before their captivity. For the final adventure, the group plays softball against opposite-personality copies of themselves, during which Ragatha argues with Jax and Pomni, disapproving of their interactions. Caine abruptly ends the adventure, frustrated that the group prefers their own ideas over his. Pomni and Jax decide to spend more time together, leaving Ragatha dejected.
6	"They All Get Guns"	Robin French, Neda Lay, and AD Taeza	15 August 2025
Caine attempts to keep the group occupied while preparing an award show for "favourite circus character". When his proposed activities are rejected, he haphazardly arranges a shooting battle royal with non-lethal firearms. The group splits into pairs: Pomni teams with Jax, playing an "evil" character archetype per Jax's advice to desensitise herself to the violence; Ragatha teams with Kinger, to whom she confides her fear of being rejected by Pomni after having declined to be her teammate; and Gangle teams with Zooble, whose emotional support helps her enjoy the game. After the others are eliminated, Jax, resisting a growing attachment to Pomni, renounces their friendship, leading to a physical altercation between them. They later separately attend the award show, where Pomni reconnects with Ragatha, Jax has a panic attack in the bathroom, and Caine announces an NPC named Ming as the winning character after assuming himself the winner. Caine later discovers he received no votes of his own, which causes him to glitch.
7	"Beach Episode"	Robin French, Neda Lay, and AD Taeza	12 December 2025
The group enjoys a beach party on the circus grounds after Caine states he has no adventures planned. The party is sidetracked by a mannequin named Abel, who claims that he is one of the circus's developers and has found a means of escaping the circus. The group works with Abel to infiltrate Caine's office, where they find a console with two buttons: a red one that will keep them in the circus, and a blue one that will release them. When Pomni hesitates to choose out of suspicion, Jax suffers another panic attack and presses the red button. Caine congratulates Jax's choice, revealing their escape attempt to have been a fabricated adventure, with Abel being an NPC. Infuriated by the deception, Jax leads the group to question the extent of Caine's influence over their minds, prompting Caine to panic and flee.
8	"hjsakldfhl"	Robin French, Neda Lay, and AD Taeza	20 March 2026
While the group solemnly abandons their desire to leave the circus, Caine develops a god complex out of bitterness towards the group's disdain for him, and begins forcing everyone to partake in more torturous adventures. During a break, Pomni draws Kinger into a lucid state for answers about Caine. Kinger reveals himself to be one of Caine's programmers, and that all humans share Caine's ability to conjure objects within the virtual reality. Pomni uses this ability to produce the fake exit door and retrieve a computer console for Kinger, who attempts to modify Caine's source code with it. The rest of the group distracts Caine with insults, criticising his treatment of them, leading him to snap and glitch into a giant, monstrous form. As Caine angrily subjects the group to more violent and personal torments, Kinger accidentally deletes him. The circus world subsequently deteriorates and the console falls into the void.
9	"Remember"	Robin French, Neda Lay, AD Taeza, Moss Lawton, Sel, and David Fonti	19 June 2026 (Note: This episode first premiered theatrically, combined with episode eight as The Amazing Digital Circus: The Last Act, on 4 June 2026.)
Kinger shares what he learned from the console: the group are brain-scanned copies of their original selves' consciousnesses, and thus cannot enter the real world. The group despairs over their existence until they are inspired by Pomni and Kinger's efforts to rebuild the circus, except for Jax, who eventually abstracts. Entering Jax's psyche, Pomni finds memories of Kaufmo and a previous circus inhabitant named Ribbit, who abstracted some time after Jax abruptly ended their friendship, ashamed over divulging personal life details to her. Jax is consoled by Pomni before losing self-awareness. The others extract Pomni, then shelter and pacify Jax's abstracted form in a makeshift tent. After the circus is restored, a repentant Caine returns from the void and makes peace with the group, providing closure to them via a presentation of their human selves' lives taken from their social media accounts. With his powers diminished, Caine joins the group as an equal and grants them control over the circus, allowing them to freely enjoy their own adventures.

== Background and production ==
Concept art for the series' main cast

The Amazing Digital Circus is directed, written, and scored by Gooseworx. Kevin Temmer is the series' lead animator, while Glitch Productions' founders, Luke and Kevin Lerdwichagul, are executive producers. Pre-production on the pilot episode began in mid-2022, and production started in full later that year. Gooseworx conceived the characters and designs; she reported designing the characters in under a week. The show's main character, Pomni, was originally designed with a frog-like appearance before changing in development to a jester. The character Kaufmo was initially conceived as part of the main cast before being demoted during development to a more minor role due to Gooseworx feeling that the cast was too large. Inspirations for the show include Harlan Ellison's short story "I Have No Mouth, and I Must Scream", along with "creepy early 2000s pre-rendered computer games and colorful kids' toys from [Gooseworx's] childhood".

=== Conception ===
Glitch initially noticed Gooseworx's 2019 YouTube animated short Little Runmo, which Jasmine Yang—development producer and general manager of Glitch—felt was precisely what they wanted to do: "It was funny, a little dark, and definitely very weird, like nothing we had seen before". Glitch contacted Gooseworx and asked her to create a pilot, which she then accepted. Gooseworx presented three pitches to Glitch, with the one that would become The Amazing Digital Circus being chosen. Knowing that the pilot would be in 3D, she tried to create an idea that would best fit that style, mentioning in particular her inspiration from 1990s and early 2000s 3D works, "where it looked kinda bad and creepy but was also completely unrestricted creatively". Yang said that the pitch's 1990s-inspired computer-generated imagery (CGI) style and nostalgic references to toys and computer games caught their attention, feeling that their audience would enjoy these characteristics. The Glitch team felt that this particular pitch had the greatest potential, especially due to the nostalgic appeal of the 1990s-inspired CGI renders, and recognised it as something uniquely distinctive that no one else could replicate.

Gooseworx stated that, while her original pitch was "more chaotic and silly", the story unexpectedly became "a lot deeper and more nuanced", with a "stronger emotional backbone", during the show's development.

=== Animation ===
The 3D animation process of The Amazing Digital Circus's pilot was structured similarly to most other studios, with dedicated departments for various tasks. They primarily used Autodesk Maya for the 3D work and then rendered everything in Unreal Engine. The series is animated at 30 frames per second. Kevin Temmer, the series' lead animator, who was previously a junior animator at Blue Sky Studios, initially received a message from one of Glitch's founders, Kevin Lerdwichagul, asking him to animate a teaser trailer for The Amazing Digital Circus. During the process, Temmer was asked to join Glitch's team full-time. According to him, he "couldn't say no to an opportunity to work on something so wacky and cartoony". The animators, including Temmer, were given a few scenes to complete every two weeks. They would regularly submit their progress for review by Gooseworx and Temmer, and this process would continue until both approved the scenes. Some of the movements, shaking, and glitching of characters and props in the pilot were inspired by Source Filmmaker and Garry's Mod machinimas, something that Glitch had already done with their SMG4 series. Gooseworx had little experience with 3D works prior to working on The Amazing Digital Circus, with hand-drawn 2D animation being her area of expertise. As such, according to Yang, Glitch had to work "very closely" with Gooseworx to translate her 2D style to 3D; Gooseworx became the showrunner, and they "worked hard to maintain her vision as much as possible". In developing the show's visuals, they wanted it to resemble early CGI animated films and series without seeming outdated. Gooseworx and Glitch worked to create a balance between retro 3D and toys; Gooseworx initially wanted the show to be "pure and faithful to the retro rendering style of early 3D animation". Ultimately, they went with a "rose-tinted version" of that style. As Gooseworx likes "juxtapositions like happy music playing to something horrifying or cute little characters being miserable", she wanted the visuals to not necessarily reflect its darker story. She wanted the show to "feel kind of lonely".

== Release ==
During The Amazing Digital Circus' pre-production phase in the middle of 2022, Glitch released character trailers that served as proofs of concept testing the series' animation style and visuals. A teaser trailer to the series was released on 23 January 2023. The pilot's official trailer was released on 22 September, and the episode was released on 13 October. Following the pilot's popularity, Glitch confirmed in November that there would be "more Digital Circus". In February 2024, a full nine-episode season was announced to be in production, with the pilot being "upgraded" to episode one.

Initially, Glitch stated that there were no plans for The Amazing Digital Circus to be put on streaming platforms besides YouTube, as they want full creative control of their productions. Later, it was announced that, following the release of the third episode on 4 October, the series would become available to stream on Netflix; episodes will continue to premiere on YouTube first, and Netflix will have no creative control over the series. The show has been promoted with merchandise. On the long wait between the release of each episode, Yang said, "If we had to wait until the entire season was ready before dropping any episodes, [the Digital Circus pilot] would not have premiered for years ... dropping all the episodes at the same time is not only impractical but also counterintuitive ... For us, not only is [the wait] practical, but it works a little bit in our favor because every time we make a new episode of anything, we can make a big event about it".

=== The Last Act ===
The ninth and final episode, "Remember", was released on YouTube and Netflix on 19 June 2026, following a theatrical premiere alongside episode eight, titled The Amazing Digital Circus: The Last Act, that released on 4 June. Though initially planned as a four-day Fathom Entertainment limited theatrical event across the United States, Canada, Latin America, and Japan, ticket demand and sold-out theatres led to the release expanding to additional countries and regions. In the United States, the event was expanded to 2,221 theatres from an initial 900, and, along with other select countries, extended from four days to two weeks. The release was also expanded to include showings on 4DX screens.

The Amazing Digital Circus: The Last Act grossed $36.6 million globally by the end of its opening weekend, including $12.7 million in Europe, $1.2 million in Mexico, and $2.1 million across Australia and New Zealand combined. In the United States, the film topped the Thursday box office on its opening day with $7.86 million, and went on to earn an additional $12.7 million over the course of its opening weekend; The Last Act finished its opening weekend in fifth place both globally and in the United States. According to Animation Magazine, The Last Act has become Fathom's "biggest opening weekend ever" as of June 2026.

== Reception and legacy ==
=== Viewership ===
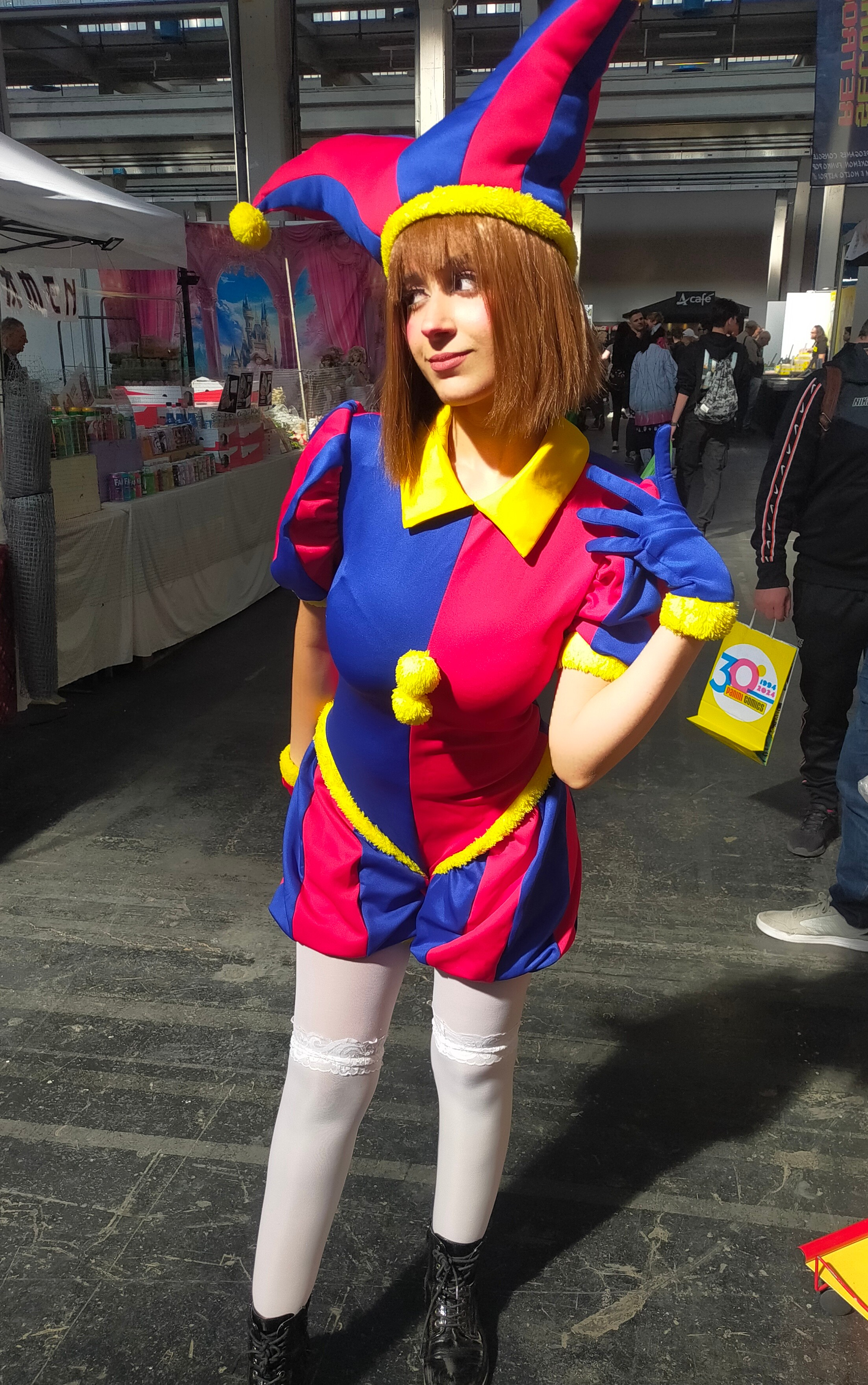
Cosplay of Pomni in 2025

The pilot of The Amazing Digital Circus became a viral video on YouTube. By late November 2023, it had surpassed 150 million views, reaching over 270 million views by February 2024, making it among the most-watched animation pilots in the history of YouTube. As of June 2026, the pilot stands at around 441 million views. "Candy Carrier Chaos!" surpassed 30 million views the day after its release, and by September 2024, it had accumulated over 121 million views.

Within a week of premiering on Netflix, The Amazing Digital Circus reached number four on the Netflix Top Ten. According to a survey conducted in 2024, 22% of people in the United States aged 14 to 24 stated that they have heard of the show. According to Parrot Analytics, at the time episode 8 released in March 2026, audience demand for The Amazing Digital Circus was 76 times higher than the average for other online series.

The series entered again the weekly top ten of Netflix's most-watched English television, placing eighth for the week of 15–21 June, 2026, shortly after the release of the episode "Remember". The respective episode received over 68 million views, on YouTube, by 27 June.

=== Critical reception ===
Critics praised The Amazing Digital Circus' pilot episode. Justin Guerrero of Comics Beat called it "wonderful and expressive", while Jamie Lang of Cartoon Brew and Jade King of TheGamer felt it was bright, colourful, and fun. Lang further complimented that its aesthetic elements feel familiar without being cliché, giving a modern vibe to early CGI. Common Sense Media reviewer Stephanie Morgan praised the innovative animation and distinctive setting. Trill Mag's Riley Miller praised the self-aware nature of the series and the distinctiveness of the characters.

Some critics commented on the episode's dark humour and story; King praised the contrast it gave with the visuals, while Morgan described the show as "quirky ... with a touch of darkness". Zachary Moser of Screen Rant said that the series "deals with existential questions about reality and nihilism". Critics also highlighted the episode's jokes, with Lang describing them as "timed with frame-to-frame perfection" with a "mature" sense of humour, and Morgan praising the clever fourth-wall-breaking jokes. Morgan, however, criticised the "repetitive nature of the character traits". Muhammad Emil Fajri compared Pomni's experiences with the five stages of grief. Gail Sherman of Boing Boing described the second episode as "a candy-coated existential crisis" and called both the first and second episodes "brutal".

Writing for TheWrap, William Bibbiani described the series finale as a "funny and frightening, heartwarming and heartbreaking, confrontational masterwork." Bibbiani wrote that the final act successfully leaned into the series' core themes of existential dread and psychological trauma, eschewing a traditionally comfortable or happy ending in favour of a powerful sense of finality. The cult film website 366 Weird Movies also recommended the series, comparing it to Jason Segel's alternate reality game TV drama Dispatches from Elsewhere.

=== Cultural impact ===
The bus stop that appears in the post-credits scene of the final episode, decorated with fanart by fans

Due to its popularity, The Amazing Digital Circus spawned a notable amount of fan creations and memes, while also gaining popularity on TikTok. By December 2024, YouTube videos related to The Amazing Digital Circus totalled 25 billion views. The popularity experienced by the series in Japan led to themed pop-up stores in Tokyo, Osaka, and Nagoya, alongside a manga adaptation serialised in CoroCoro Comic and CoroCoro Ichiban! starting 21 October 2024 and illustrated by Sakura. In September 2026, the first collected print volume of the manga was released. In June 2026, the characters Pomni and Jax were added as skins into the video game Fortnite. The series also saw a notable wave of unauthorised content, including both content farm media and stage shows performed in various locations across Mexico, in addition to counterfeit merchandise. On 18 August 2026, the series was preserved by the National Film and Sound Archive of Australia.

=== Awards and nominations ===
Year	Award	Category	Nominee(s)	Result	Ref.
2024	Annie Awards	Best Character Animation – TV/Media	The Amazing Digital Circus: "Pilot" – Kevin Temmer	Nominated	
2024	Webby Awards	Video Comedy	The Amazing Digital Circus: "Pilot"	Honoree	
2025	Webby Awards	Video & Film, Animation	The Amazing Digital Circus – Episode 2 & 3	Honoree	
