= The Closer You Get =

The Closer You Get may refer to:

- The Closer You Get (film), a 2000 British/Irish comedy film starring Ian Hart
- The Closer You Get (Six by Seven album), 2000 studio album by Six by Seven
- The Closer You Get..., 1983 album by the American band, Alabama
- "The Closer You Get" (song), 1983 single by Alabama
- "The Closer You Get", 2019 episode of the animated series Final Space
