= Caroline Hayes =

Caroline Hayes may refer to:

- Caroline C. Hayes, American computer scientist and mechanical engineer
- Caroline Hayes (actress), English stage and television actress
- Caroline Hayes, former principal of Tendring Technology College, an English secondary school

== See also ==
- Carolyn Hayes (born 1988), Irish triathlete
