= Never Mind the Full Stops =

- Presented by: Julian Fellowes
- Country of origin: United Kingdom
- Original language: English
- No. of series: 2
- No. of episodes: 22

Production
- Executive producers: Martin Scott; Katie Taylor
- Camera setup: Multi-camera
- Running time: 30 minutes

Original release
- Network: BBC Four
- Release: 11 May 2006 – 24 April 2007

Never Mind the Full Stops is a British television panel game based on the English language, its idiosyncrasies, and its misuse. It is hosted by the British actor, author and Oscar-winning screenwriter, Julian Fellowes. Each episode lasts 30 minutes. The series was filmed in March 2006 at Channel 4's studios in Horseferry Road, Westminster. It was originally broadcast on BBC Four, and aired on BBC Two from 9 October 2006.

Two teams of two people are faced with various questions and challenges concerning English grammar, spelling and usage. The show is divided into rounds, with themes such as identifying the famous author of a badly spoken sentence (John Prescott was one of those picked on in the first episode) and correcting the punctuation in a written sentence. There is also a quick-fire round with questions such as "What is a malapropism?" Points are awarded throughout the show to determine the winning team.

Each show starts with the host giving a 'difficult-to-spell' word and an example mnemonic to help remember that spelling, and by the end of the show the panellists have to have devised their own. In episode one Julian Fellowes gave the example arithmetic: A Rat In The House Might Eat The Ice Cream; and Ned Sherrin's version (which earned his team the win as the final points were tied) was: As Richard Interred The Head Master Every Tiny Infant Cheered. By the end of series 1, even Julian Fellowes had realized that these so-called mnemonics were invariably harder to remember than the spellings – particularly as they were rarely related to the words in question.

Another round featured a film of someone speaking a very obscure UK dialect (often on the verge of extinction), and the teams would have to try to guess what had been said.

The programme's name is derived from that of the long-running pop music panel game Never Mind the Buzzcocks, which is itself taken from the title of the Sex Pistols album, Never Mind the Bollocks.

== Episode list ==
=== Series 1 (2006) ===
No. overall	No. in series	Team to host's right	Team to host's left	Original release date
1	1	Carol Thatcher & Ned Sherrin	Janet Street-Porter & David Aaronovitch	11 May 2006
2	2	Nina Wadia & John Sergeant	Tim Brooke-Taylor & Rod Liddle	18 May 2006
3	3	Bonnie Greer & Dave Gorman	Eve Pollard & Rod Liddle	25 May 2006
4	4	Jessica Fellowes & Gyles Brandreth	Sue Carroll & Roger McGough	1 June 2006
5	5	Julia Hartley-Brewer & Hugh Dennis	Andy Zaltzman & Roger McGough	8 June 2006
6	6	Hardeep Singh Kohli & Graeme Garden	Janet Street-Porter & Lembit Opik	15 June 2006
7	7	Sue Perkins & Nicholas Parsons	Pam Ayres & Rob Deering	22 June 2006
8	8	Jilly Cooper & Paddy O'Connell	Marina Hyde & Simon Fanshawe	29 June 2006
9	9	Henry Blofeld & Sue Perkins	Daisy Goodwin & Simon Hoggart	6 July 2006
10	10	Bonnie Greer & Arthur Smith	Victoria Mailer & Rob Deering	13 July 2006
Christmas Special
11	—	TBA	TBA	28 December 2006

=== Series 2 (2007) ===
No. overall	No. in series	Team to host's right	Team to host's left	Original release date
12	1	Arthur Smith & Shappi Khorsandi	Kirsty Wark & Rob Deering	13 February 2007
13	2	Sue Perkins & David Aaronovitch	Gillian Reynolds & Robin Ince	20 February 2007
14	3	Stewart Lee & Patricia Hodge	David Nobbs & Paul Sinha	27 February 2007
15	4	Sid Waddell & Frederick Forsyth	Eve Pollard & Simon Hoggart	6 March 2007
16	5	Will Smith & Edwina Currie	Susie Dent & Lemn Sissay	13 March 2007
17	6	Phil Hammond & Shappi Khorsandi	Kirsty Wark & Mark Steel	20 March 2007
18	7	Rod Liddle & Bonnie Greer	Virginia Ironside & Ian McMillan	27 March 2007
19	8	Richard Herring & Sharon Foster	Paddy O'Connell & Vanessa Feltz	3 April 2007
20	9	Simon Hoggart & Lucy Porter	Angela Rippon & Stuart Hall	10 April 2007
21	10	Ian McMillan & Jenny Murray	Edward Stourton & Michael Rosen	17 April 2007
22	11	Paddy O'Connell & Aggie MacKenzie	Barry Norman & Jessica Fellowes	24 April 2007

== Reception ==
Reviewing the first episode of series 1, Sam Wollaston of The Guardian wrote that the show was "so bad it's impossible to understand the process by which it came to be put on air. You're left stunned, pummelling your head with your fists, shouting, 'Why?' [...] The whole thing is staggeringly amateur, like a slightly drunken and badly thought-out after-dinner-party game in Islington (I'm guessing here, promise), and in no way merits a television airing." The Times's Gabrielle Starkey described the series as a "slightly smug quiz".
