= Sheasby =

Sheasby is a surname. Notable people with the surname include:

- Chris Sheasby (born 1966), English rugby player and coach
- Dave Sheasby (1940–2010), playwright, director, and producer
- Michael Sheasby, Australian actor
- Thomas Sheasby (c.1740–1799), British civil engineer and contractor
