= Noah's Ark (British TV series) =

British television series

- Genre: Drama
- Developed by: Johnny Byrne
- Written by: Johnny Byrne; Sam Lawrence; Joe Turner
- Starring: Anton Rodgers; Peter Wingfield; Angela Thorne; Orla Brady; Kate Alderton
- Composer: Colin Towns
- Country of origin: United Kingdom
- Original language: English
- No. of series: 2
- No. of episodes: 12

Production
- Executive producer: Jonathan Powell
- Producers: Sue Bennett-Urwin; Michael Whitehall
- Production locations: Worcester, Worcestershire, England, United Kingdom
- Production companies: Whitehall Films; Carlton Television

Original release
- Network: ITV
- Release: 8 September 1997 – 23 October 1998

Noah's Ark is a British television series about a country veterinarian and his family, aired on ITV. The first series of six episodes was broadcast from 8 September to 13 October 1997. A second series, also of six episodes, aired a year later from 18 September to 23 October 1998.

== Overview ==
Noah's Ark was a family TV story of a country veterinarian, Noah Kirby, his wife Valerie, his son Tom, and his girlfriend, wildlife veterinarian Clare. Noah and Tom Kirby, father and son, are both vets.

Noah has a country practice, and is still running it much as he did when Tom was a child. He wants Tom to join the practice, but Tom has other, and bigger, ideas. He has just quit his job with a large multi-national company, and has returned home for what he intends to be a flying visit: disillusioned, but a lot richer, but his father has a car crash brought on by a dizzy spell. It is clear that he badly needs full-time help.

Tom is reluctantly drawn into helping, temporarily of course, while his father recovers, but Clare Somers, the local wildlife vet, is there.

== Cast ==
=== Main cast ===
- Peter Wingfield as Tom Kirby
- Anton Rodgers as Noah Kirby
- Angela Thorne as Val Kirby
- Orla Brady as Clare Somers
- Kate Alderton Anna Lacey
- Paul Burgess

== Episodes ==
Series	Episodes	Originally released	
Series	Episodes	First released	Last released
1	6	8 September 1997	13 October 1997
2	6	18 September 1998	23 October 1998

=== Series 1 (1997) ===
No. overall	No. in series	Title	Directed by	Written by	Original release date
1	1	"Two of a Kind"	A. J. Quinn	Johnny Byrne	8 September 1997
2	2	"Matters of Principal"	A. J. Quinn	Johnny Byrne	15 September 1997
3	3	"Paying the Price"	A. J. Quinn	Johnny Byrne	22 September 1997
4	4	"Healing Touch"	A. J. Quinn	Johnny Byrne	29 September 1997
5	5	"Live and Learn"	A. J. Quinn	Johnny Byrne	6 October 1997
6	6	"Family Matters"	A. J. Quinn	Johnny Byrne	13 October 1997

=== Series 2 (1998) ===
No. overall	No. in series	Title	Directed by	Written by	Original release date
7	1	"Free as a Bird"	A. J. Quinn	Johnny Byrne	18 September 1998
8	2	"Sitting Target"	A. J. Quinn	Sam Lawrence	25 September 1998
9	3	"Stormy Weather"	A. J. Quinn	Sam Lawrence	2 October 1998
10	4	"Old Dog, New Trick"	Paul Harrison	Joe Turner	9 October 1998
11	5	"Killing Time"	Paul Harrison	Sam Lawrence	16 October 1998
12	6	"Deep Waters"	Paul Harrison	Sam Lawrence	23 October 1998

== Production ==
Filming was done around Worcester. The surgery was at a farmhouse Bed & Breakfast opposite the Leigh & Bransford Memorial Hall about 6 miles West of Worcester. The mountains often seen in the background are the Malvern Hills.
