= Lackadaisy =

Webcomic by Tracy Butler

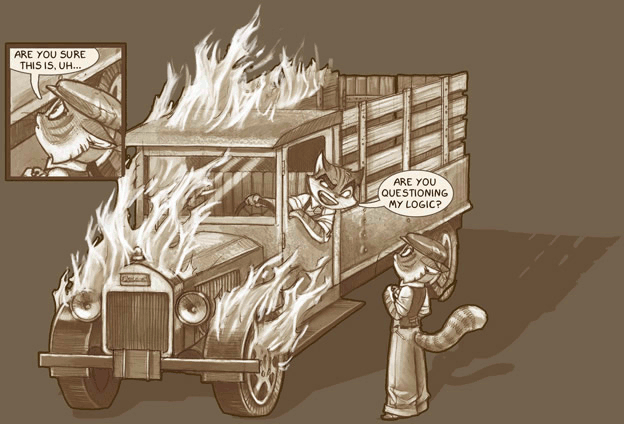
- A panel from the comic depicting Freckle McMurray and Rocky Rickaby
- Author: Tracy J. Butler
- Website: https://lackadaisy.com
- Launch date: July 19, 2006
- Alternate name: Lackadaisy Cats
- Genres: Crime; Dark comedy; Historical fiction; Mystery; Thriller
- Original language: English

Lackadaisy (also known as Lackadaisy Cats) is a webcomic created by American artist Tracy J. Butler. Set in a Prohibition-era St. Louis with a population of anthropomorphic cats, the plot chronicles the fortunes of the Lackadaisy speakeasy after its founder, Atlas May, is murdered. The comic mixes elements of comedy, crime and mystery. It won multiple Web Cartoonists' Choice Awards in 2007 and 2008, and in April 2011 it was nominated for the Eisner Award for "Best Digital Comic".

The style of the comic is highly detailed, with elegantly attired cartoon characters that resemble styles from animated films of Walt Disney and Don Bluth. The earlier strips are sepia-toned, resembling aged photographs of the 1920s era, while more recent pages can be seen fully colored, often in shades of deep blue. Launched by Butler in July 2006, the comic updates on an irregular basis, with the most recent update published in 2020.

A short film adaptation of the same name was released on YouTube on March 29, 2023. A web series following the short film is currently in production by Iron Circus and Glitch Productions, with six episodes, and Olan Rogers joining as development executive.

== Summary ==
=== Setting ===
When prohibition grips the United States in 1920, Atlas May sets his eatery, the Little Daisy Café, as the front for a successful speakeasy called the Lackadaisy. Situated at the mouth of a network of limestone caves, the speakeasy can only be accessed from the Café by those showing a pin in the shape of a Clubs card suit. With easy access to illegal alcohol and a steady clientele, business burgeons, and the Lackadaisy becomes a premier establishment.

In 1926, however, Atlas is mysteriously killed, and management of the Little Daisy and the Lackadaisy falls to his widow Mitzi. Patronage at the Lackadaisy gradually falls off, bringing it to the brink of collapse, with only a handful of its original crew remaining and doing their best to keep the business alive. There is a band that plays at the club, and one of the members is a rumrunner, which brings the characters into conflict with others who distill their own whiskey and moonshine.

=== Characters ===
Lackadaisy features a wide cast of characters, most of whom are workers for either Lackadaisy or Marigold, two rival alcohol smuggling rings. Characters employed by Lackadaisy include Roark "Rocky" Rickaby, a sporadic and cunning violinist who works for Lackadaisy as a bootlegger; Calvin "Freckle" McMurray, Rocky's cousin - a nervous, awkward and shy young man who is mentally unstable; Ivy Pepper, an energetic, cheerful worker at the Little Daisy Cafè who later develops a romantic relationship with Freckle; and Mitzi May, Atlas' widow who is in charge of the Lackadaisy speakeasy and tries everything in order to keep it alive.

Marigold employees include Mordecai Heller, a cold and curt trigger-man for Marigold who formerly worked by the Lackadaisy speakeasy, and Serafine and Nicodème "Nico" Savoy, two siblings from New Orleans who work with Mordecai.

Other significant characters include Viktor Vasko, the former partner of Mordecai, Asa Sweet, the ruler of the Marigold-gang, Atlas May, the founder of the Lackadaisy speakeasy who mysteriously died, Dorian "Zib" Zibowski, Sedgewick "Wick" Sable and Nina McMurray.

== Production ==
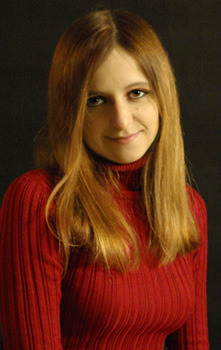
Tracy Butler, 2008

=== Background and Artist biography ===
American cartoonist Tracy J. Butler was born in 1980 in Springfield, Massachusetts. In high school, she would doodle and create characters while sitting in class. She studied biology for a year at Our Lady of the Elms College, in Massachusetts, before returning to her art. She created a website with some of her work, which led to a job offer from Simutronics, a Missouri game development company. Butler performed illustration and graphic design work before moving into 3D character design and animation.

=== Development ===
After living in St. Louis for some time, she purchased a 100-year-old house, and began researching its history, as well as that of the local neighborhood, and ultimately the history of St. Louis itself. Combined with her interest in jazz music, and the characters she had designed in school (loosely based on her own pet cats), this led to her creating Lackadaisy in July 2006. Butler also credits being promoted to a more managerial role in her job pushing her to seek a creative outlet again through the comic. An Italian print version was released in 2008, and an English version in 2009.

Butler creates the comic by pencil sketching original images, then scanning and adjusting them with software such as Photoshop, where the panels are then assembled. Lighting is then added in grey tones, sharpening where needed, and dialogue and sound effects are added in a separate layer. The sepia tones are added in the final pass. Some of the feline characters are based on Butler's own pets, Ivy and Calvin.

== Awards ==
In 2007, Lackadaisy won every award for which it was nominated in the Web Cartoonists' Choice Awards, including "Outstanding Newcomer" and "Outstanding Artist". In 2008, Lackadaisy won five Web Cartoonists' Choice Awards, including "Outstanding Artist", "Black and White Art", and "Website Design".

In 2009, the art of Lackadaisy was used on the cover of the Turkish magazine Photoshop. In 2011, Lackadaisy was nominated for an Eisner Award in the category of "Best Digital Comic", but lost to The Abominable Charles Christopher by Karl Kerschl.

== Legacy ==
The art style of Lackadaisy has been cited as an influence on other webcomics, such as Zebra Girl by Joe England, and received a mention in the Girl Genius webcomic by Phil Foglio.

=== Short film and series adaptation ===
In March 2020, it was announced that Iron Circus Comics was planning the production of an animated short film based on the webcomic, set to be directed by animator Fable Siegel. The project was crowdfunded through a Kickstarter campaign. The 27-minute short film was released on March 29, 2023, on YouTube.

After a second campaign with an original goal of $1,000,000 raised over $2 million, Iron Circus Animation announced that they would also produce a five-episode season. In October 2025, it was announced that Glitch Productions will be co-producing the series with Iron Circus and expand to six full-length episodes, with Olan Rogers joining as development executive.
