= Ian McMillan (poet) =

English poet, journalist, playwright, broadcaster (born 1956)

Ian McMillan FRSL
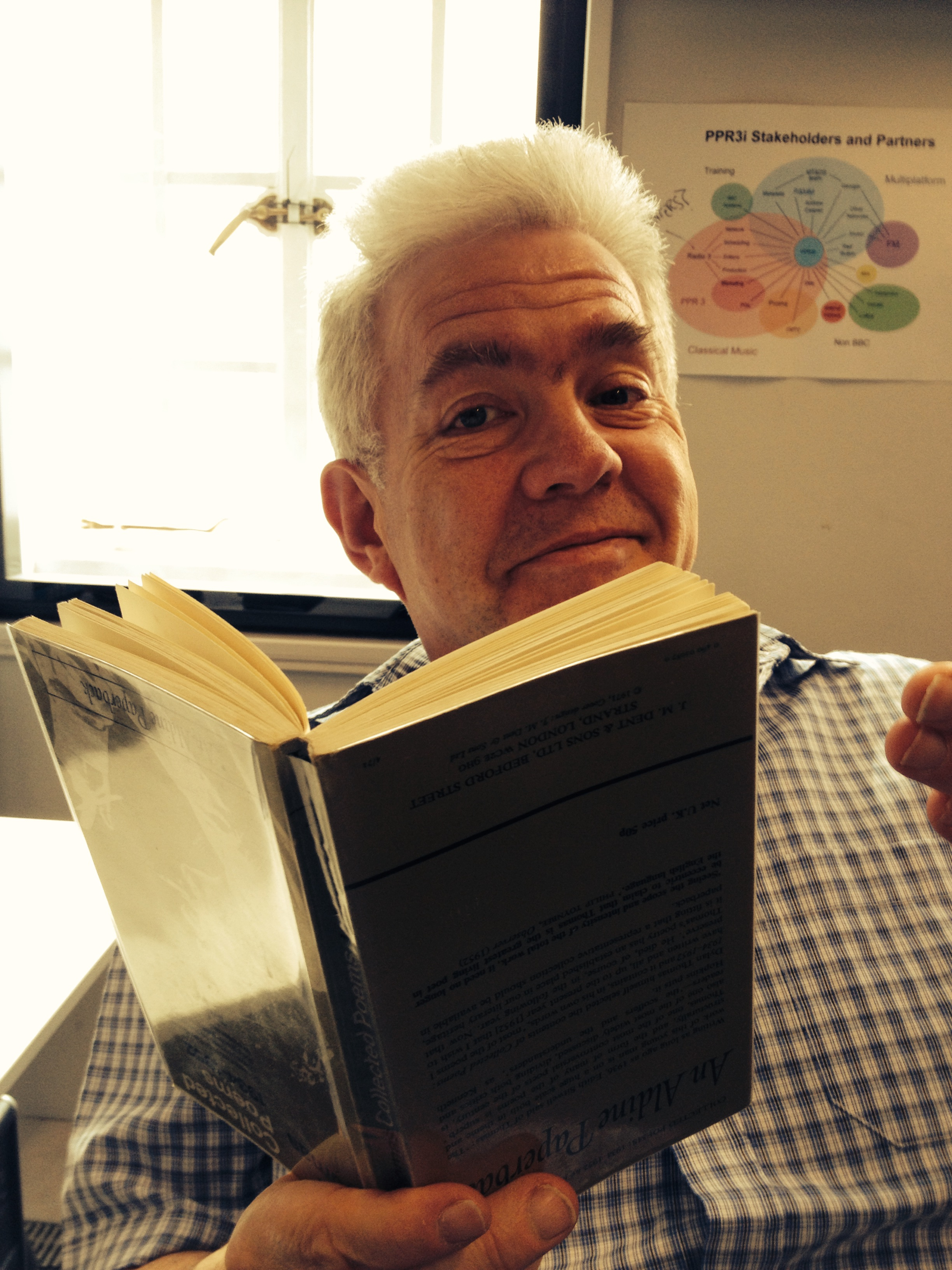
- McMillan in 2014
- Born: 21 January 1956 (age 70); Darfield, West Riding of Yorkshire, England
- Education: Low Valley Junior School, Wath Grammar School, North Staffordshire Polytechnic
- Occupations: Poet, journalist, playwright, broadcaster
- Spouse: Catherine Goldthorpe
- Children: 3, including Andrew McMillan
- Writing career
- Period: 1980–present
- Website: uktouring.org.uk/ian-mcmillan/

Ian McMillan FRSL (born 21 January 1956) is an English poet, journalist, playwright, and broadcaster. He is known for his strong and distinctive Yorkshire accent and his incisive, friendly interview style on programmes such as BBC Radio 3's The Verb.

== Background ==
McMillan was born in Darfield, South Yorkshire, son of John McMillan, a naval officer, and Olive Wood, a shop clerk. McMillan married on 21 July 1979. His son Andrew McMillan is a poet who won the Guardian First Book Award 2015 for his debut poetry book Physical.

McMillan attended Low Valley Junior School and Wath Grammar School, later graduating in Modern Studies from North Staffordshire Polytechnic in 1978. He started performing on the live poetry circuit in the 1970s. He has had several volumes of his own poetry published, for both adults and children. In his writing and broadcasting he has promoted the wider appreciation of poetry.

In addition he has had journalism published in the magazines Q and Mojo, and writes a weekly column in his home town's local newspaper, The Barnsley Chronicle. He is styled "poet in residence" to his hometown football club Barnsley F.C. His play Sister Josephine Kicks the Habit, based on the work of fellow Yorkshireman Jake Thackray, premiered in 2005. In June 2010 McMillan was appointed poet-in-residence at the English National Opera.

McMillan wrote the libretto for The Arsonists, the world's first opera written in a South Yorkshire dialect, which received its premiere on 18 November 2017.

== Personal life ==
Ian McMillan is the father of poet Andrew McMillan. He lives in Darfield, the village of his birth.

== TV and radio ==
McMillan was the host of BBC Radio 4's literary quiz Booked!, broadcast between 1995 and 2000.

McMillan hosts the weekly show The Verb and Proms variation Adverb on BBC Radio 3, "dedicated to investigating spoken words around the globe". He has been described in the BBC's publication Radio Times as the "22nd Most Powerful Person in Radio". He is also a regular roving contributor to Radio 4's Today Programme where he was at one stage dubbed as the programme's "Election Laureate". He co-wrote the Radio 4 comedy series The Blackburn Files (1989–1993) and Street and Lane with Dave Sheasby which first aired 2005–2007 and has since been repeated. During January 2007, he presented a BBC Radio 3 series on writing, Ian McMillan's Writing Lab, in which he talked to a range of authors which included Julian Barnes, Mark Ravenhill, Howard Jacobson and Michael Rosen. He has also been a panellist on BBC Radio 4's long-running game show Just A Minute.

In November 2010, McMillan was the castaway on the BBC Radio 4 show Desert Island Discs hosted by Kirsty Young. His choice of music included John Cage's silent piece "4′33″" and Andy Stewart singing "Donald Where's Your Troosers?".

He is a frequent guest on The Review Show, The Mark Radcliffe Show, the Today programme, You and Yours, The Culture Show, Never Mind the Full Stops and Have I Got News for You. He has narrated two series of The Yorkshire Dales and the Lakes on More4 (Series 3 starts on 27 May 2019), and also narrated The Museum on BBC 2 in 2007. He has also been employed to provide voice-overs in advertisements for a laundry detergent and a branded food product.

== Poetry competitions ==
McMillan is a regular judge of poetry competitions. In December 2006, McMillan judged the "Central Trains Poetry Competition" and the winners, from the Royal Grammar School Worcester, were awarded a signed copy of his poem "Take me on a Christmas Trip on Central Trains" at Birmingham Snow Hill station. He was also a judge in the Foyle Young Poets Awards 2008, and went as a teacher with the winners for a week to The Hurst, an Arvon centre in Shropshire, as part of their prize. He judged the 2009 Cardiff International Poetry Competition for the award ceremony in June.

In 2005, as "Poet Laureate" for the "Three Cities" (the "Three Cities" in this case being Nottingham, Leicester and Derby), he was involved in the "Three Cities Create and Connect scheme", which included a regional writing competition. The project resulted in a now-scarce publication, A Tale of 3 Cities : New Writing from Derby, Leicester and Nottingham. McMillan contributed a foreword and two original pieces, "Here.Now.Then" and "The Laureate Reflects" as well as co-authoring (with six regional writers) "Three Cities Chain Poem".

McMillan was elected a Fellow of the Royal Society of Literature in 2022.

== Yorkshire dialect work ==
In 2007 McMillan published a book named Collins Chelp and Chunter: a Guide to the Tyke Tongue. This was a compilation of words that are used in the Yorkshire dialect as well as a few pieces of Yorkshire humour and illustrations. In 2019 the book received a negative review in the Transactions of the Yorkshire Dialect Society, which noted that the work had an inconsistent orthography, assigned words to very specific locations when they were spread over wider areas and did not take account of the historical development of the dialect.

In celebration of the UK's 2012 National Pie Week, McMillan wrote a 'piem' devoted to the creations of the 'pie village' of Denby Dale, which has produced several world record breaking pies over the last 250 years.

== Books ==
1980

- Batteries Not Included: 36 Poems
- The Changing Problem

1982

- An Anthology from Versewagon (with John Turner and Martyn Wiley)

1983

- Now it Can be Told

1984

- How the Hornpipe Failed and Other Poems

1985

- Six: The Versewagon Poetry Manual

1986

- Tall in the Saddle

1987

- Selected Poems

1988

- More Poems Please, Waiter, and Quickly!
- Overstone (with David Harmer and Martyn Wiley)
- Unselected Poems

1990

- Against the Grain

1991

- A Chin?: Poems

1993

- Radio 5 Poems
- Yakety-Yakety-Yakety-Yak! : Poems (with Martyn Wiley)

1994

- Breathless
- Dad, the Donkey's on Fire

1996

- Primary Colours

1998

- Elephant Dreams (with Paul Cookson and David Harmer)
- I Found This Shirt: Poems and Prose from the Centre

1999

- Just Like Watching Brazil

2000

- Perfect Catch

2001

- The Very Best of Ian McMillan

2002

- The Invisible Villain

2005

- A Tale of Three Cities (with Les Baynton, David Duncombe and others)

2006

- Ideas Have Legs: Ian McMillan vs Andy Martin

2007

- Chelp and Chunter: How to Talk Tyke (illustrated by Alex Collier)

2008

- Talking Myself Home: My Life in Verses

== Discography (with The Ian McMillan Orchestra) ==
- Sharp Stories, Taith Records, 2007
- Homing In, Taith Records, 2011
