= Lackadaisy (film) =

2023 animated short film

- Official poster
- Directed by: Fable Siegel
- Screenplay by: Tracy Butler; Fable Siegel
- Story by: Tracy Butler
- Based on: Lackadaisy by Tracy Butler
- Produced by: Tracy Butler
- Starring: Michael Kovach; Belsheber Rusape; Lisa Reimold; SungWon Cho
- Cinematography: Sara Fisher
- Edited by: Fable Siegel
- Music by: Sepiatonic; M Gewehr
- Production company: Iron Circus Comics
- Release date: March 29, 2023
- Running time: 27 minutes
- Country: United States
- Language: English
- Budget: $330,256

Lackadaisy is a 2023 American adult animated gangster comedy short film based on the webcomic of the same name by Tracy Butler. It was directed by Fable Siegel, who also co-wrote the screenplay with Butler, and follows the rivalry between the titular Lackadaisy and Marigold gangs: two bootlegging groups who are smuggling alcohol during the Prohibition era in 1927. It was the first film released by Iron Circus Comics.

Butler debuted the Lackadaisy webcomic in 2006, receiving accolades from various comic book and literature award ceremonies. The concept for the webcomic was inspired by her research of St. Louis' history, interest in jazz music, and sketches of characters she drew back in high school. The Lackadaisy webcomic received attention for its resemblance to the art styles of Walt Disney and Don Bluth. With the concept of a Lackadaisy short film being in Butler's mind for years, she developed its pitch and reached out to animator Fable Siegel, who had a background in self-styled comics and various animated series. Butler also connected with Iron Circus Comics publisher Spike Trotman, with Siegel giving Butler's pitch to Trotman at a Comic Arts Los Angeles festival.

The short film based on Lackadaisy was announced in 2020 through a Kickstarter campaign, with the intention to produce a ten-minute animated short. The funds raised nearly four times its budget, extending its production. With more than 160 artists involved, Lackadaisy emphasized visual imperfections, using details created by various animators and cleanup artists. The short film features visual influences from Art Deco, Art Nouveau, and impressionist styles, as well as its storytelling being inspired by Don Bluth's works. Butler and Siegel balanced human and feline characteristics in the characters, using occasional feline behavior throughout the short film.

Lackadaisy was released to YouTube on March 29, 2023, and was crowdfunded through a Kickstarter campaign. It was met with widespread critical acclaim for its animation style, storytelling, characters, and historical accuracy. The short film was compared to Hazbin Hotel as a pilot episode, and caught the attention of Ralph Bakshi, Tyson Hesse, and Lilly Wachowski. The first season of the web series based on the short film is currently in development, with co-production from Glitch Productions.

== Plot ==
External videos
- "Lackadaisy (Pilot)" on YouTube

In a feline-populated St. Louis, during Prohibition in 1927, bootlegger Roark "Rocky" Rickaby performs his violin while reciting his poetic memoir to the Mississippi River. After finishing his recital, Rocky joins up with his cousin Calvin "Freckle" McMurray and their close friend Ivy Pepper to dig up a coffin loaded with whisky from one of their suppliers to give to the Lackadaisy speakeasy. Just as they load the bottles into their car, they are ambushed by the rival Marigold gang consisting of former Lackadaisy member Mordecai Heller and the Cajun Savoy siblings: Nicodeme (Nico) and Serafine. In the ensuing chase, Freckle disables Marigold's car with his Tommy gun, and Mordecai forces them off the road and into the Sable mining quarry.

As Rocky runs off, Ivy is left to repair the car while Freckle holds off Mordecai. Nicodeme and Serafine, on the other hand, attack Ivy and the car. Rushing to aid Ivy, Freckle loses his cover, and Mordecai is able to land a shot. Rocky wanders the quarry and manages to rig a steam shovel to drive itself while he maniacally hurls dynamite to drive the Marigold gang away. With an explosion, he stops Mordecai, who was about to shoot Freckle. Rocky also gives Ivy time to repair the car. Rocky accidentally causes a flood by destroying a water tower. While the trio escapes, Mordecai aims his gun at the group but decides not to fire after seeing Ivy as she drives.

Above the speakeasy, the owner, Mitzi May, expresses her laments to the portrait of her deceased husband, Atlas, as she recalls how big their business used to be. She goes downstairs to the speakeasy to meet with her employees and her guest, Sedgewick "Wick" Sable, the owner of the quarry. Mitzi asks him for financial help, though Wick politely refuses to maintain his public image to the community. Rocky, Freckle, and Ivy return with only three bottles intact from the fight. Mitzi expresses displeasure with the small amount recovered and states she is happy they came back safely. Rocky and fellow musician Dorian "Zib" Zibowski play music with the band on stage. Ivy teaches a dance to Freckle, during which Mitzi reminisces about how thriving the club was in Atlas's time.

Mordecai calls his superior, Asa Sweet, and reports his and the Savoys' failure to recover the supply, and that one of their suppliers has crossed them to sell to Lackadaisy. Sweet suggests that they may need to tie up this loose end before the government catches wind of their operation.

== Voice cast ==
- Michael Kovach as Roark "Rocky" Rickaby, a compassionate yet somewhat unhinged bard-like violin player and rum-runner eager to prove himself.
- Belsheber Rusape as Calvin "Freckle" McMurray, Rocky's timid cousin who is prone to sudden outbursts of madness, especially when a gun is in his hands.
- Lisa Reimold as Ivy Pepper, an educated and confident cat, as well as Freckle's love interest.
- Ashe Wagner as Mitzi May, widow of Atlas May and the new owner of the Lackadaisy speakeasy.
- SungWon Cho as Mordecai Heller, a stoic, cold, and calculating gunman who used to work for Lackadaisy before joining the Marigold gang.
- Bradley Gareth as Sedgewick "Wick" Sable, a noble business tycoon and the owner of the Sable Quarry.
- Valentine Stokes as Dorian "Zib" Zibowski, the laid-back but disheveled lead saxophonist and clarinetist in the Lackadaisy band.
- Jason Marnocha as Viktor Vasko, a short-tempered Slovak with an eye patch who currently tends the Lackadaisy bar and Mordecai's former partner.
- Benni Latham as Serafine Savoy, Nicodeme's trigger-happy sister.
- Malcolm Ray as Nicodeme Savoy, Serafine's musclebound brother.

== Background ==
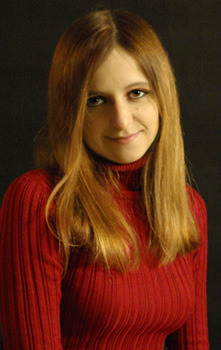
Butler in 2008

Tracy J. Butler debuted the Lackadaisy webcomic in July 2006. When she lived in St. Louis for some time, she owned a 100-year-old house and researched its history, as well as the neighborhood and history of St. Louis itself. Combined with her interest in jazz music and the characters she drew back in high school, this led to the conception of Lackadaisy.

The webcomic is set in St. Louis during the Prohibition period in the 1920s. It centers on the Lackadaisy, a speakeasy hidden in a cave beneath the Little Daisy Cafe. Being a "gang of scoundrels", the speakeasy is led by former jazz musician Mitzi, "quixotic rumrunner" Rocky, "unassuming muscle" Freckle, and "dancing fast-talker" Ivy, who deal with the tribulation of the bootlegging business themselves. Lackadaisy features anthropomorphic cats in a "jazzy, sepia-toned crime story" form themed on action and adventure with a fusion of comedy and crime.

The webcomic won five awards at the Web Cartoonists' Choice Awards in 2008, and was nominated for the Eisner Award for "Best Digital Comic". It was also noted for its resemblance to the art styles from animated films of Walt Disney and Don Bluth. Prior to the short film's announcement, Lackadaisy received international distribution through Ingram and various Amazon best-selling titles. It also earned awards from the Lambda Literacy Awards and Harvey Awards. As of March 2020, Lackadaisy was subscribed by over 1,600 users on Patreon.

== Development ==
Butler had the idea of a traditionally animated film in her mind since she was a child. When she seriously considered developing a pitch for Lackadaisy as an animated project, she first reached out to animator Fable Siegel, which she described them as having a background in self-styled comics. Butler had been a veteran animator who worked on Ben 10, Adam Ruins Everything, Wacky Races, and Hazbin Hotel. They had a connection for years through artistic circles online and various conventions, as well as spoke and exchanged books multiple times through respect for each other's work.

Butler also admired Iron Circus Comics publisher Spike Trotman, in which the former commented in a March 2020 interview with Comic Book Resources that the latter's work was "the talk of the town." Their connection led to them working on pitching Lackadaisy as an animated short film. In December 2019, Siegel attended Trotman's table at Comic Arts Los Angeles to give her the Lackadaisy pitch, which led her to crowdfund the project, offer the first two volumes of the webcomic in print, and a series of mini comics and artwork for fans.

== Production ==
=== Overview ===
Lackadaisy was written by Butler and Siegel, with the former writing and producing the story, and the latter directing and editing the short film. It was executively produced by C. Spike Trotman, with cinematography by Sara Fisher. Music credits include "Sunset Rose Cocktail" written by M. Gewehr and "Feathers N Fringe" from StockMusic.com. The theme music was composed by Sepiatonic, a Portland-based music company that specializes on electro-vaudeville music.

Similar to the webcomic series, Lackadaisy is based on the speakeasy of the same name hidden in a cave beneath the Little Daisy Cafe, where moonshine and music are prominent in the middle of Prohibition. Characters consist of "gangsters, flappers, crooked cops, rumrunners, and wide-eyed ingenues who are all, literally, jazz cats." The short film specializes on slapstick humor in a tone relating to adult animation, with BJ Colangelo of Slashfilm describing Lackadaisy's characters, dialogue, music, and plot points as reminiscent of the HBO series Boardwalk Empire. Publishers Weekly described the short film as a "screwball adventure", while Brandon Zachary of Screen Rant considered it to be "gangster-influenced".

While Lackadaisy lasted for three years in production, the community supporting the project remained up to date weekly with concept sketches, animation tests, AMA's, and Patreon live-streams. According to the creators, more than 160 "skilled artists across the world" became part of the short film's production. The COVID-19 pandemic was taking place at the time, which made Butler feel like production for Lackadaisy would be impossible at times. Upon its release, Butler, Troutman, and Siegel described Lackadaisy as a refinement that still satisfies readers of the webcomic, bringing its comic story elements into a "concise overview of tone, character, conflicts and setting" that stands on its own.

=== Animation ===
A 25-second excerpt from Lackadaisy, highlighting its stylistic animation and visual imperfections, particularly the scene where Freckle disables Marigold's car with a tommy gun.

In an interview with Cartoon Brew in April 2023, Siegel described the animation style of Lackadaisy as stylistic but practical. Instead of cutting out visual imperfections from draftsmanship, a core element of hand-drawn animation, the crew preferred showcasing the animators' and cleanup artists' details while not distracting audiences from the shot's focus. They (Note: Siegel uses they/them pronouns.) compared the approach to stop-motion animation, where details including thumbprints and fabric ripples are retained.

Siegel stated that the audience would recognize the short film as drawings while being immersed in the story as a whole, comparing it to a puppet show. This approach allowed Siegel to be less stringent when giving notes on a demanding animation process, arguing that perfectionism is a poor goal when creating art. Siegel noted that adding construction lines to the animation was more labor-intensive than leaving them out. They compared the approach to the animated film Wolfwalkers (2020), where imperfect lines represent a character's internal state. Siegel expressed an appreciation for dirt and revealed that they used a fake "paint boil" to "simulate vinyl paint on cels".

While Siegel saw the idea of adapting Butler's illustrative style into animation as highly difficult without a high budget similar to Klaus (2019), they and Butler wanted to use hand-drawn animation in a way that showcases animators' raw work, comparing it to animated films from the 1980s and 1990s and emphasizing Lackadaisy's examination of nostalgia. The animation style of the short film lean towards an Xerox-style for its grit and experimentation, and a Renaissance-era style for its emotional storytelling. Siegel and Butler also considered Don Bluth's style to be a significant influence on Lackadaisy for its dark elements.

=== Characters ===
The animation of the characters balances human and feline characteristics. According to Siegel, animated features were emphasized when they reinforce an emotion or action, functioning as visual indicators of the characters' individual personalities and anxieties. Rocky's feral personality was conveyed through a characteristic grin, while Mordecai's emotional state was communicated through his ears and tail. Cole Martin of the Tacoma Ledger noted that the characters' body and facial expressions were "exaggerated and lively, expertly playing off the personality of each individual character."

Siegel noted that the main difficulty was determining how the characters' feline traits would be emphasized. If they were communicated through body language, viewers could become accustomed to these characteristics and overlook them as cats. The production uses occasional feline behavior, such as hissing and sudden bursts of energy, which Siegel considered effective because they catch viewers off guard after being presented with human-like traits. The use of feline characteristics was intended to produce humor through the contrast between the characters' human and animal characteristics.

=== Visual design ===
Lackadaisy visually relies on a 1920s Art Deco-inspired design, particularly showcased in the opening scene as Rocky plays on the violin.

According to Siegel, the "real" world uses a limited, desaturated, and monochromatic color palette to balance realism and visual weight to the environment. The dream sequences emphasize high saturation and contrast with less continuity or consistency, as they intend to reflect the emotional states of Lackadaisy's characters, with Rocky and Mitzi being the subjects. Additionally, Siegel compared the short film's use of lighting to classic films from the mid-20th century.

Rocky's opening poem is presented against imagery influenced by the Art Deco style of the 1920s, mainly through its association with industrialization and technological growth. Construction elements and machinery are incorporated into the sequence's design and visually amplified, showcasing the nostalgic time of Rocky's narration. Elements of Art Deco's predecessor, Art Nouveau, are also incorporated into the scene, providing a contrast to both structures. Siegel stated that the intention was to evoke the 1920s without using the sepia-toned aesthetic associated with depictions of that period.

Mitzi's reverie relies on impressionist influences, as her recollection of Lackadaisy's past is presented with softer and more glamorous imagery than its depiction of reality, creating a "rose-tinted" representation of her memories. In one scene, partygoers appear as indistinct figures obscured by glitter and other visual effects, while a band from the speakeasy gradually blends into the backdrop with the Lackadaisy logo descending, followed by closing doors. Siegel described the sequence as beautiful while implying a sense of danger that can get explored in future Lackadaisy material.

== Funding ==
On March 12, 2020, Butler, Trotman, and Siegel announced a 42-day Kickstarter campaign to adapt the former's webcomic Lackadaisy into an animated short film. They added that it would be released with a new collection of artwork and unreleased mini comics titled The Lackadaisy Essentials. Iron Circus Comics began launching projects on Kickstarter in 2009, and at the time, had launched 23 projects with nearly $1.5 million in funding.

The campaign's main goal was to raise $85,000 across 42 days to produce a ten-minute animated short, but grew nearly four times its intended budget with $330,256 from 6,000 supporters on Kickstarter and Patreon, which expanded Lackadaisy's time length and production. In the first two hours following the campaign's announcement on Twitter, nearly 500 supporters rose over half of the amount. By 24 hours, the animated short film received more than $120,000 of funding.

== Promotion and release ==
The trailer was released to YouTube on January 16, 2023, announcing that the short film would have a running time of 27 minutes. On March 22, Animation Magazine released a clip preview from Lackadaisy, announcing that the short film would release to YouTube in seven days. Lackadaisy serves as Iron Circus Comics' first short film.

On March 29, 2023, the short film premiered on YouTube at 2 pm Eastern Time and 11 am Pacific Daylight Time. Within five days, Lackadaisy received more than 3.5 million views on the platform. Additionally, the short film landed on YouTube's trending list, peaking at number four. Within two weeks, Lackadaisy generated nearly 7 million views. As of August 2026, the short film has received more than 19 million views on YouTube.

On July 10, 2023, it was announced that Los Angeles-based Secret Movie Club would present the first theatrical screening of Lackadaisy, accompanied by a Q&A with Siegel, at the Million Dollar Theater, which took place on August 2. The same day of its announcement, Animation Magazine unveiled exclusive artwork designed by Butler, Siegel, and Keith Daily.

== Critical reception ==
Lackadaisy received widespread critical acclaim and caught the attention of animator and director Ralph Bakshi, illustrator Tyson Hesse, and director Lilly Wachowski. Before its premiere, Samantha King of Screen Rant said it would "capture the hearts of...comic...[and] animation fans" and capture the charm and style of the original webcomic. Mercedes Milligan of Animation Magazine described it as "highly anticipated", Rob Bricken of Gizmodo as looking "incredible" and Madeline Carpou of The Mary Sue describing it as "adorable and fun".

After the premiere of Lackadaisy, Jamie Lang of Cartoon Brew described the "very charming" effects produced by the animation process, and the "significant aesthetic differences" between the webcomic and film. BJ Colangelo of Slashfilm described it as "ridiculously impressive", praising the character designs, sound design, and animation. She called it "the next big thing in adult animation" and argued that studios would be "foolish" to pass up the film becoming a series. He also stated that the short film deserved the "A24 Hazbin Hotel treatment".

Nola Pfau of Popverse noted Lackadaisy's historical accuracy, with Butler's research of St. Louis history extended to its geography and political climate. She considered the short film to be "clever in its remixing", showcasing its worldbuilding structure and characters' antics to people who have not read the original webcomic, and emphasizing the use of animation as a medium. Pfau also compared Lackadaisy's dark tone and lighting to The Secret of NIMH (1982) and "sparking showbiz allure" to Rock-a-Doodle (1992), appreciating the "love and craft applied" to the short film.

Cole Martin of the Tacoma Ledger praised Lackadaisy's emphasis on the personalities of each character through the use of body and face expressions, as well as rough sketches and construction lines. Jason Sondhi of Short of the Week saw the short film as proving that the "early web's utopian dreams for artist discovery and support" still work, noting that it can emerge from anywhere and doesn't need to come from elite film schools or non-profit corporations to top-tier festivals. In a later review, Brandon Zachary of Screen Rant saw Lackadaisy's potential as "the next Hazbin Hotel", drawing to both of their similar passionate fanbases, stylish worlds, and unique approaches to classic genres.

== Web series ==
Noting the success of the short film's viewership and reputation, Trotman promised that there would be more Lackadaisy material, making the former considered a pilot episode. On July 25, Following the short film's success, a crowdfunding campaign for an animated web series began on the BackerKit platform, and a teaser for the show's first season was released to YouTube. Rewards for the BackerKit campaign included the first two Lackadaisy volumes, Rocky and Mordecai plushes, enamel pin sets, a custom art board drawing, associate producer credit, and animated cameo cat, with the latter two being for the animated web series. The goal for the campaign was to reach $1 million from donations to fund a full five-episode first season, which was achieved within a week.

By the end of the campaign in late August 2023, Iron Circus had received $2,008,728 from over 16,000 backers, resulting in the commission of three mini-episodes, plushes of the entire Lackadaisy primary cast, and Blu-ray sets containing the first season, short film, three mini-episodes, and a creator commentary track. On October 10, 2025, it was announced that Glitch Productions would be co-producing the series with Iron Circus, and with Olan Rogers joining as development executive. The series will have six episodes, each of which is 22 minutes long. The series is currently in production.
