= Iron Circus Comics =

American graphic novel publisher

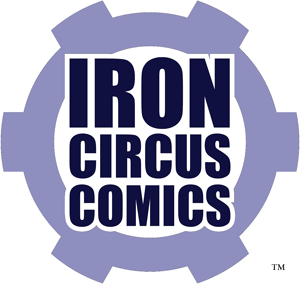
- Founded: 2007
- Founder: C. Spike Trotman
- Headquarters location: Chicago, Illinois
- Distribution: Consortium Book Sales & Distribution
- Publication types: Graphic novels
- Fiction genres: Erotica; Fantasy; Science fiction
- Imprints: Smut Peddler
- Owner(s): C. Spike Trotman
- Official website: www.ironcircus.com

Iron Circus Comics is an American graphic novel publisher founded in 2007 by C. Spike Trotman. Based in Chicago, it is known for publishing the Smut Peddler line of "lady-centric porn" anthologies and graphic novels, and for its pioneering use of crowd-funding sites such as Kickstarter to finance graphic novel publishing, raising over $1 million in revenue through the platform in its first decade.

== History ==
Trotman founded the company in 2007 to publish print editions of her webcomic Templar, Arizona. In 2009, the company began using the then-new service KickStarter as a tool to finance publication of graphic novels.

In 2012, Iron Circus published Smut Peddler, a 340-page anthology of erotic comics created by women (or creative teams that included women). Iron Circus financed the book's publication with $80,000 in donations and pre-orders through KickStarter. Another Smut Peddler volume followed in 2014. Since then, Iron Circus has published both graphic novels and themed anthologies under the "Smut Peddler Presents" banner, including Yes, Roya by Emilee Denich; My Monster Boyfriend; and Sex Machine.

Other books Iron Circus has published include anthologies Sleep of Reason, New World, Tim'rous Beastie, and FTL, Y'All!: Tales from the Age of the $200 Warp Drive, and graphic novels The Less Than Epic Adventures of TJ and Amal by E.K. Weaver, Letters for Lucardo by Otava Heikkilä, As the Crow Files by Melanie Gillman, Emperor of the Food Chain by David Malki, Crossplay by Niki Smith, and Rice Boy by Evan Dahm.

In 2016, Iron Circus and Image Comics began co-sponsoring the "Creators for Creators" publishing grant, an award given annually to an independent cartoonist, consisting of funds to produce an original graphic novel. The program was on hiatus as of 2021.

In March 2020, it was announced that Iron Circus was producing an animated short film based on Tracy J. Butler's Lackadaisy with the original creator involved. On March 29, 2023, the 27-minute short film released on YouTube.
