= Street and Lane =

Radio Comedy Series

- Genre: Situation comedy
- Running time: 30 minutes
- Country of origin: United Kingdom
- Language: English
- Home station: BBC Radio 4
- Starring: Nicholas Lane (series 1); Shaun Dooley (series 2); Fine Time Fontayne
- Written by: Dave Sheasby; Ian McMillan
- Produced by: David Hunter
- Original release: August 2005 – January 2007
- No. of series: 2
- No. of episodes: 8
- Audio format: Stereophonic sound
- Website: Street and Lane at BBC Radio 4 Extra

Street and Lane is a BBC Radio 4 radio comedy series written by Dave Sheasby and Ian McMillan. The show ran for two series which aired in 2005 and 2007. The first series featured Nicholas Lane as Johnny Street, with Shaun Dooley taking over the role for the second series. In both series, the part of Arthur Lane was played by Fine Time Fontayne.

== Cast ==
- Nicholas Lane (series one) and Shaun Dooley (series two) as Johnny Street
- Fine Time Fontayne as Arthur Lane

== Plot ==
The main characters, Johnny Street and Arthur Lane play partners in a small Yorkshire building firm. The series records their rather odd experiences in Yorkshire suburbia, doing a variety of small and large jobs for householders. Street and Lane often wax philosophical to each other about life, the Universe, and everything. Lane worked for Street's father in the firm, which apparently suffered from certain financial irregularities. Street gave up a teaching career to rescue the family business. The humour is understated, lurking under a stereotypically laconic Yorkshire mindset.

Various running jokes are used. "Head Office calling!" means Mrs. Street, who fields customer calls at home, is calling Johnny on his mobile phone. The "lady with the boiler on Misperton Avenue" is a fictional customer used as an all-purpose excuse for not being able to take on a job right away (the builders do not want to seem desperate for business) or for making a quick exit from an embarrassing situation.

== Episodes ==
=== Series 1 (2005) ===
No. overall	No. in series	Title	Original release date
1	1	"Patio Martial"	19 August 2005
2	2	"Blues on the Stairs"	26 August 2005
3	3	"Singing Detectives"	2 September 2005
4	4	"Hitting the Highs"	9 September 2005

=== Series 2 (2007) ===
No. overall	No. in series	Title	Original release date
5	1	"Ringing the Changes"	3 January 2007
6	2	"Fade to Black"	10 January 2007
7	3	"Estimates Day"	17 January 2007
8	4	"Going for Broke"	24 January 2007

== Broadcast History ==
The show has been repeated on BBC Radio 4 Extra.
