= ¡Las Sandinistas! =

Feature documentary by Jenny Murray

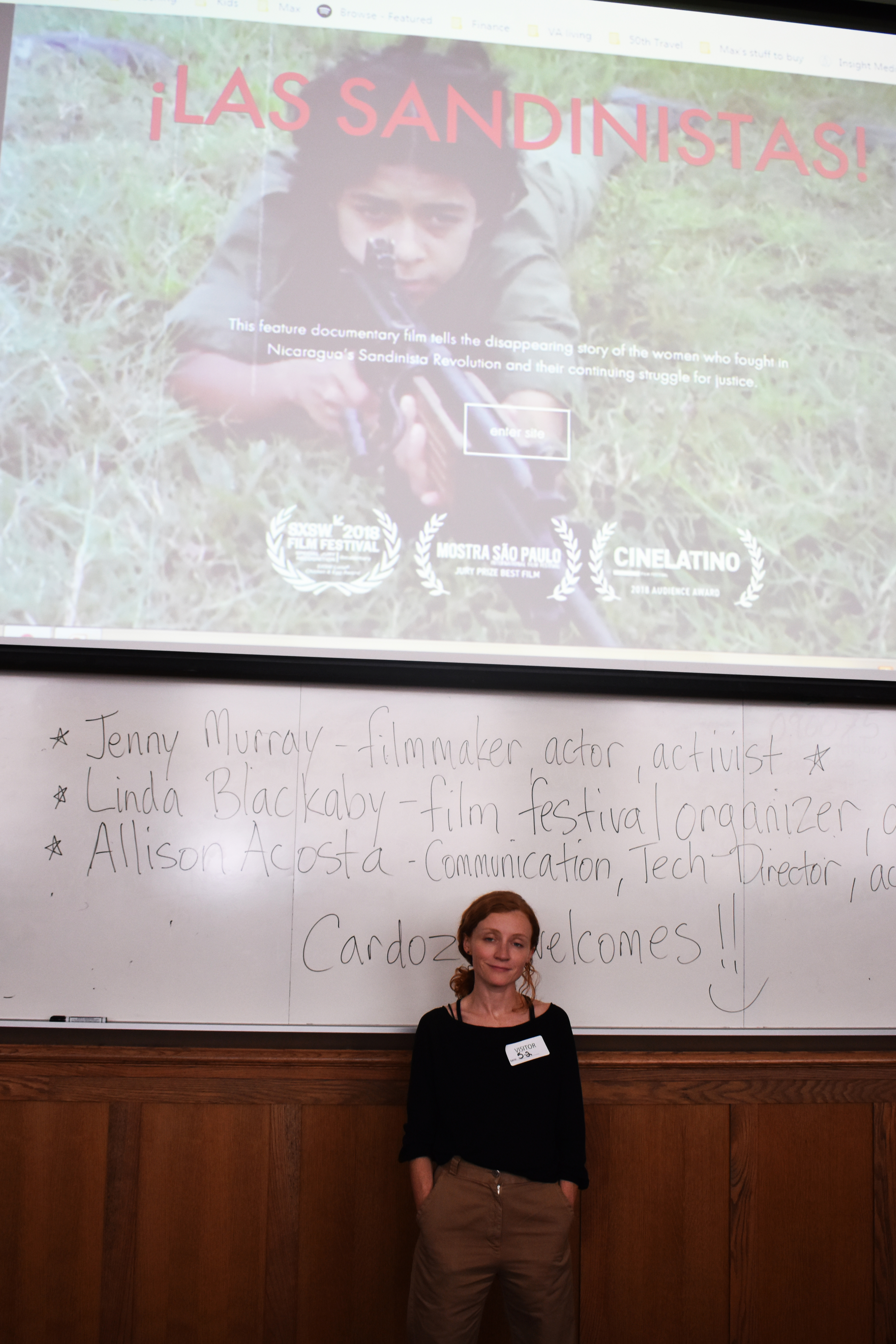
- Jenny Murray at the Cardozo Education Campus, Washington, D.C., 2019
- Directed by: Jenny Murray
- Written by: Jenny Murray
- Produced by: Jenny Murray; Sarah Winshall
- Cinematography: Laura Tomaselli
- Edited by: Jenny Murray
- Release date: 2018
- Running time: 96 minutes

¡Las Sandinistas! is a 2018 feature documentary by Jenny Murray about women who lead combat and implemented social reforms in Nicaragua in the 1979 Sandinista Revolution and the subsequent Contra war in the 1980s.

The victory of the revolution initially brought more equality, but soon women were marginalized in the Sandinista government and eventually asked to leave. The women continued their work in lower ranks, developing and implementing programs for education and improved medical care for women and children, having lost out to the masculine culture that is emblematic for Central and South America. The women's stories had previously been largely untold. Other countries, most notably the U.S., have played a major role in the root causes of the inequality for decades by backing suppressive regimes.

The film centers around the stories of Dora María Téllez and female ally combatants Daisy Zamora, Mónica Baltodano, Gioconda Belli, Sofia Montenegro, Lea Guido and others. Téllez and Baltodano rose to become Sandinista commanders. After the revolution, Téllez became Minister of Health, Zamora Deputy Minister of Culture, and Belli (later on) Director of State Communications. Murray has interviewed the women some 35 years later, when little appeared to be changed in terms of equality and in 2018 even protests were suppressed by the Sandinista government, leading to dozens of dead and hundreds wounded. Co-incidentally the documentary was released around that time.

It is Murray's first documentary film; she spent several years researching, interviewing and shooting. She wrote, directed, edited and produced the documentary. The film has been screened at a number of venues and has won several awards: the SXSW 2018 Special Jury Recognition Award and SXSW Luna^{®} Chicken & Egg Award, 2018 Mostra São Paulo's Jury Prize Best Film and Audience Award for Best Foreign Documentary, CineLatino's 2018 Audience Award, and 2019 Washington DC International Film Festival's Jury Prize in the Justice Matters Competition. Murray has spoken to audiences about the film in many places.
