= Godspeed (web series) =

American animated web series

- Genre: Science fiction; Drama
- Created by: Olan Rogers
- Written by: Ben Bjelajac; Olan Rogers
- Directed by: Olan Rogers
- Voices of: Bryce Charles; Troy Baker; Claudia Black; Olan Rogers; Tom Kenny; Coty Galloway
- Composers: Andrew Goodwin; Jake Sidwell
- Country of origin: United States
- Original language: English
- No. of episodes: 1

Production
- Executive producers: Rosa Tran; Olan Rogers; Ben Bjelajac; Forrester Kane; Billy Huggins; James Manis; Wheeler Manis
- Producers: Manul Bahm; Seth Tyler Jackson
- Editor: Brett Driver
- Running time: 28 minutes
- Production company: Lightfold

Original release
- Network: YouTube
- Release: December 15, 2023 – present

Godspeed is an American animated web series created by Olan Rogers and produced by Lightfold, the pilot episode set premiered on YouTube.

== Release ==
Godspeed set debuted on YouTube on December 15, 2023.

== Episodes ==
No.	Title	Original release date
1	"Pilot"	December 15, 2023
