= Final Space =

Adult animated television series

- Genre: Action; Adult animation Adventure; Comedy drama Science fantasy Space opera
- Created by: Olan Rogers
- Developed by: Olan Rogers; David Sacks
- Voices of: Olan Rogers; Tika Sumpter; Coty Galloway; Steven Yeun; Tom Kenny; David Tennant; Fred Armisen; Ashly Burch; Claudia Black; Ron Funches; Conan O'Brien; Jane Lynch; Keith David; Vanessa Marshall; Jasmin Savoy Brown
- Theme music composer: Shelby Merry
- Composers: Shelby Merry (s. 1–2); Jake Sidwell (s. 1 & 3); Andrew Goodwin (s. 2–3); Dodie (s. 3)
- Countries of origin: Canada; United States
- Original language: English
- No. of seasons: 3
- No. of episodes: 36 (list of episodes)

Production
- Executive producers: Olan Rogers; David Sacks; Conan O'Brien; David Kissinger; Larry Sullivan; Jeff Ross; Kathleen Grace; Melissa Schneider; Matt Hoklotubbe; Dan O'Keefe (s. 2–3); Corey Campodonico; Alex Bulkley
- Producer: Tobias Conan Trost (s. 3)
- Running time: 21 minutes
- Production companies: ShadowMachine; Jam Filled Entertainment; Star Cadet; New Form Digital; Conaco; Studio T (s. 1)

Original release
- Network: TBS (s. 1); Adult Swim (s. 2–3)
- Release: February 26, 2018 – June 14, 2021

Final Space is an adult animated space opera comedy drama television series created by Olan Rogers and developed by Rogers and David Sacks for TBS. The series involves an astronaut named Gary Goodspeed and his immensely powerful alien friend Mooncake, and focuses on their intergalactic adventures as they try to save the universe from certain doom.

The series aired on TBS on February 26, 2018. It then moved to Cartoon Network's late-night programming block, Adult Swim, starting with the second season on June 24, 2019, followed by the third and final season on March 20, 2021.

On September 10, 2021, Rogers announced that Adult Swim cancelled the series after three seasons due to the proposed merger of WarnerMedia and Discovery Inc. announced that year. In September 2022, Rogers stated on Twitter that the series would be written off for taxes. The series was internationally removed from Netflix on December 16, 2023, though the series remained available in Spain, France, Germany and Belgium until March 18, 2024.

A graphic novel titled Final Space: The Final Chapter was released on May 18, 2026, as a continuation and end of the television series.

== Plot ==
Gary Goodspeed is an energetic yet dim-witted astronaut who, in the midst of working off the last few days of his five-year sentence aboard the prison spacecraft Galaxy One, encounters a mysterious planet-destroying alien. He befriends the alien, naming him Mooncake, and then discovers that they are being pursued by the sinister, telekinetic Lord Commander. Together, Gary and Mooncake embark on a quest to save the universe, with help from the artificial intelligence HUE and a growing crew of shipmates, each with their own personal troubles – all while trying to uncover the secrets surrounding Final Space, a bizarre realm where the universe ends.

== Cast ==
Character	Voiced by	Seasons		
Character	Voiced by	1	2	3
Main characters
Gary Goodspeed	Olan Rogers	Main	Main	Main
Mooncake	Olan Rogers	Main	Main	Main
Jack the Lord Commander	David Tennant	Main	Recurring	Main
Avocato	Coty Galloway	Main	Recurring	Main
Little Cato	Steven Yeun	Main	Main	Main
HUE	Tom Kenny	Main	Main	Main
Quinn Ergon	Tika Sumpter	Main	Recurring	Main
Nightfall	Tika Sumpter	Recurring	Main	Guest
KVN	Fred Armisen	Main	Main	Main
Ash Graven	Ashly Burch		Main	Main
Sheryl Goodspeed	Claudia Black		Main	Main
Fox	Ron Funches		Main	Main
Clarence Polkawitz	Conan O'Brien	Recurring	Main	Guest
AVA	Jane Lynch		Main	Guest
Bolo	Keith David	Guest	Recurring	Main
Invictus	Vanessa Marshall		Recurring	Main
Recurring characters
Tribore Menendez	Olan Rogers	Recurring	Recurring	Recurring
John Goodspeed	Ron Perlman	Recurring	Guest	
SAMES	Tom Kenny	Recurring		
Hushfluffles / Todd H. Watson	Alan Tudyk		Recurring	Guest
Quatronostro	Oscar Montoya			Recurring
Kevin Van Newton	Tom Kenny			Recurring
Biskit	Olan Rogers			Recurring

- Olan Rogers as Gary Goodspeed, Mooncake, Tribore Menendez, Biskit, David Dewinter, Jeff, Fraskenhaur, Digital Gary, Additional voices
- Fred Armisen as KVN, Eduardo, Overlord, Groom, Evil KVNs, Mega KVN, Queen of Galang-22, Key Guardian, Kevin Van Newton, Additional voices
- Tom Kenny as HUE, SAMES (Carl, Hank, Orson, Noodles, Rob, Boobs), Dewinter Son, Helper Stevil, Septim, Molelito, Thud, Time Swap Sammy, Phil, Ziznack, Kevin Van Newton, Additional voices
- David Tennant as The Lord Commander/Jack
- Tika Sumpter as Quinn Ergon, Nightfall, Fake Nightfall, Cookie Wife, Harp Graven, Melanie Dewinter, Additional voices
- Steven Yeun as Little Cato, Meat Street Vendor, Infinity Guard Captain, Helper Assistant, Death Cookies, Mr. Graven, The Blade, Officer, Grateful Alien, Additional voices
- Coty Galloway as Avocato, Viro, Lord Commander's Officer, Additional voices
- Caleb McLaughlin as Young Gary
- Ron Perlman as John Goodspeed, Burner Tribe Leader
- John DiMaggio as Terk, Dr. Bluestein, Superior Stone, Lord Commander's Soldier, Mooncake's Voice Box, Arachnitects, Sal the Bartender, Super Molelito, Additional voices
- Gina Torres as Helper Hula (season 1), Infinity Guard AI, Infinity Guard Announcer, Additional voices
- Shannon Purser as Shannon Thunder
- Keith David as Bolo
- Andy Richter as Gatekeeper
- Conan O'Brien as Clarence Polkawitz, Chuck
- Ashly Burch as Ash Graven
- Ron Funches as Fox
- Jane Lynch as AVA, Dartricio, Mrs. Graven, Bride
- Alan Tudyk as Hushfluffles/Todd H. Watson, Frostbears, Additional voices
- Claudia Black as Sheryl Goodspeed
- Christopher Judge as Oreskis
- Vanessa Marshall as Invictus, Helper Hula (season 2)
- Tobias Conan Trost as Nightfall's Ship AI, Werthrent, Richard, Catoloupe, Henry, Additional voices
- Oscar Montoya as Quatronostro
- Phil LaMarr as Arachnitects, Additional voices
- Brett Driver as King of Ventrexia
- Mike Falzone as Shopkeeper
- Krystal Joy Brown as Avery Ergon
- Debra Wilson as Commander Ergon
- Jasmin Savoy Brown as Evra

== Episodes ==
Season	Episodes	Originally released		
Season	Episodes	First released	Last released	Network
Pilot		April 5, 2016		YouTube
1	10	February 26, 2018	May 7, 2018	TBS
2	13	June 24, 2019	September 23, 2019	Adult Swim
3	13	March 20, 2021	June 14, 2021	Adult Swim

== Production ==
=== Development ===
The idea for the show originated in mid-2010. Olan Rogers uploaded the first episode of a planned ten-part animated web-series titled Gary Space to his personal Facebook channel. The project went on hiatus three episodes in, and Rogers eventually explained on Facebook that both he and the series' artist, Dan Brown, were tending to separate projects at the time, but were in talks of continuing. On April 30, 2013, Rogers confirmed that he was rebooting and producing a season of Gary Space episodes to release at once. Over two years later, Rogers revealed that a new short for the reboot for Gary Space was planned to be pitched to Cartoon Network, in addition to premiering the episode at Buffer Festival if nothing came from the pitch.

In early 2016, Rogers announced that his project had been retitled Final Space – to avoid similarities with Steven Universe – and revealed screenshots of the short via a vlog on his YouTube channel. The pilot for Final Space was posted on Rogers' YouTube channel with voices by himself and a friend of his, Coty Galloway; Galloway had collaborated with Rogers in a Star Wars fan film called The Scarlet Lance. The video caught the attention of Conan O'Brien, who invited him to Los Angeles to pitch Final Space to TBS as a full series and also joined production as an executive producer alongside Rogers and 3rd Rock from the Sun writer and producer David Sacks. Other members of O'Brien's company, Conaco (David Kissinger, Larry Sullivan and Jeff Ross), and members of New Form who executive produced the pilot short (Kathleen Grace, Melissa Schneider and Matt Hoklotubbe) joined as executive producers as well. To balance out Rogers' inexperience in the industry, Conaco brought in Sacks to also serve as the showrunner for the series. After two weeks of working with Sacks and Jake Sidwell (co-composer of the series alongside Shelby Merry) on the pitch, Rogers and Sacks pitched the show to TBS; as well as Comedy Central, Fox, FX, YouTube, and Fullscreen; all six companies wanted the series and resulted in a bidding war between the studios over the series, with TBS acquiring the series. On December 2, 2016, it was announced that the channel had given a series order.

=== Casting ===
Rogers announced in December 2016 that he voices the main characters, Gary and Mooncake. In July 2017, an additional cast list of Fred Armisen, Conan O'Brien, Keith David, Coty Galloway (reprising from the pilot), Tom Kenny, Caleb McLaughlin, John DiMaggio, Ron Perlman, Shannon Purser, Andy Richter, David Tennant, and Steven Yeun was revealed.

=== Animation ===
Animation for the series is handled by ShadowMachine in Los Angeles and outsourced to Canadian studio Jam Filled using the Toon Boom Harmony software. The show uses NASA space imagery for the space backgrounds.

=== Cancellation and future ===
When asked on Twitter about the series' longevity, Olan Rogers had stated that he had at least six seasons' worth of material thought up for the show, including an ending for Final Space in case the series gets cancelled in the future.

On September 10, 2021, Rogers posted a video to his YouTube account stating that season 3 would be the show's last season.

On April 10, 2022, Rogers revealed on his Twitter that there is a chance that the show could be brought back in the future for an hour-long special to wrap up the story. On May 11, Rogers stated that he was still trying to put an end to the series. On June 15, after being unable to reach a deal to conclude the series in any medium, Rogers launched a Kickstarter for a short film titled Godspeed, spawned from unused ideas related to the series. At the end of the campaign, the crowdfund raised $464,438 in total.

On April 24, 2023, Rogers announced that Warner Bros. Discovery gave him a license to write and self-publish a graphic novel to end the series under various limitations. The novel, titled Final Space: The Final Chapter, was released on May 18, 2026.

== Promotion and release ==
When responding to a question on Twitter, Olan Rogers revealed that Final Space would be showcased by TBS at San Diego Comic-Con and VidCon in 2017. Unlike other creators, Rogers runs the social media accounts for the show, including the official Twitter account, calling it a "good opportunity" to connect with fans.

Final Space premiered on Reddit on February 15, 2018, followed by an AMA with Rogers. This would mark a first for a TV network to premiere a series on the site. Later that day, the first two episodes became available on TBS's website and app. TBS's sister network TNT aired a sneak peek premiere of the show on February 17, 2018, right after the 2018 NBA All-Star Weekend. After its official premiere on TBS on February 26, 2018, the pilot aired two hours later on sibling network Cartoon Network via its nighttime programming block Adult Swim; the rest of the season also aired on the network in a similar fashion. On February 20, 2018, the first two episodes were released on iTunes. Netflix handles the international distribution to the show and debuted the series on July 20.

On April 7, 2019, Rogers revealed that the show would move first-run airings to Adult Swim and be simulcast on TBS; a reversal of the airing pattern from the first season. The news would be confirmed in June of that year, with the second season premiering on June 24. TBS would air an encore the following week. Unconventional for Adult Swim programming, The Cartoon Network, Inc. and Williams Street are not involved in its production.

The show was renewed for a third season a week after the second finished airing.

The first 2 seasons became available to stream on HBO Max on March 1, 2021, ahead of season 3's premiere. Season 3 was released on HBO Max on November 13, 2021. On July 1, 2022, the series was removed from HBO Max, as well as all content related to the series from Adult Swim's official website and YouTube channel on June 21. Some episodes remain available for purchase on Amazon Prime Video and YouTube in the United States and the series was available on Netflix in international regions until its removal on December 16, 2023, though the series remained available in Spain, France, Germany and Belgium until March 18, 2024.

=== Home media ===
A Blu-ray and a soundtrack were released on August 11, 2020. The Blu-ray, containing seasons 1 and 2, was released by Warner Archive Collection, while the soundtrack was released by WaterTower Music.

== Reception ==
The first season of Final Space received positive reviews, with critics praising the show's cast (especially David Tennant's voice performance as the Lord Commander). On review aggregator Rotten Tomatoes, the first season has an approval rating of 70% based on 10 reviews, with an average rating of 6.4/10. The site's critics' consensus reads: "Final Space doesn't always hit its mark, but for those looking for a bite-sized intergalactic comedy it may prove an amusing diversion." On Metacritic season 1 has a score of 60 of 100 based on reviews from 5 critics, indicating "mixed or average reviews".

Impressions about the first episodes were also mixed, with criticism focused on Gary's humor. Collider's Dave Trumbore gave the series four out of five stars, praising the cast, the series' uniqueness and its originality. The Hollywood Reporter said "the new animated series from TBS misses the mark, and will likely float off into space". The A.V. Club gave the series a C+ grade. Reviewing the first two episodes, Den of Geek gave them a score of 3.5 out of 5 stars. IndieWire gave a B+ grade. The Daily Beast received the series favorably, comparing its potential with Adventure Time and BoJack Horseman. Robert Lloyd of the Los Angeles Times praised the show for the space backgrounds and Gary's relationship with Mooncake, but criticized for being "not as clever as Futurama or The Hitchhiker's Guide to the Galaxy or Galaxy Quest, series with which it shares certain features" and for the comedy which "leans toward things adolescent boys find funny". Screen Rant wrote favorably of the series, praising TBS' decision to release the first two episodes 11 days before the series premiere, and describing it as a "very silly comedy", comparing protagonist Gary to Homer Simpson and Philip J. Fry.

In March 2023, IndieWire named Final Space one of the best animated series of all time, praising that the show has "that balance between the personal and the universal that make all large-scale space stories worth the journey".
