= Common as Muck =

British TV drama series

- Series One title caption featuring Bernard, played by Richard Ridings
- Created by: William Ivory
- Written by: William Ivory; John Chapman; Catherine Wearing; Metin Hüseyin
- Starring: Edward Woodward; Roy Hudd; Richard Ridings; Tim Healy; Neil Dudgeon; George Raistrick; Nimmy March; Kathy Burke; Ian Mercer
- Ending theme: Original music by The Other Two
- Country of origin: United Kingdom
- Original language: English
- No. of series: 2
- No. of episodes: 12

Production
- Executive producers: Michael Wearing; John Chapman (producer)
- Running time: 50 mins

Original release
- Network: BBC One
- Release: 7 September 1994 – 12 February 1997

Common as Muck is an English comedy drama television series made by the BBC about the lives of a crew of binmen. It ran for two series between 7 September 1994 and 12 February 1997. Both were nominated for a BAFTA Television Award for Best Drama Series.

== Characters ==
Actor	Role
Edward Woodward	Nev Smith
Neil Dudgeon	Ken Andrews
Richard Ridings	Bernard Green
Tim Healy	Foxy
Stephen Lord	Jonno Fox
Roy Hudd	John Parry
June Whitfield	Irene Watson
Kathy Burke	Sharon
Terence Rigby	Dougie Houd
Saeed Jaffrey	Nat Prabhakar
Lesley Sharp	Christine Stranks
Freda Dowie	Dulcie Green
George Raistrick	Mister Arnold
Paul Shane	Mike Roberts
Tony Melody	Nev's Friend
William Ivory	Vinny
Simon Ashley	Stan
Anthony Barclay	Sunil Prabhakar
Michelle Holmes	Marie
Nimmy March	Denice Andrews

== Series One (1994) ==
The first series concentrated on the trials and tribulations of a team of bin men through a number of politically motivated moves by the local council to privatise the refuse collection of the fictional town in which the series is set. The main characters are pitched against the corrupt council leaders and are seen to be taken over by a contractor and ultimately triumphing over an increasingly corrupt management. The first series featured Tim Healy, whose character died in the penultimate episode and therefore did not appear in the second series.

- Episode One 7 September 1994
- Episode Two 14 September 1994
- Episode Three 21 September 1994
- Episode Four 28 September 1994
- Episode Five 5 October 1994
- Episode Six 12 October 1994

According to the Broadcasting Standards Council, the first episode was the second most complained about British television production of 1994, behind two violent adverts for Tango. 16 people complained about the episode's use of strong language and sex. The complaints were not upheld by the council.

== Series Two (1997) ==
The focus of the second series shifted away from the refuse disposal theme, with the opening episode showing the main characters being made redundant; subsequent episodes followed the lives of the characters, showing them experimenting with a number of different jobs including window cleaners, painters and decorators and in the case of Nev Smith coping with retirement after serving 45 years on the bins. A number of new characters were introduced into the second series including those played by veteran actors Frank Finlay, Paul Shane and June Whitfield and a minor role for James Nesbitt as a parish priest. The Complete Series 2 DVD was released on 24 November 2014.

- Episode One 8 January 1997
- Episode Two 15 January 1997
- Episode Three 22 January 1997
- Episode Four 29 January 1997
- Episode Five 5 February 1997
- Episode Six 12 February 1997

== Scheduling ==
Owing to the long period of time between the two series, the original series was repeated on BBC One in late 1996 immediately prior to the screening of the second series the following year. It was also repeated in full on UK Gold in 1999. The two series were also re-shown on the now-defunct satellite channel Granada Plus in 2002.

== Filming locations ==
- Darnhill, Heywood, Rochdale
- Newton Heath
- Miles Platting
- Shaw and Crompton (Series One)
- Oldham (Series One and Two)
- Blackpool (Series Two)
- Fleetwood (Series Two)
- Cleveleys (Series Two)
- Stalybridge (Hough Hill area used for Nev's retirement and Parade of Dustbin Trucks – Series 2 Episode 1)
- Whaley Bridge

== Commercial release ==
Series One and Two are available to buy on DVD. Both boxsets were released in 2014, in March and November respectively.

== Awards ==
Award list
Year	Ceremony	Category	Result	Ref.
1995	RTS Awards	Best Drama Series	Won	

== See also ==
- The Dustbinmen – ITV situation comedy (1969 and 1970)
