= The Sins =

2000 British television drama series

- Genre: Crime drama
- Written by: William Ivory
- Directed by: David Yates; Sallie Aphramain; Simon Curtis
- Starring: Pete Postlethwaite; Geraldine James; Caroline Hayes; Frank Finlay; Philip Jackson; Neil Stuke; Kenneth MacDonald; Kaye Wragg; Claire Rushbrook; Denise Black
- Country of origin: United Kingdom
- Original language: English
- No. of seasons: 1
- No. of episodes: 7

Production
- Executive producer: Jane Tranter
- Producer: Liza Marshall
- Production location: United Kingdom
- Running time: 50 minutes
- Production company: BBC Productions

Original release
- Network: BBC One
- Release: 24 October – 5 December 2000

The Sins is a BBC television series that aired from 24 October 2000 until 5 December 2000. The series centres on Len Green (Pete Postlethwaite), a former bank robber and getaway driver, who has retired from the criminal life and joined the undertakers run by his uncle (Frank Finlay). However, his resolve to stay out of the criminal world is tested by temptations based on the seven deadly sins. The series was directed by David Yates, Sallie Aprahamian and Simon Curtis, and was written solely by William Ivory. The complete series was released on DVD on 28 March 2011.

== Plot ==
Len Green (Pete Postlethwaite) is a bank robber. During his long career as a getaway driver, he has served many sentences and spent a fair proportion of his life behind bars. Now middle-aged, with a very expensive house, bought with the proceeds of the robberies, and an attractive wife, Gloria (Geraldine James) and five daughters, four of whom are grown up – Faith (Claire Rushbrook), Hope (Kaye Wragg), Chastity (Laura Rogers), Charity (Caroline Hayes) and Dolores (Billie Cook) (the only one who is still a child) – to whom he is devoted, he resolves to change his lifestyle and "go straight". But having joined his Uncle Irwin (Frank Finlay) in the family firm of undertakers, he is faced with many temptations, in the form of the seven deadly sins, which test his resolve to stay out of trouble. Len's friends ask him to help out with one last robbery. His wife, who can't accept that she will no longer have a steady income, steals a priceless necklace, which Len vows to return. And after so many years in prison, Len asks himself the questions: does his wife still love him? And can he still satisfy her in bed?

== Awards ==
Producer Liza Marshall won a Royal Television Society Award for Best Newcomer in 2001, and Ivory an Edgar Allan Poe Award for Best Miniseries in 2002. In the 2001 BAFTAs, the series was nominated for Best Actor (Postlethwaite), Best Actress (James) and Best Drama Series (Marshall and Ivory), but won none of these categories.

== Cast ==
- Pete Postlethwaite as Len Green
- Geraldine James as Gloria Green
- Caroline Hayes as Charity Green
- Frank Finlay as Irwin Green
- Philip Jackson as Mickey Thomas
- Neil Stuke as Carl Rogers
- Kenneth MacDonald as Oy
- Kaye Wragg as Hope Green
- Claire Rushbrook as Faith Blackwell
- Denise Black as Matisse Clegg
- Laura Rogers as Chastity Green
- Amanda Abbington as Belinda Edgeley
- Billie Cook as Dolores Green
- Nick Raggett as Rabbit
- Trevor Peacock as Maurey

== Episodes ==
No.	Title	Directed by	Written by	British air date	UK viewers (million)
1	"Pride"	Simon Curtis	William Ivory	24 October 2000	7.10m
Len Green is released from prison, determined to change his life around and go straight.
2	"Covetousness"	Sallie Aprahamian	William Ivory	31 October 2000	N/A
Len sets his eye on a rival's hearse, and is forced to fight temptation to steal it.
3	"Lust"	David Yates	William Ivory	7 November 2000	N/A
Len begins to feel as if he has been emasculated.
4	"Envy"	David Yates	William Ivory	14 November 2000	N/A
Charity becomes jealous of Len's relationship with Carl.
5	"Greed"	David Yates	William Ivory	21 November 2000	N/A
Len's improvements at the funeral parlour begin to spiral out of control.
6	"Anger"	Sallie Aphramain	William Ivory	28 November 2000	N/A
Len is furious after discovering that Gloria had a one-night stand with Mickey.
7	"Sloth"	Sallie Aphramain	William Ivory	5 December 2000	N/A
Len receives an unexpected shock which forces him to take urgent action.
