= William Ivory =

British screenwriter & actor (born 1964)

William (Billy) Ivory (born 1964) is a British screenwriter, playwright and actor. He is a three-time BAFTA nominee.

== Early life and career ==
Ivory was born in Southwell, Nottinghamshire and has set many of his works in Nottingham. He was a pupil at the Minster School in Southwell. He dropped out of his English degree at the University of London after three weeks, going on to work as a binman for nearly three years, writing in his spare time. After he broke his arm, he wanted a less arduous job and so applied to be a stagehand at the Nottingham Playhouse, eventually acting there. He went on to play several roles in television adverts and drama series. Ivory's first television writing credit was Journey to Knock, in 1991, and he has since created and written many television dramas. Ivory's first stage play, The Retirement of Tom Stevens, was produced in 2006. He wrote the screenplay for Made in Dagenham (2010), and for the 2023 film starring Michael Caine and Glenda Jackson, The Great Escaper.

Ivory was nominated for a television BAFTA for Best Drama Series for Common As Muck in 1995 and 1998 and for Best Drama Series for The Sins in 2001. He won the Edgar Allan Poe Award for Best TV Feature or Miniseries for The Sins in 2002.

Ivory received an honorary doctorate from the University of Nottingham in 2009. He is Senior Lecturer in Creative Writing at Nottingham Trent University, a post he has held since 2022.

== Personal life ==
Ivory is the son of Bill and Edna Ivory; Bill was a local newspaper journalist with the Nottingham Evening Post. Ivory has two older sisters, Laraine and Sally-Ann. His mother Edna suffered from motor neurone disease, and Ivory's first television drama, Journey to Knock (1991), was inspired by her experience of the disease. Ivory is a fan of Notts County football team. In 2015 one of Nottingham Express Transit's trams, Tram 232, was named after Ivory.

== Filmography ==
=== Film, as writer ===
- 2000 The Closer You Get (Writer)
- 2010 Made in Dagenham (Writer)
- 2023 The Great Escaper (Writer)

=== Television, as writer/producer ===
- 1991 Journey to Knock (Writer)
- 1993–1994 Minder (Writer)
- 1994–1997 Common As Muck (Creator and Writer)
- 1997 King Leek (Writer)
- 2000 The Sins (Writer)
- 2002 Night Flight (Writer)
- 2004 A Thing Called Love (Writer)
- 2005 Faith (Writer)
- 2008 The Invisibles (Creator, Writer and Executive Producer)
- 2011 Women in Love (Writer and Executive Producer
- 2012 Bert and Dickie (Writer)
- 2013 Burton & Taylor (Writer)
- 2013 Truckers (Writer and Executive Producer)
- 2018 Torvill & Dean (Writer)
- 2020 Isolation Stories (Writer)

=== Television, film and radio, as actor ===
- 1988 Punishment Without Crime (TV; Policeman)
- 1988 Strike Pay (TV; Ephraim Wharmby)
- 1989 Boon (TV; Reporter)
- 1989 Capstick's Law (TV; Ramsden)
- 1989 Confessional (TV; Roadblock Sergeant)
- 1989 Ice Dance (TV; Lad in Disco)
- 1989–1990 Coronation Street (TV; Eddie Ramsden)
- 1990 All Creatures Great and Small (TV; Harold Peart)
- 1990 How We Used to Live (TV; Gideon)
- 1991 Deptford Graffiti (TV; Ted)
- 1992–1993 Emmerdale (TV; Billy Moody)
- 1992–1993 Resnick (TV; DC Mark Devine)
- 1993 Between the Lines (TV; Andrew Hytner)
- 1993 Chef! (TV; Greg)
- 1993 The Merrihill Millionaires (TV; Ken Ashton)
- 1993 Three Seven Eleven (TV; Patrick Dunphy)
- 1993 20th Century Vampire (Radio; Wayne)
- 1995 The All New Alexei Sayle Show (TV)
- 1995 Sardines (TV; Chris)
- 1997 Common As Muck (TV; Vinny)
- 1997 King Leek (TV; Teacher)
- 2000 Care (TV film; DS Devlin)
- 2000 Lock, Stock... (TV; Sharpy)
- 2000 The Sins (TV; Man in Park)
- 2002 Night Flight (TV; Keys Sergeant)
- 2004 A Thing Called Love (TV; Drunken Man)
- 2005 Rose and Maloney (TV; Detective Robben)
- 2008 The Invisibles (TV; Priest)
- 2010 Made in Dagenham (Film; Reporter)
- 2017 Whiskers and Jane (Short film; Keith Salt)

=== Stage plays, as writer ===
- 2006 The Retirement of Tom Stevens
- 2010 Bomber's Moon
- 2012 Diary of a Football Nobody

=== Stage plays, as actor ===
- 1985 Me Mam Sez (by Barry Heath; Nottingham Playhouse; Jack)
