= 20th Century Vampire =

BBC Radio 4 comedy series

- Genre: Comedy
- Running time: 30 minutes
- Country of origin: United Kingdom
- Language(s): English
- Home station: BBC Radio 4
- Starring: Louise Lombard, Joanna Kanska
- Written by: Joe Turner
- Original release: 1993 – 1993
- No. of series: 1
- No. of episodes: 6
- Audio format: Stereophonic sound

20th Century Vampire is a radio situation comedy series written by Joe Turner. It was originally broadcast in six episodes on BBC Radio in 1993. In the UK, it is repeated from time to time on the digital channel BBC Radio 4 Extra (formerly BBC7), available globally via the BBC Sounds website.

== Plot ==
Eloise (Louise Lombard) works at the Co-op supermarket in a town in the North of England. She feels different from the people around her, dresses in black, and is unhappy much of the time, as if some piece of her life is missing. Then her mysterious Transylvanian Aunt Lucretia (Joanna Kanska) reveals that she is really a vampire, a hereditary condition, and she must enter training to fulfill her destiny. Eloise eventually embraces her fate, but has to deal with her boyfriend Wayne, played by William Ivory, and her equally mystified co-workers at the store, including flatmate and best friend Debbie (Jane Hazlegrove). She is horrified to find herself back in "school", with Lucretia as the teacher, even to the extent of sitting for three hour examination papers. Despite her intelligence, she consistently performed poorly on exams in school, and she is certain that this time will be no different. The "practical section" of the exams, however, preserves her grade.

Later she wants to tell Wayne and others about herself, but Lucretia convinces her to test them first by telling each a different, fictitious but shocking "secret" about herself, making them promise not to tell anyone else, to see if they can in fact keep her confidence. So Wayne learns that she was once jailed for stealing, Debbie is told that she is pregnant, and she tells her boss Mr. Jenkins that she is secretly in love with him. With some nudging from Lucretia, hilarious consequences ensue.

== Cast ==
- Eloise – Louise Lombard
- Lucretia – Joanna Kanska
- Wayne – William Ivory
- Debbie – Jane Hazlegrove
- Mr. Jenkins – Fine Time Fontayne

== Episodes ==
- I Am a Vampire – Eloise receives monumental news from her mysterious Aunt Lucretia; it seems the Co-op checkout girl is now a vampire!
- Back to School – GCSE vampirism exam-time, but at least there is a practical!
- The Biggest Secret – Bursting to share her news of her vampirism, Eloise tells each of her possible confidants a dark secret (all untrue) to see if they can be trusted.
- Staff Outing – Debbie is responsible for arranging the annual Co-op staff outing, and decides on a trip to donate blood.
- Endangered Species – Eloise and Lucretia discover that Mr Jenkins's blood is the rarest – and tastiest! – in the world.
- Love Shack – Left alone to castle-sit in Lucretia's absence, how far will Eloise let boyfriend Wayne go?
