= Fine Time Fontayne =

English actor and theatre director (born 1951)

- Born: Ian Crossley; 1951 (age 74–75); Wombwell, West Riding of Yorkshire, England, United Kingdom
- Occupations: Actor, theatre director

Ian Crossley (born 1951), better known by the stage name Fine Time Fontayne, is an English actor and stage director.

== Early life ==
Fontayne was born in Wombwell, West Riding of Yorkshire (now South Yorkshire) into a mining family. In the 1960s, he moved with his parents and brothers to Sheffield, where they ran a pub. He took his stage name when he began singing and playing at a local folk club in Yorkshire. He had previously called himself Ordinary Seaman Whittle. He started acting in the 1970s with the Crucible Vanguard Company.

== Career ==
In the early years of his career Fontayne worked in cabaret, community and repertory theatre, and in the Red Ladder Theatre Company. He played roles in long-running British TV series including All Creatures Great and Small, Coronation Street, Emmerdale, and Heartbeat.

He is a frequent voice in BBC Radio dramas (including The Blackburn Files, 20th Century Vampire and Street and Lane) and has appeared in films including 24 Hour Party People and Butterfly Kiss.

Fontayne appeared in the 2002 radio series The Little World of Don Camillo. He directed a successful production of Sleeping Beauty at the Mercury Theatre, Essex in December 2007 and January 2008. In February 2020, Fontayne portrayed the role of Ned Wainwright in the BBC soap opera Doctors.

Fontayne was a regular feature in the Oldham Coliseum Theatre's annual pantomime, co-writing and performing as the pantomime dame in productions of Aladdin, Sleeping Beauty, and Mother Goose.

In 2023, he appeared as Joseph Broadbent in Shane Meadows' period drama The Gallows Pole.
