= List of Final Space episodes =

The following is a list of episodes from the series Final Space.

== Series overview ==
Season	Episodes	Originally released		
Season	Episodes	First released	Last released	Network
Pilot		April 5, 2016		YouTube
1	10	February 26, 2018	May 7, 2018	TBS
2	13	June 24, 2019	September 23, 2019	Adult Swim
3	13	March 20, 2021	June 14, 2021	Adult Swim

== Episodes ==
=== Pilot (2016) ===
Title	Directed by	Written by	Original release date
"Final Space"	Olan Rogers	Olan Rogers & Jake Sidwell	April 5, 2016
After the battle against the Lord Commander, Gary decides that he has to go back and save Quinn despite having his memory wiped in the process when jumping into a wormhole.

=== Season 1 (2018) ===
No. overall	No. in season	Title	Directed by	Written by	Original release date	Online release date	U.S. viewers (millions)
1	1	"Chapter One"	Mike Roberts	Olan Rogers & David Sacks	February 17, 2018 (TNT); February 26, 2018 (TBS)	February 15, 2018	1.27 (TNT); 0.48 (TBS)
Gary, after five lonely years in a space prison, meets an alien he calls Mooncake, and vows to keep it safe, but what Gary doesn't realize, however, is that Mooncake is also a planet destroyer.
2	2	"Chapter Two"	Mike Roberts & Dan O'Connor	Olan Rogers & David Sacks and Jane Becker	February 17, 2018 (TNT); March 5, 2018 (TBS)	February 15, 2018	1.27 (TNT); 0.58 (TBS)
Gary and Avocato must stop a bounty hunter named Terk from telling the Lord Commander that Mooncake is on the Galaxy One; meanwhile, the former prisoner has a disastrous first encounter with the Lord Commander.
3	3	"Chapter Three"	Ben Bjelajac	Olan Rogers & David Sacks and Alyssa Lane & Alex Sherman	March 12, 2018	February 26, 2018	0.43 (TBS)
Gary and Avocato try to hide Mooncake safely away on the planet Yarno, but end up trapped in a terrifying mind-puzzle; Mooncake is forced to fight in a combat arena called the Deathcropolis; Quinn investigates the gravitational disturbance.
4	4	"Chapter Four"	Mike Roberts	Olan Rogers & David Sacks	March 19, 2018	March 13, 2018	0.44 (TBS)
After the Galaxy One is hacked by the Infinity Guard, Gary has to harvest energy from a nearby star to reignite the engines and escape; the radiation poisoning from the star sends Gary into a trance of painful memories; Gary and Quinn are finally reunited.
5	5	"Chapter Five"	Chris Paluszek	Adam Stein and Christopher Amick & Ben Mekler and Jane Becker	March 26, 2018	March 20, 2018	0.54 (TBS)
Gary, Quinn, and Avocato trace the cause of the gravitational disturbance to an eerie bioluminescent planet, and must put a stop to whatever is causing it.
6	6	"Chapter Six"	Ben Bjelajac	Alyssa Lane & Alex Sherman and Cameron Squires	April 9, 2018	March 26, 2018	0.51 (TBS)
Gary and Avocato go on a mission to save Avocato's son, Little Cato, from the Lord Commander's prison planet. Quinn sets out to leave the Galaxy One, however is stopped and dissuaded by HUE, who shows her the tapes Gary made for her. Gary and Avocato are caught by the Lord Commander, and he makes a possessed Little Cato attack Avocato whilst he finds Mooncake's location from Gary's mind. Little Cato is broken out from his mind control, and Gary, Little Cato and Avocato escape to the Galaxy One, but not before the Lord Commander finds out Mooncake is on the Galaxy One and places a bomb on Little Cato's back. The crew of the Galaxy One destroy the prison and escape, however as they discover the bomb, Avocato takes the bomb and sacrifices himself to save Gary and Little Cato, and he is killed instantly to everyone's horror.
7	7	"Chapter Seven"	Chris Paluszek	Christopher Amick & Ben Mekler	April 16, 2018	April 9, 2018	0.39 (TBS)
Gary grapples with his future when he learns that his prison sentence is up.
8	8	"Chapter Eight"	Mike Roberts	Olan Rogers & David Sacks	April 23, 2018	April 16, 2018	0.43 (TBS)
Gary and his crew encounter a Titan named Bolo, who tells them how to close the breach in the fabric of space.
9	9	"Chapter Nine"	Ben Bjelajac	Adam Stein	April 30, 2018	April 23, 2018	0.39 (TBS)
The crew of the Galaxy One returns to Earth to find an anti-matter bomb that can save the universe.
10	10	"Chapter Ten"	Mike Roberts	Olan Rogers & David Sacks	May 7, 2018	April 30, 2018	0.40 (TBS)
Gary, Quinn, and the team engage in a final confrontation with the Lord Commander to decide the fate of Earth and the universe.

=== Season 2 (2019) ===
No. overall	No. in season	Title	Directed by	Written by	Original release date	TBS air date	U.S. viewers (millions) (on Adult Swim)
11	1	"The Toro Regatta"	Ben Bjelajac	Olan Rogers and David Sacks	June 24, 2019	July 1, 2019	0.58
Gary, who is rescued from the wreckage of space, must earn his freedom back by winning the deadliest race in the galaxy.
12	2	"The Happy Place"	Yoriaki Mochizuki	Dan O'Keefe, Olan Rogers and David Sacks	July 1, 2019	July 8, 2019	0.41
The crew gets trapped in a happy ship where things aren't what they seem; Gary must confront the human cost of having lost Earth.
13	3	"The Grand Surrender"	Anne Walker Farrell	Olan Rogers and David Sacks	July 8, 2019	July 15, 2019	0.50
The search for a dimensional key leads the Crimson Light to Ash's home planet; HUE hosts a bachelor party for an unexpected visitor.
14	4	"The Other Side"	Ben Bjelajac	Dan O'Keefe, Olan Rogers and David Sacks	July 15, 2019	July 22, 2019	0.59
A collision with space time traps half of the Crimson Light in a perilous other dimension.
15	5	"The Notorious Mrs. Goodspeed"	Yoriaki Mochizuki	Cameron Squires, Olan Rogers and David Sacks	July 22, 2019	July 29, 2019	0.66
Gary reconnects with the mother who abandoned him; Mooncake misses Gary's attention.
16	6	"The Arachnitects"	Anne Walker Farrell	Kelly Lynne D'Angelo & Nick Watson, Olan Rogers and David Sacks	July 29, 2019	August 5, 2019	0.68
When Mooncake is mysteriously taken from the Crimson Light, the crew must find him in the nether reaches of space; Tribore rebuilds the resistance.
17	7	"The First Times They Met"	Ben Bjelajac	Deirdre Devlin & Olan Rogers and David Sacks	August 5, 2019	August 12, 2019	0.55
Nightfall attempts to bring the past back to life, leaving the crew powerless against a pack of evil KVNs.
18	8	"The Remembered"	Yoriaki Mochizuki	Dan O'Keefe & Olan Rogers and David Sacks	August 12, 2019	August 19, 2019	0.64
An unexpected trip through time provides a unique opportunity for the crew.
19	9	"The Closer You Get"	Ben Bjelajac	Kelly Lynne D'Angelo & Nick Watson and Olan Rogers and David Sacks	August 19, 2019	August 26, 2019	0.53
Gary discovers a way he may be able to communicate with Quinn; Tribore reconnects with a resistance fighter who has an ulterior motive.
20	10	"The Lost Spy"	Anne Walker Farrell	Kelly Lynne D'Angelo & Nick Watson and Olan Rogers and David Sacks	August 26, 2019	September 2, 2019	0.53
Gary and his crew search on Galang 22 for Little Cato; Clarence, Fox, and Ash pull off their greatest con; Sheryl's secrets come out.
21	11	"The Set Up"	Anne Walker Farrell	Cameron Squires, Olan Rogers and David Sacks	September 9, 2019	September 16, 2019	0.55
An act of betrayal shakes the crew; HUE and Mooncake have a day out for themselves.
22	12	"The Descent Into Darkness"	Yoriaki Mochizuki	Kelly Lynne D'Angelo & Nick Watson and Olan Rogers and David Sacks	September 16, 2019	September 23, 2019	0.62
The search for the stolen dimensional keys leads the crew to a planet being sucked into the Dark Zone; HUE and Ava get closer.
23	13	"The Sixth Key"	Ben Bjelajac	Olan Rogers & David Sacks	September 23, 2019	September 30, 2019	0.64
With the dimensional keys recovered, the crew travels to Inner Space where they finally try to free Bolo.

=== Season 3 (2021) ===
No. overall	No. in season	Title	Directed by	Written by	Original release date	TBS air date	U.S. viewers (millions) (on Adult Swim)
24	1	"…And Into The Fire"	Ben Bjelajac	Olan Rogers & David Sacks	March 20, 2021	April 19, 2021	0.37
Quinn and Gary's reunion is cut short when Invictus springs his trap, destroying the Crimson Light and stranding the crew on a strange planet where they must face an army of reanimated corpses.
25	2	"The Hidden Light"	Juan Meza-León	Olan Rogers & David Sacks	March 27, 2021	April 26, 2021	0.34
Gary, Quinn, H.U.E. and KVN encounter Earth's last survivor and search for a ship so that they can save the others lost in Final Space. Meanwhile Bolo and Mooncake begin their Titan hunt.
26	3	"The Ventrexian"	Ken Wong	Olan Rogers & David Sacks	April 3, 2021	May 3, 2021	0.26
Following his resurrection, the Lord Commander attempts to pry information about Mooncake's whereabouts out of Avocato, forcing him to relive his dark past. Quinn struggles with an internal conflict while Bolo and Mooncake face off against Oreskis, a powerful Titan who was formerly Bolo's best friend.
27	4	"One of Us"	Juan Meza-León	Olan Rogers & David Sacks	April 10, 2021	May 10, 2021	0.29
Gary and Quinn plan a dangerous rescue mission to save the others from the Lord Commander. Ash learns of her connection to Invictus.
28	5	"All the Moments Lost"	Ben Bjelajac	Ben Bjelajac	April 17, 2021	May 17, 2021	0.31
As the crew flees from the Lord Commander, the Galaxy Two lightfolds into the orbit of a mysterious black hole that threatens to destroy them. Ash struggles to keep her powers under control and Quinn's sickness causes her to hallucinate traumatic memories.
29	6	"Change Is Gonna Come"	Ken Wong	Olan Rogers & David Sacks	April 24, 2021	May 24, 2021	0.33
Gary and the crew race to find a cure for Quinn's Final Space poisoning, while Ash confronts Invictus. Meanwhile, Tribore and Quatronostro find out about a prophecy and journey to the great oracle of Tim Belts.
30	7	"The Chamber of Doubt"	Ben Bjelajac	Olan Rogers & David Sacks	May 1, 2021	May 31, 2021	0.25
As an infection grows within Bolo, the crew races to help before he's lost to them forever! Ash is led astray by Invictus.
31	8	"Forgiveness"	Juan Meza-León	Olan Rogers & David Sacks	May 8, 2021	June 7, 2021	0.28
The Team Squad's morale reaches its lowest point after they lose one of their own. Avocato is forced to admit a terrible secret to Gary while Ash finds solace in an unexpected companion.
32	9	"Hyper-Transdimensional Bridge Rising"	Ken Wong	Olan Rogers & David Sacks	May 15, 2021	June 14, 2021	0.35
The crew heads to Earth in an attempt to activate the Hyper-Transdimensional Bridge - but, in order to do so, they must reconnect with a former friend. Past enemies of the Team Squad converge to trap the crew in Final Space forever.
33	10	"Until the Sky Falls"	Ben Bjelajac	Ben Bjelajac	May 22, 2021	June 21, 2021	0.40
Gary and Quinn go on a perilous mission to activate the Titan killing apparatus, while Avocato races to stop the Lord Commander's ultimate transformation.
34	11	"The Dead Speak"	Juan Meza-León	Olan Rogers & David Sacks	May 29, 2021	June 28, 2021	0.31
After their catastrophic failure on Earth, the crew fight to survive a ship-wide invasion of possessed Garys!
35	12	"The Leaving"	Ken Wong	Olan Rogers & David Sacks	June 7, 2021	July 5, 2021	0.26
A miraculous discovery seems to have saved the battered Team Squad, But Invictus's manipulation threatens to tear the crew apart as Avocato's secret is revealed.
36	13	"The Devil's Den"	Ben Bjelajac	Olan Rogers & David Sacks	June 14, 2021	July 12, 2021	0.25
A shattered Team Squad is left reeling from yet another betrayal. With morale at an all time low, Gary, Avocato and HUE travel to Invictus's lair to confront a friend and save another. Quinn comes to terms with her destiny as Nightfall while Sheryl and Mooncake try to secure a way out of Final Space once and for all.

== Ratings ==
Final Space : U.S. viewers per episode (thousands)

Season	Episode number													Average
Season	1	2	3	4	5	6	7	8	9	10	11	12	13	Average
1	480	580	430	440	540	510	390	430	390	400	–			460
2	580	490	500	590	660	680	550	640	530	530	550	620	640	580
3	370	340	260	290	310	330	250	280	350	400	310	260	250	310

Audience measurement performed by Nielsen Media Research
