= The Invisibles (TV series) =

- The Invisibles intertitle
- Genre: Comedy drama
- Created by: William Ivory
- Directed by: Will Sinclair; Metin Huseyin
- Starring: Anthony Head; Warren Clarke; Jenny Agutter; Dean Lennox Kelly
- Composers: Nick Green & Tristin Norwell
- Country of origin: United Kingdom
- Original language: English
- No. of series: 1
- No. of episodes: 6

Production
- Executive producers: George Faber; Charlie Pattinson; William Ivory; Andrew Lowe; Polly Hill
- Producer: Richard Burrell
- Production locations: Ireland; Northern Ireland
- Editor: Adam Trottman
- Running time: 60 min.
- Production company: Company Pictures

Original release
- Network: BBC One BBC HD
- Release: 1 May – 5 June 2008

The Invisibles is a British 2008 comedy drama series created and written by William Ivory for the BBC. It was produced by Company Pictures, shot in the Republic of Ireland and Northern Ireland.

== Premise ==
Maurice Riley (Head) and Syd Woolsey (Clarke), are "The Invisibles", a team of retired master burglars. After a string of successful crimes during the 1980s – during which they were never apprehended or identified by the authorities – they retired with their wives to the Spanish Mediterranean coast. In their heyday, the media turned them into minor folk heroes.

As they age, they return to England, settling in a quiet Devon fishing village. They still have enough money to support themselves comfortably (though not as extravagantly as they might be used to), and look forward to a quiet life of fishing and the benefits of the NHS. Circumstances, however, conspire to pull them back to a life of crime. Woolsey's son (Tighe) is in trouble with mobsters, and the son of a former associate (Lennox Kelly) idolizes them and wants them to teach him the business. On top of this, they're feeling old and bored. Early capers prove to them that security technology and the brutality of the criminal life have changed dramatically in two decades, and they've lost their edge as well. But the excitement is undeniable, and they try to make a go of it.

Maurice's wife Barbara (Agutter), initially resistant to their plans, can't deny the positive effect it has on Maurice's demeanour. Their daughter, Grace (Emily Head), is completely unaware how Dad made his money or what he does when he goes out for the evening.

== Cast ==
- Warren Clarke as Syd Woolsey
- Anthony Head as Maurice Riley
- Dean Lennox Kelly as Hedley Huthwaite
- Jenny Agutter as Barbara Riley
- Emily Head as Grace Riley
- Paul Barber as Young Nick
- Mina Anwar as Helen Huthwaite
- Darren Tighe as Joe Woolsey

== Music ==
The music was especially commissioned and composed by Nick Green and Tristin Norwell. The brass parts were performed by Guy Barker and Phil Todd.

== Production ==
The series was filmed in the Northern Ireland village of Portaferry, County Down which was considered a good look alike for a Devon village without being so crowded.

It was originally commissioned under the title Desperados but was changed to The Invisibles to match the name used by Head and Clarke's characters, and in reference to how people become "invisible" in society as they get older.

The BBC confirmed in March 2009 that it would not be renewing the series for a second season.

== DVD ==
It was released on DVD 14 July 2008 in the UK, and 26 May 2009 in the US.

== Episodes ==
| No. | Title | Original release date |
|---|---|---|
| 1 | "Episode 1" | 1 May 2008 |
After fifteen years of living it up in the Costa del Sol, Maurice Riley and Syd Woolsey are back in Britain. Mo is determined to keep his promise to his wife and not return to crime, but Syd's son is in trouble and the only way they can help bail him out is to rob again. With the help of their old colleague's son Hedley, the boys try one last job. Or so they say.
| 2 | "Episode 2" | 8 May 2008 |
Maurice and Syd are shocked when Knacker, a copper from their past, rents the flat below them. Maurice struggles to keep him away from his visiting daughter, who doesn't know about his criminal history. Things get much worse for the boys when Knacker reveals he has evidence that could send them both down for a very long time – unless they do a job for him. They complete the job, but Knacker is seen by the authorities and blamed for the crime. He dies during the escape of natural causes, explaining to Mo he wanted the stuff for his wife.
| 3 | "Episode 3" | 15 May 2008 |
Maurice is rattled when Barbara befriends a local aristocrat. When her bracelet is stolen, Maurice is convinced he knows the culprit and will stop at nothing to prove he's right. Meanwhile, Syd runs into his first love and as sparks fly again, he completely goes off the boil.
| 4 | "Episode 4" | 22 May 2008 |
Maurice decides to try and crack the one safe that he could never open, the iron lady, ignoring warnings from Hedley and Syd of a curse on the safe. But, is it really a safe at all? Or is it just a distraction, the real safe, a much smaller one always right next to it. After, he cracks it he makes a getaway. And what beautiful prize does he get for his troubles? A paint bomb! Poof. And the trio of criminals end up looking like the Smurfs.
| 5 | "Episode 5" | 29 May 2008 |
Hedley considers leaving the gang and giving up his life of crime after finding out that his wife is pregnant.
| 6 | "Episode 6" | 5 June 2008 |
After their doctor suffers a heart attack, Maurice and Syd realize that they're getting old. They both about trying to be young in very different ways: Syd tries cool clothes, roof jumping and other junkie related stuff, while Mo attempts to stop being short-tempered and become calm and peaceful, to give himself less stress. Barbara actually tries to encourage the weakling Mo to steal the real violin, which belonged to their daughter, but, she knows she's been given back a fake. After bodging the attempt to retrieve the stolen violin, they find themselves in a police siege in the pub. Hedley pretends to be a hostage and Syd and Mo get to grips that they're becoming old. They injure Syd's son in the genital area to get him out of the pub and tell Barbara how passes the message on, so, that their mentor knows what to do. They then escape, disguised and drive a motorbike out through the police squad and to safety, leaving their "Hostage" knocked out on the floor. They all celebrate with a big party in the Jacuzzi, to the Invisibles final crime.
