= The Closer You Get (film) =

- Directed by: Aileen Ritchie
- Written by: William Ivory
- Story by: Herbie Wave
- Produced by: Uberto Pasolini
- Starring: Ian Hart; Seán McGinley; Niamh Cusack; Ruth McCabe
- Cinematography: Robert Alazraki
- Edited by: Sue Wyatt
- Music by: Rachel Portman
- Production company: Redwave
- Distributed by: Fox Searchlight Pictures
- Release date: 2000
- Running time: 90 minutes
- Countries: United Kingdom; Ireland
- Language: English

The Closer You Get is a 2000 comedy film written by William Ivory, directed by Aileen Ritchie and starring Ian Hart, Seán McGinley, Niamh Cusack and Ruth McCabe.

== Plot ==
The Closer You Get (2000) is an Irish romantic comedy set in a small rural village in Ireland.

The story follows a group of lonely local men who are frustrated because all the young women have left their village for better opportunities. Tired of being single and ignored, they come up with a wild plan: they send a fake letter to a women’s magazine pretending to be a desperate bachelor asking for help finding a wife.

The magazine publishes the story, and suddenly women from all over start writing letters to the men in the village. Excited and hopeful, the men prepare for potential romance — but things get complicated when real emotions, insecurities, jealousy, and misunderstandings get in the way.

At the center is Alfie, a shy mechanic who struggles with confidence and genuine connection. As the story unfolds, the film explores themes of loneliness, masculinity, pride, and the difference between fantasy and real love.

== Cast ==
- Ian Hart as Kieran
- Seán McGinley as Ian
- Niamh Cusack as Kate
- Ruth McCabe as Mary
- Ewan Stewart as Pat
- Pat Shortt as Ollie
- Cathleen Bradley as Siobhan
- Sean McDonagh as Sean
- Risteárd Cooper as Father Hubert Mallone
- Maureen O'Brien as Dollie
- Pat Laffan as Giovanni
- Britta Smith as Mrs. Duncannon
- Deborah Barnett as Ella
- Frank Laverty as Brian
- Dessie Gallagher as Mickey

== Reception ==
The film has a 32% rating on Rotten Tomatoes based on 19 reviews. Roger Ebert of the Chicago Sun-Times awarded the film two stars out of four. Ben Falk of the BBC awarded the film two stars out of five.
