= Caroline Hayes (actress) =

British actress

- Occupations: Stage actor, television actor

Caroline Hayes is an English actress currently working and living in London. She has appeared on stage and television in the UK and Canada, most notably in the BBC series The Sins, alongside Pete Postlethwaite and Geraldine James, and Servants, another BBC series featuring Joe Absolom. She also starred in the Donmar Warehouse production of The Real Thing by Tom Stoppard alongside Steven Dillane and Jennifer Ehle. In the North American market, she had a supporting role in two episodes of the Canadian science fiction TV series Starhunter.
