= Templar, Arizona =

American webcomic

- Author: Spike Trotman
- Website: TemplarAZ.com
- Launch date: June 5, 2005
- End date: September 29, 2014

Templar Arizona is a webcomic written and drawn by Charlie Spike Trotman. It was hosted on Webcomics Nation. Trotman describes Templar, Arizona as "a story about a town, and the people who live there", specifically referring to the city of Templar as a character rather than a setting. The neologism "culture fiction" was coined to describe it.

The fictional city of Templar exists in a subtly different alternate universe. Trotman describes it as "a slightly irregular Arizona that fell off the back of a truck somewhere, and now all the power outlets are a weird shape and a couple of wars never happened". This city is most strongly marked by its fictional subcultures (many of which are veiled commentary on real ones), as well as its unusual architecture and fashion. However, it lacks any fantasy or science fiction elements, which suggests that the comic is closer to the alternate history genre.

The webcomic has received various awards since its start in 2005.

== Development ==
Spike Trotman started created Templar, Arizona on June 5, 2005, and she ended the series unfinished, in the middle of an action sequence, on September 29, 2014.

Before Kickstarter came into popularity, Trotman implemented PayPal and similar online banking services to set up an independent pre-ordering system for Templar, Arizona.

== Characters ==
- Templar is a large city in northeastern Arizona, on the banks of a dried-up river.
- Benjamin Kowalski is a recent transplant to Templar, previously hailing from Yakima. He is short, highly intelligent, and quiet. He recently started a new job writing for the city newspaper, the Templar Crusade. An adoptee from South Korea, Ben came to Arizona to escape yet-undefined conflicts in his home life.
- Reagan Mancuso lives in the same apartment building as Ben. She is large, highly intelligent, and pushy, and seemingly takes pride in her obnoxiousness. Ray works for a highly suspect retail store named Kingdom Come, and dresses like a drag queen.
- Eugene Carmichael lives in the apartment above Ben's. He is tattooed, possibly mildly intellectually disabled due to near-suffocation during birth, and mercifully free from the pressures of grace. Gene is also the only member of his considerably large family with hair - the rest shave their heads as part of their Jakeskin (as in "Jake's kin") philosophy and speak in a cryptic philosophical manner, especially Gene's mother, who waxes poetic about Gene's youth and her choices in raising him. He was named for the French romantic painter Eugène Delacroix (in keeping with the Jake idea of "keeping names alive") and plays in the popular local band Borndown.
- Zoradysis Carmichael is Gene's daughter. She is six years old, smarter than her dad, and uncontrolled. She just went to school for the first time. Zora has recently shaved her head in keeping with her family's Jake traditions.
- Scipio Spencer (pronounced "Skippy-o") is a friend of Reagan. He is unusually tall, well-read, and easily frustrated. Scip is heavily influenced by eastern philosophy, especially Buddhism. He works as a "close-protection officer" (read: bodyguard), wears a kilt, and has a pet chicken named Flora.
- Thutmose Shen, who goes simply by "Moze", is a musician in the band Borndown with Gene. He's overweight, hirsute, perpetually smiling, and extremely libidinous. He owns an ugly pug dog named Goblin. He is a Nile Revivalist, but as with all things he seems not to take it too seriously.
- Ra Shen, who violently enforces his preferred moniker of "Sunny", is the drummer and manager of Borndown. A former Diesel (illegal underground hockey) player, he entered the music business after sustaining a severe injury. Profane, opinionated, and intense, he is an interesting counterpoint to Gene and Moze. Like his cousin Moze, he, too, is a Nile Revivalist, albeit nonpracticing.
- Epiphany de la Cruz, a.k.a. "Pippi", is a troubled, standoffish high-school student and Scip's roommate. She has an impressive rap sheet and closely follows Templar's TV personalities.
- Doctor Eli Bash lives in a basement apartment in Ben's building. He is an extremely eccentric man with an unspecified doctorate. He is new to the building, and his room is full of unpacked boxes which contain antique medical sculptures which he has collected over the years. Doctor Bash is in the process of separating from his wife, an affluent woman from The Sorrows, a rich area of town. The pair have at least two children together, a son named Ransom and a daughter named Cascade, who Bash calls "Cassie." It was Cassie who sent the antiques to Doctor Bash, possibly in an attempt to keep her mother from selling them.
- Heather Anne Morgan, a.k.a. "Morgan", is a freckled, red-haired woman from Nebraska. Works for the magazine Pandorea, and has a fascination with space.
- The Elliots: Elliot "Biggs" Bigelow and Elliot James "EJ" Adair. An addict and his dependent, angry companion. Have recently run into trouble with Eugene's family, the Jakeskin.
- Tuesday Pryor: One of the television personalities in the city of Templar. Lives on King Street, an upper-crust section of Templar. Has a frienemy relationship with Curio, another girl on King Street. Her mother works at Pandorea.
- Curio Pepper: Real name: Prabhjot Kaur. Another girl who lives on King Street, and a "friend" of Tuesday's.
- Jakeskin: A survivalist religious group, and Eugene's family. Most are shaved bald, and tend to wield butcher knives.

== Recognition ==
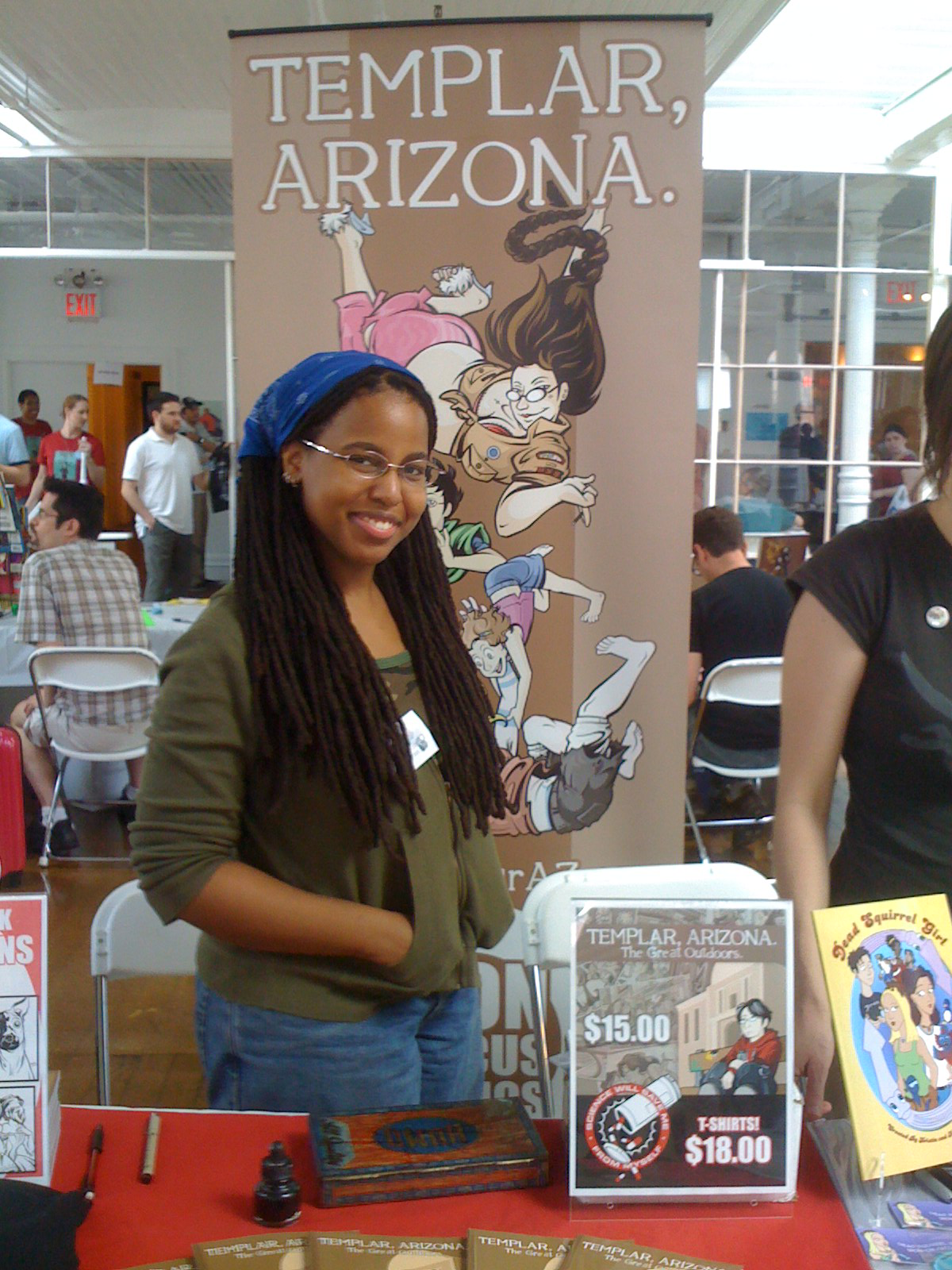
Trotman displaying Templar, Arizona at the MOCCA festival in June, 2008

Templar has been praised for its natural and humorous dialogue, the strength of its character design (both visually and in personality), the depth of its setting, and for the quality of its art. The writing has distinct speech patterns for each of the cast members.

Templar, Arizona was named as one of the best webcomics of 2005 by The Webcomics Examiner. Nominated for the 2006 Web Cartoonists' Choice Awards in the categories "Outstanding New Character Design", "Outstanding Environment Design", "Outstanding Character Writing", "Outstanding Long Form Comic", and "Outstanding Story Concept", it won in the "Character Design" and "Character Writing" categories.

In the 2007 Glyph Comics Awards, Trotman won the Rising Star Award for Templar, Arizona.
