= Caroline C. Hayes =

American roboticist

Caroline Clarke Hayes is an American computer scientist, roboticist, and mechanical engineer whose research concerns agent-based models, human–computer interaction, intelligent decision support systems, and more generally “the interface between people and technology for complex tasks”. She is Lynn Gleason Professor of Interdisciplinary Engineering at Iowa State University, where she chairs the Department of Mechanical Engineering.

== Education and career ==
Hayes was educated at Carnegie Mellon University, where she earned a bachelor’s degree in computer science in 1983, a master’s degree in knowledge-based systems in 1987, and a Ph.D. in robotics in 1990. Her dissertation, Machine Planning: A Model of an Expert Level Planning Process, was supervised by Subhas Desa.

She became a faculty member at the University of Illinois Urbana-Champaign and then in the Department of Mechanical Engineering at the University of Minnesota before joining Iowa State University in 2012 as Lynn Gleason Professor of Interdisciplinary Engineering and chair of mechanical engineering. Her position as chair was renewed for a third five-year term in 2022.

== Book ==
With Christopher A. Miller, Hayes is coauthor of the book Human–Computer Etiquette: Cultural Expectations and the Design Implications They Place on Computers and Technology (Auerbach Publications, 2010).

== Recognition ==
Hayes was named as an ASME Fellow in 2013.
