= Spike Trotman =

American cartoonist and publisher (born 1978)

C. Spike Trotman
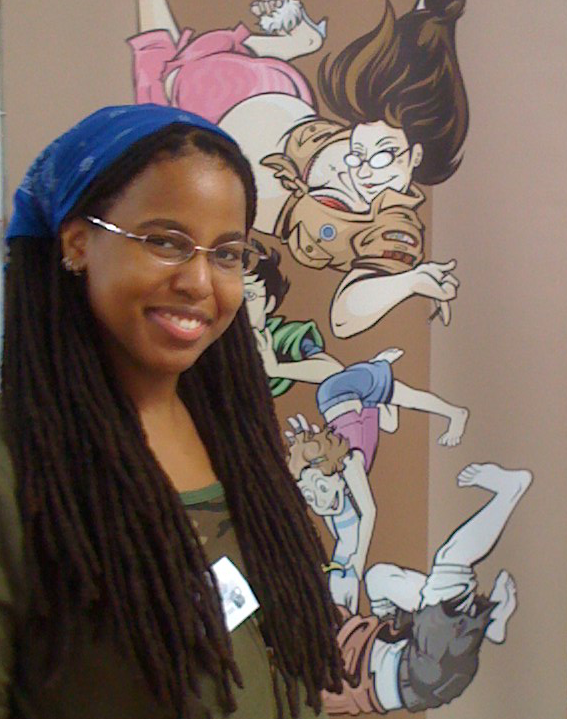
- Trotman and her Templar characters at the 2008 MoCCA Festival in New York City
- Born: Charlie Spike Trotman; November 18, 1978 (age 48) Washington, D.C., U.S.
- Areas: Cartoonist, publisher, editor
- Notable works: Templar, Arizona; Smut Peddler
- Awards: Glyph Comics Award, 2007

Charlie Spike Trotman, also known as C. Spike Trotman (born November 18, 1978), is an American cartoonist and publisher known for creating the long-running web comic Templar, Arizona, and for publishing the Smut Peddler anthologies of what she describes as "lady centric porn". She is the founder and owner of Iron Circus Comics, an indie comics publisher which Forbes described as "a powerhouse of the indy landscape."

== Early and personal life ==
Growing up in her hometown Potomac, Maryland, Trotman was a fan of Bloom County, Calvin and Hobbes, The Far Side, Power Pack, and Excalibur comic strips in the Sunday Washington Post newspaper. She attended Spelman College (1996–2000), where she received a bachelor's degree in Fine and Studio Arts; Trotman then attended the School of the Art Institute of Chicago (2000–2001). Her work centered on relationships and culture, and erotica. She also self-published on the web. She married Matt Sheridan, the author she collaborated with on Sparkneedle in 2004.

== Career ==
Her first notable online publications were Sparkneedle and Lucas and Odessa, which she began serializing on Girlamatic in 2003. Trotman released Templar, Arizona in 2005.

In 2007, she founded Iron Circus Comics, a Chicago-based alternative comics publisher that was described by the Chicago Tribune as a pioneer in the industry for bringing queer-friendly fantasy, sci-fi, and erotica books to market and publishing underrepresented artists. She told the Chicago Tribune that increasing diversity and representation in comics was part of her motivation for starting Iron Circus Comics: "When I was getting into comics, there was absolutely no room for people like me — people of color who wanted to tell their own stories, or women who wanted to tell their own stories. Comics had a very firm idea of what would sell or what qualified as niche. Anything a white, heterosexual man would make would be interpreted to having universal appeal, but anything I would make would automatically be classified as difficult to relate to or niche.”

Iron Circus has published over 30 titles, including The Less Than Epic Adventures of T.J. and Amal by E. K. Weaver and Shadoweyes by Sophie Campbell. Trotman created The Sleep of Reason (a horror anthology), New World, The Smut Peddler series, and Poorcraft: The Funnybook Fundamentals of Living Well on Less, an instructional book illustrated by Diana Nock. In 2012, she revived the title Smut Peddler, first published by Johanna D. Carlson and Trisha L. Sebastian in 2003, created by women, primarily for a female readership. In Kickstarter's first year, she funded a print edition of the book, Poorcraft: The Funnybook Fundamentals of Living Well on Less. In 2022, Iron Circus Comics published The Poorcraft Cookbook, illustrated by Nero Villagallos O'Reilly based on characters developed by Trotman.

Trotman is known for integrating crowdfunding into her publishing company's business model. Trotman "built a comic book publisher from the ground up," with Iron Circus Comics raising over $2.5 million over its first 30 Kickstarter campaigns. Trotman moved away from using Kickstarter to an independent crowdsourcing platform after Kickstarter announced it would migrate to using blockchain technology.

== Selected works ==
- Templar, Arizona (2005) – The comic is an alternative history webcomic set in a fictional Arizona town. It focuses on ancient religions and survival cults, with a diverse cast of characters, relationships, cultures, and romances.
- Smut Peddler (2014 and 2016) – An anthology featuring erotic comics. The stories focused on varying sexual preferences often with science-fiction or fantasy themes. Works featured in Smut Peddler involved sexual variety and consensual relationships. Male cartoonists were permitted to work on stories, but only as part of a team involving at least one-woman creator.
- Yes, Roya (2016) – Story revolves around an emerging artist who gets invited by a famed cartoonist named Roya (who publishes under her husband's name) to review his art portfolio. The invitation eventually leads to the artist discovering the cartoonist's fetish art and exploring his sexuality with Roya and her husband. The story contains themes of consenual boundary crossing and professional and sexual submission and domination through a ethical lens.

== Recognition and awards ==
Publishers Weekly named Trotman a "Star to Watch" in 2015, recognizing her as a "go-to source for best practices on crowdfunding."

In April 2018, Kickstarter named Trotman as one of the seven Kickstarter Thought Leaders invited to lead talks and host community events.

She won the Rising Star Award for Templar Arizona in the 2007 Glyph Comics Awards. She was a juror the Small Press Expo's Ignatz Awards in 2016.
