= Joe Turner (writer) =

Andrew "Joe" Turner is a British script writer working in the fields of radio and television. His credits include the 2006 BBC version of Robin Hood (his episode featured Charles Dale), episodes of Holby City and Casualty.

Originally an actor, he featured in the BBC television production of The Lion, the Witch and the Wardrobe.

He has written extensively for radio, with nine plays including 20th Century Vampire, My Supply Teacher is an Alien, My Sister is a World Class Kleptomaniac and Old Dog and Partridge.

Turner lives with his family in Abergavenny, Monmouthshire.

== Coronation Street ==
Turner has been a writer for ITV's long-running soap opera Coronation Street since March 1999. For the past few years he has been given the Christmas Day episode to write, which usually is one of the most important episodes in a specific plot.

In 1997, Joe's work won Best Children's Drama award at the British Comedy Awards for the children's comedy show My Dad's a Boring Nerd which starred Coronation Street actors Julia Haworth and Alan Halsall.

Joe also holds the record for most expensive soap episode in soap history. His 'Tram Crash' episode cost well over a million pounds to produce and it was broadcast in 2010.
