= Jenny Murray =

American actress and filmmaker

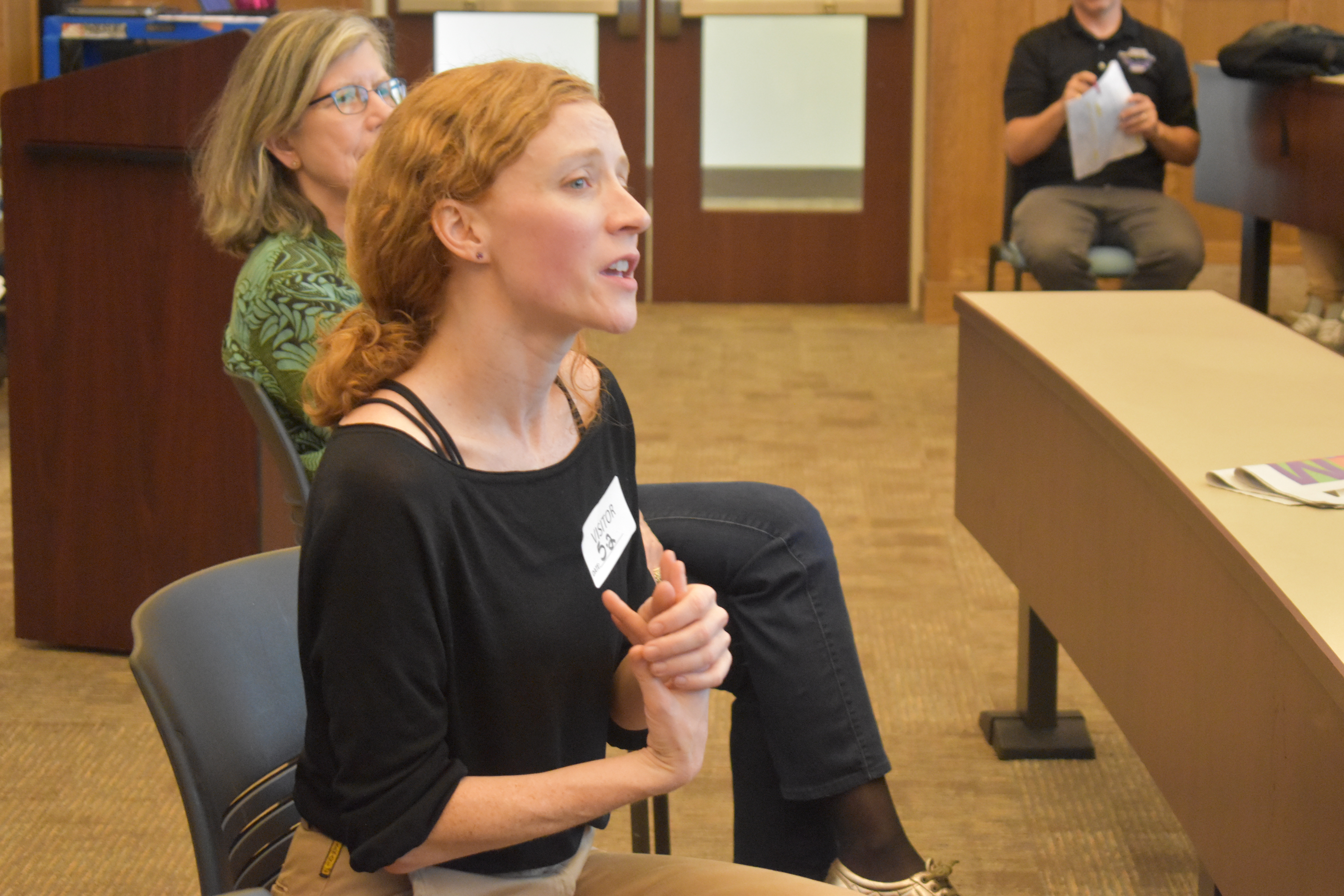
Jenny Murray at the Cardozo Education Campus, Washington, D.C., 2019

Jennifer Elizabeth Murray (known as Jenny Murray) is an American filmmaker and researcher. She has made multiple short films, and wrote, directed, edited, and produced ¡Las Sandinistas! (2018), a feature documentary about women who led combat and implemented social reforms in Nicaragua during the 1979 Sandinista Revolution and the subsequent Contra War in the 1980s.

== Biography ==
She graduated from Columbia University in New York, where she studied film, philosophy, Latin American history, and photography. Murray is 'an Irish girl from Chicago,' as she put it herself.

In order to fund her filmmaking, Murray has worked many jobs in film, television, fashion (for Marc Jacobs collection) and as a licensed associate on Watermill's stock trading desk in New York. She started her career by helping friends make short film projects, including working and collaborating artistically with college friends on music videos for their band Vampire Weekend She acted in high school and college friends’ student and independent films as a way to help out and learn about filmmaking before starting to make her own short films.

She directed two short films – Last Chance, Bonne Chance (2013), a short film produced and created with her friend Zonia Pelensky. The film tells the story of two young women who want to escape their lives in New York and to accomplish that commit a crime. She then made a second film, The Night to Make Believe (2014), a short drama.

In 2018 she released her first feature documentary film, ¡Las Sandinistas!, about women who led combat and implemented social reforms in Nicaragua in the Sandinista Revolution, in 1979, and during the subsequent Contra war in the 1980s, which saw them having to fight again for equality within and under the Sandinista government. Murray wrote, directed, edited and produced the documentary, spending several years researching, interviewing and shooting. The film has been screened at a number of venues and has won several awards, including a Special Jury Recognition award at SXSW, where it was nominated for the Grand Jury prize, as well as two prizes at Brazil’s São Paulo International Film Festival, including the Best Foreign Documentary and Best Film in the New Director’s Competition.

Murray has spoken to audiences about the film in many places across the world including at Harvard’s Kennedy School, at the University of California, Santa Barbara, and on CNN International.

In recent years, Murray has also worked as a publicist in Los Angeles and as a researcher on the films and television projects of other writers and directors, usually co-writing or researching scripts for historical or political dramas or biographies.
