= Dave Sheasby =

David Sheasby (20 September 1940 – 26 February 2010) was a playwright, director, dramatist and radio producer who was based in Sheffield, England.

The son of a building engineer, Sheasby was born in Fulwood, Sheffield. He was educated at King Edward VII School, where he was a county-standard cross-country runner. The only time he lived outside Sheffield was when he went to the London School of Economics to read history. Sheasby also trained as a teacher. Dave Sheasby's first wife, Helen Grainger, died from a brain tumour and in 2004 he married Eve Shrewsbury, who survives him along with three children from each marriage. They lived in the heart of Nether Edge.

He started his radio career in 1967 at Radio Sheffield as education producer and from 1988 onwards, worked for BBC Radio 4. In addition to his work for the BBC, from 2002 to 2004 he taught Media Studies and Creative Writing at University of Leeds as Royal Literary Fund fellow and taught Media Studies and Creative Writing at University of Warwick as Royal Literary Fund fellow between 2004 until his death in 2010.

His work includes a number of original plays and comedies including Apple Blossom Afternoon, which in 1988 won a Giles Cooper Award, The Blackburn Files and Street and Lane. His dramatisations of Erich Maria Remarque's novel All Quiet on the Western Front in 2008 and Kurt Vonnegut's science fiction novel Slaughterhouse-Five in 2009 were also critically acclaimed.

At the time of his death, he had just completed an adaptation of J.L. Carr's novel A Month in the Country. He completed the dramatisation in a hospice bed with a borrowed laptop. It was broadcast as the Saturday Play in November 2010.
