= Olan Rogers =

American filmmaker and comedian (born 1987)

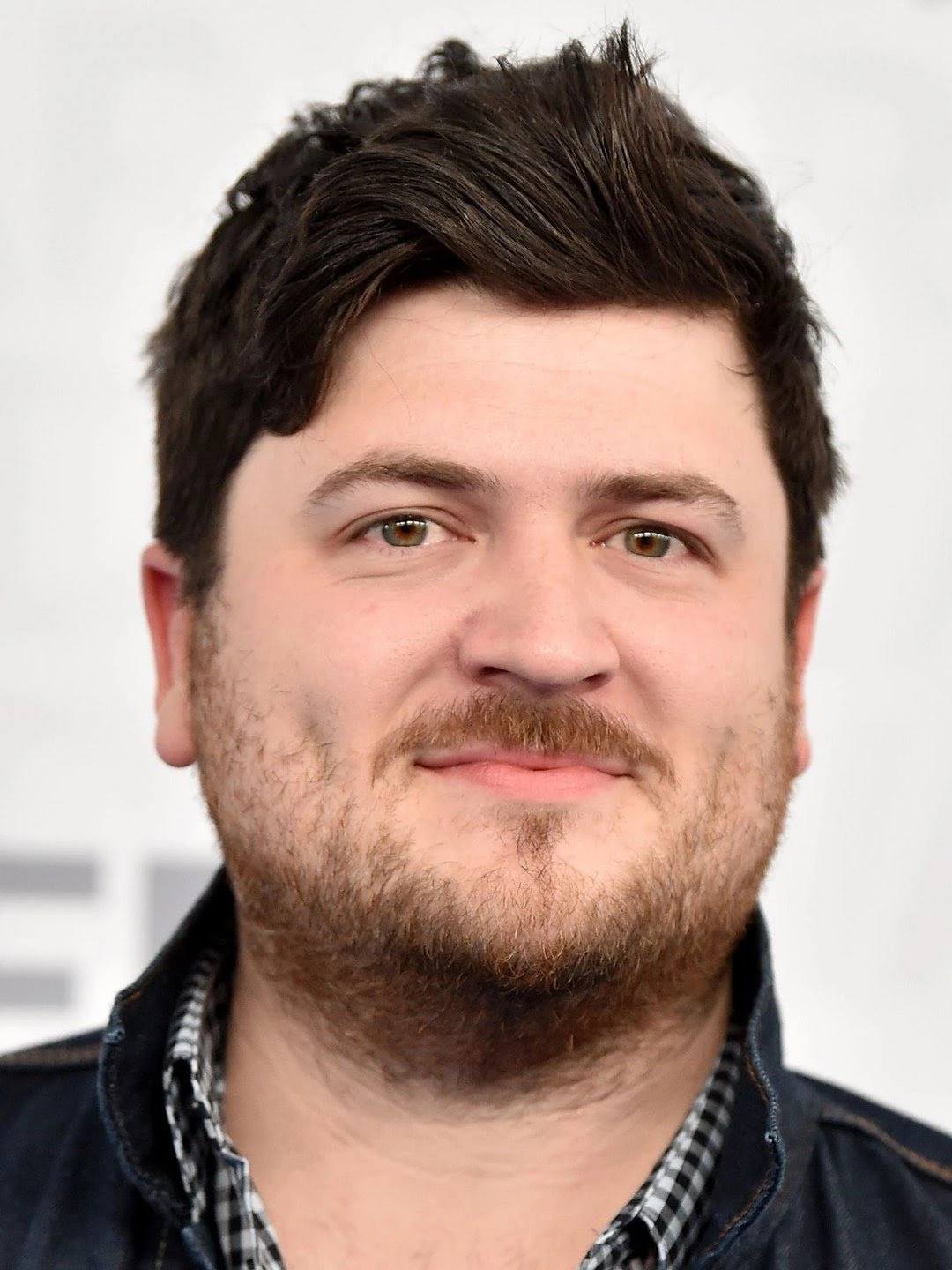
- Rogers in 2024
- Born: Thomas Olan Rogers; June 11, 1987 (age 39); Nashville, Tennessee, U.S.
- Education: University of Memphis
- Occupations: Filmmaker, comedian, actor, author, YouTuber
- Years active: 2005–present

Thomas Olan Rogers (born June 11, 1987) is an American filmmaker, comedian, actor, and YouTuber. He is the creator, executive producer, and star of the TBS and Adult Swim animated television series Final Space. He is also known for co-founding the independent animation studio Lightfold.

== Career ==
Rogers started his career on Myspace and YouTube alongside two Collierville High School and University of Memphis friends (Thomas Gore & Joss Pursley, formerly Joshua Pursley) in the comedy trio BalloonShop, known for their comedic sketches and shorts. After transitioning to his solo channel, Rogers uploaded videos of his own sketches as well as humorous stories of his life, short films, and even several animated shorts.

In 2015, after lamenting his inability to meet with fans as often as he liked, Rogers opened a lounge called "The Soda Parlor" in Nashville, which offered arcade games and various desserts. The Parlor was later hit by a tornado in March 2020, and then looted in the aftermath, with Rogers saying that he was unsure of the obstacles moving forward, extent of damage, and he started a GoFundMe account to pay for the damage, which raised above $8,000 by March 3, 2020.

His channel reached 1,000,000 subscribers on March 26, 2019, but entered long periods of inactivity, which Olan later explained was a result of coming to terms with numerous personal troubles, including the destruction of the Parlor, and the death of his cat, Starscream.

=== Final Space ===
In 2016, he created a pilot that became the animated television show, Final Space. The series followed a rogue astronaut named Gary, and his sidekick, a planet-destroying alien named Mooncake, both of whom Rogers voiced. 10 episodes were released between February and April 2018 on TBS. The series was later added to Netflix overseas. A second season was released in 2019 on Adult Swim. Season 3 premiered on March 20, 2021. Rogers ran the social media accounts for the show, including the official Twitter account, calling it a "good opportunity" to connect with fans.

However, in September 2022, Rogers revealed that Final Space would be leaving Netflix internationally in 2023, as part of a group of properties being written off by Warner Bros. Discovery for tax purposes. Due to this, Season 3 would not be receive any physical copies and all mention of the show would be erased from the platform. Nevertheless, Rogers promised that he would continue fighting for the show to get a proper ending, under the hashtag "#renewfinalspace", while wearing a t-shirt describing the series as a tax write off. This eventually led to WB offering Olan a one-time license to publish a physical graphic novel for Final Space's ending, with the novel releasing in 2024 at a price of $125 per copy.

=== Godspeed and future plans ===
In June 2022, Rogers uploaded a trailer for his next project, an animation titled Godspeed, turning to Kickstarter to help fund it. The campaign was funded in just two hours, hitting 580% of its original goal. The official Godspeed website later clarified that after various fees and cuts, the Kickstarter money could not fund a full-length film, so it would be a single episode instead. Production on Godspeed began on January 9, 2023.

The final product featured voice actors such as Troy Baker, Claudia Black, Coty Galloway, and Rogers himself, described positively as having "some potential" and showing "another example of the appetite for independent adult animation." It premiered on YouTube on December 15 2023. Additionally, the Final Space graphic novel, which concludes his previous series, was also confirmed to release in 2024.

Following a rising trend of YouTube's older content creators stepping back from the platform in 2024, Rogers himself announced in February that he would be moving on to other passions outside his usual content range. Rogers' new ventures include a stand-up special in collaboration with Patreon, and a ghost-hunting series called Haunt Hounds with his longtime friend and BalloonShop co-creator Thomas Gore, as well as Brett Driver and Seth Tyler Jackson.

As of November 2024, Rogers is working as a writer for Glitch Productions, which he did an interview with the company earlier that month for their GlitchX annual event. It was later announced, on October 10, 2025, that he would be a development executive on a series being co-produced by Glitch, in collaboration with Iron Circus, which will adapt the Lackadaisy film into a full series with six episodes, each of which is 22 minutes long.

In August 2026 it was announced that Rogers' indie animation studio, Lightfold, would be partnering with Flying Bark Productions, an animation studio, along with Forrester Kane, as a producer and Sarah Harper as showrunner, on an original horror comedy named Doomsweepers.

== Filmography ==
=== Feature films ===
Year	Title	Role	Notes
2011	New Prime	Valavingee / Ferris / Daniels / Zak McSleuthburger / Bob	Also director, writer, producer, executive producer
2016	The Matchbreaker	Mitchell	

=== Other media ===
Year	Title	Role	Notes
2005–2010	Hazard/BalloonShop	Himself	Also director
2008	"In a Cave" (Tokyo Police Club)	Himself	Music video; also director
2011	Annoying Orange	Meteortron	1 episode only
2014	As Dreamers Do	Walt Disney	
2015	Oscar's Hotel for Fantastical Creatures	Box Death	
2016–2017	Mr. Student Body President	Mr. Bayblock	
2017	Ear Biscuits	Himself	1 episode only
2018	Conan	Himself	1 episode only
2018–2021	Final Space	Gary Goodspeed / Mooncake / Tribore Menendez / Biskit / Additional Voices	Also creator, director, executive producer
2023–present	Godspeed	Bowie	Also creator, writer, executive producer
2024	Haunt Hounds	Himself	Also creator, director, executive producer
2025	Atlantis Rocks	Manny	
TBA	Lackadaisy		Co-Executive Producer
TBA	Untitled project with Disney+		
TBA	Untitled project with Amazon Prime Video		

=== Video games ===
Year	Title	Role
2022	Final Space: The Rescue	Gary Goodspeed / Mooncake / Tribore Menendez

=== Books ===
Year	Title	Notes
2024	Forward As Always	Co-Author
2026	Final Space: The Final Chapter	
