= List of animation studios =

This is a list of animation studios, including notable companies and organizations principally dedicated to the production and distribution of animated films. Such studios may be actual production facilities or corporate entities.

The United States is the global leader in high-end 3D computer animation and major theatrical franchises, home to industry giants like Walt Disney Animation Studios, Pixar Animation Studios, 20th Century Animation, DreamWorks Animation, Sony Pictures Animation, Illumination, Warner Bros. Pictures Animation and Paramount Animation. Major U.S. animation studios produce the world's highest-grossing movies, consistently delivering blockbuster hits that generate billions of dollars in global box office revenue.

Japan dominates the global 2D animation market through its prolific "anime" industry, with studios such as Studio Ghibli, Toei Animation, Madhouse, Production I.G and MAPPA driving massive international demand and record-breaking export revenues.

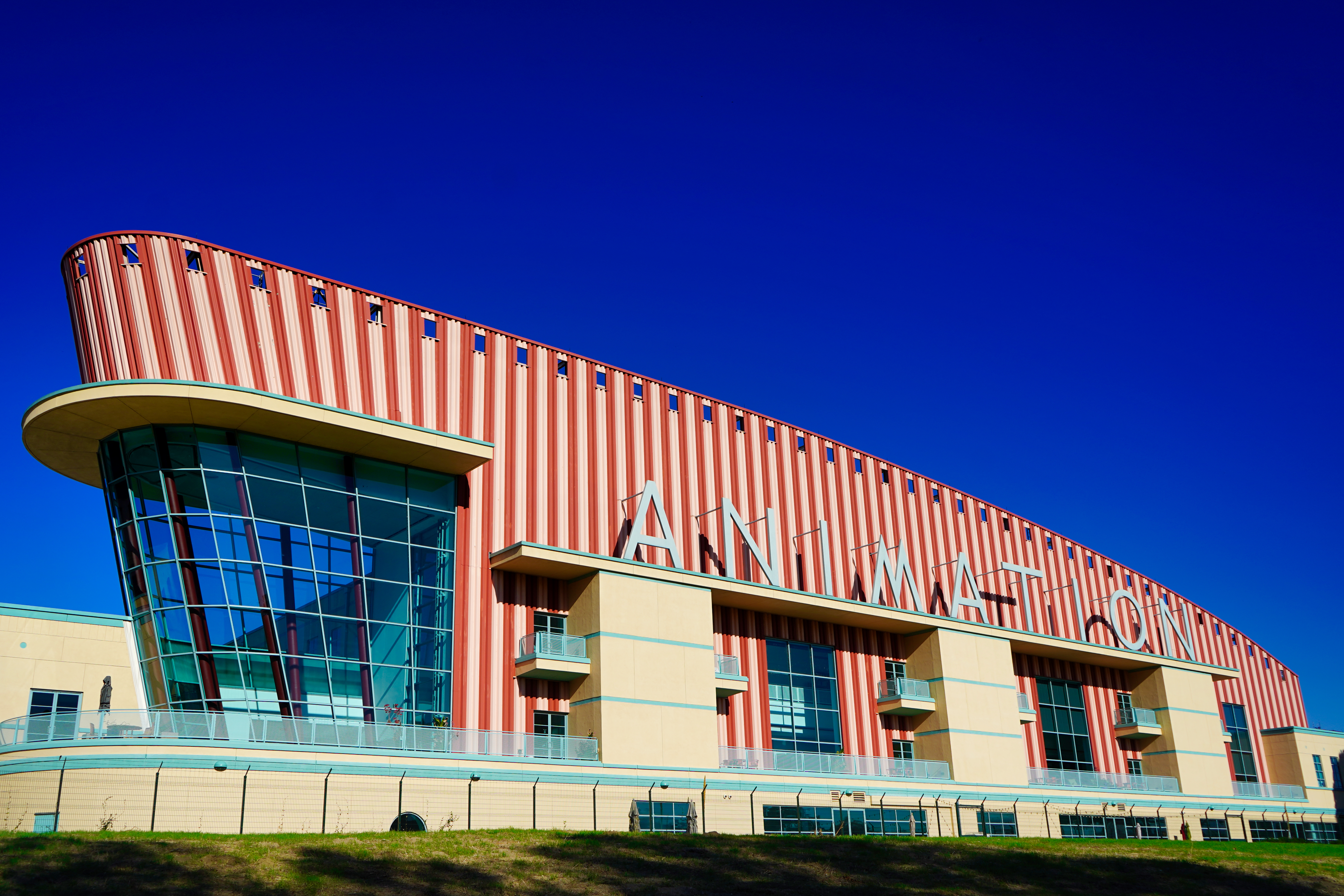
Walt Disney Animation Studios produced the first animated feature film, Snow White and the Seven Dwarfs, establishing the foundation for the global animation industry.

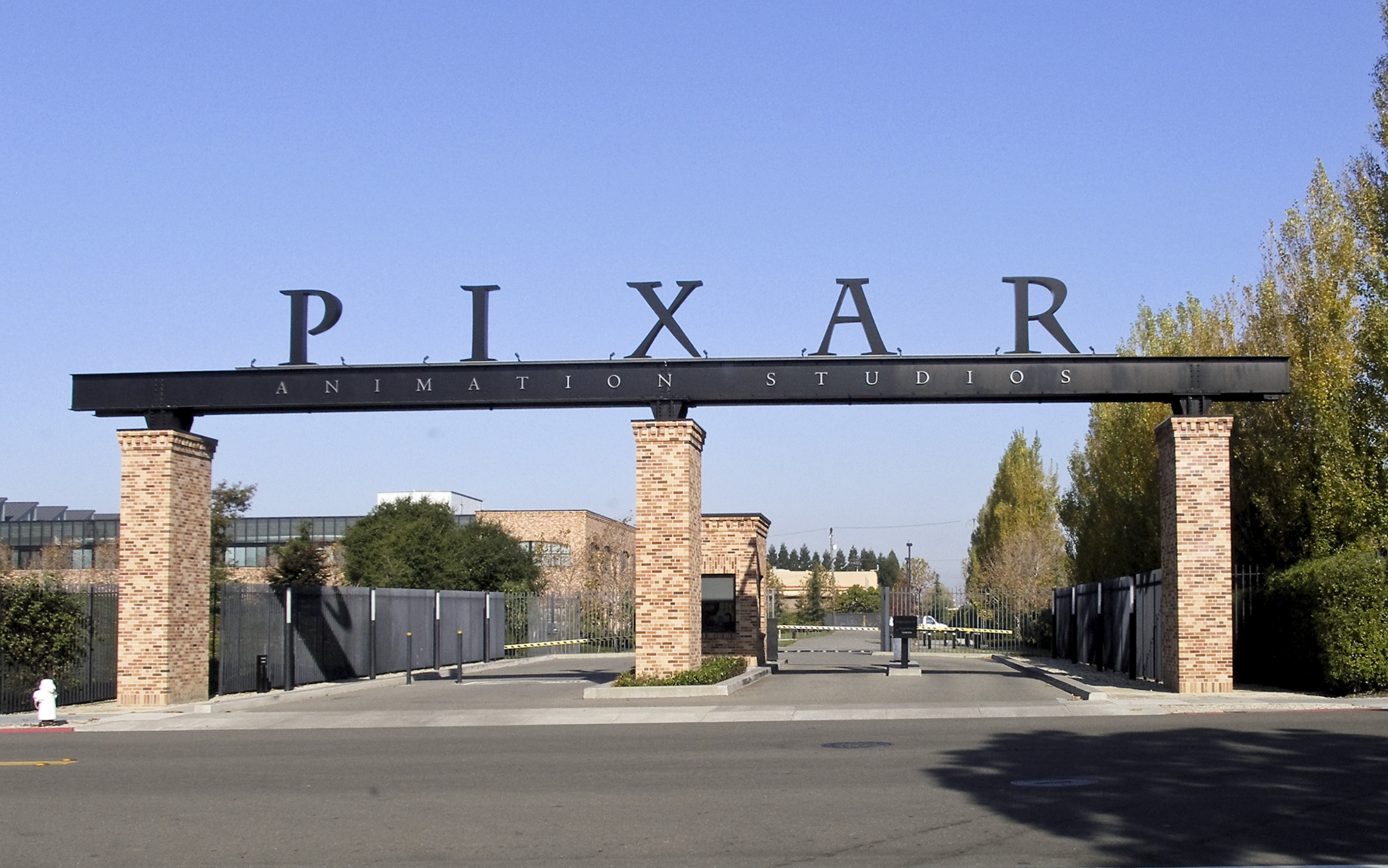
Pixar Animation Studios was a pioneer in digital filmmaking that produced the first fully computer-animated feature film, Toy Story, significantly influencing the direction of modern animation.

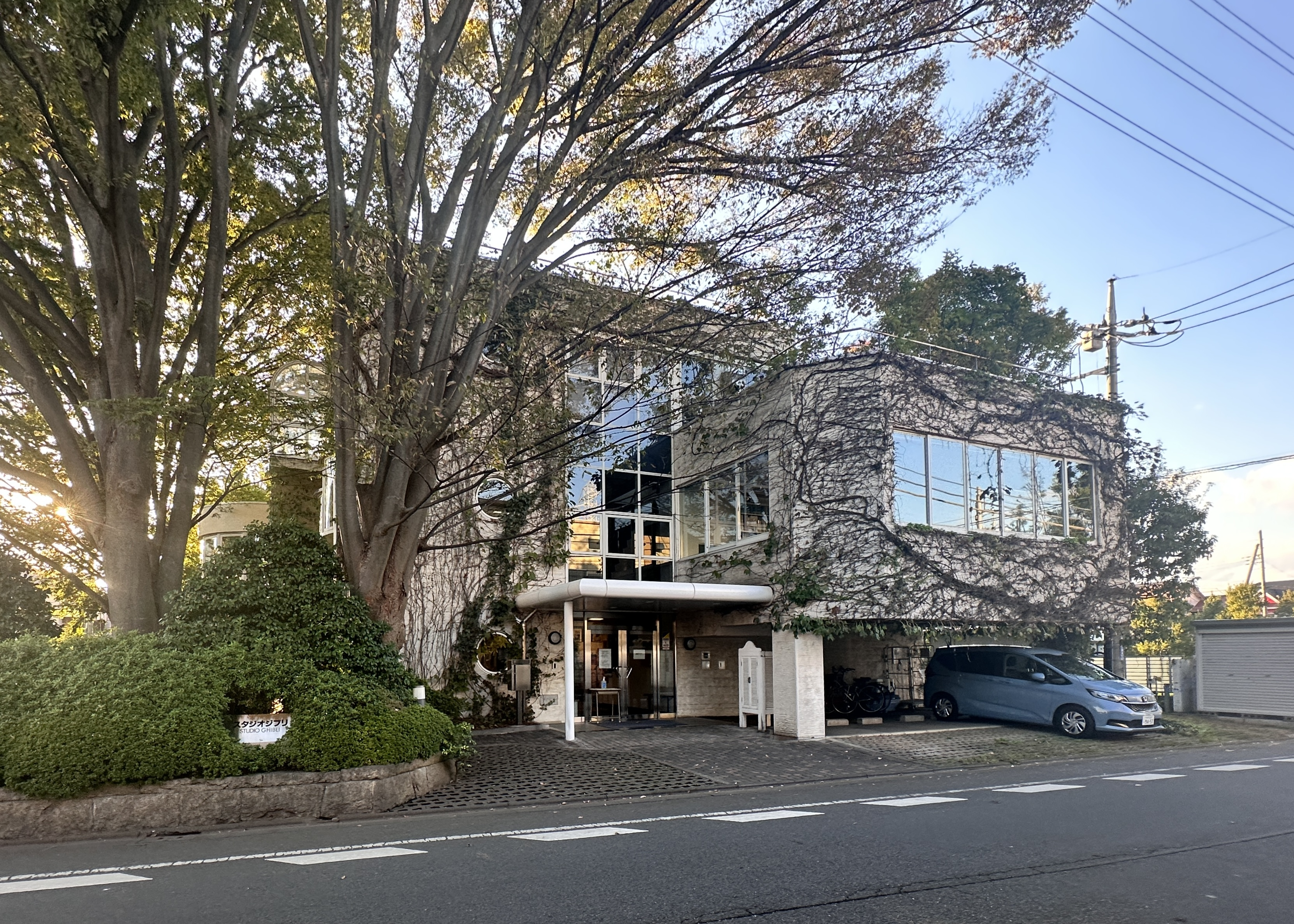
Studio Ghibli is the only Japanese animation studio to win the Academy Award for Best Animated Feature, receiving the honor for both Spirited Away and The Boy and the Heron.

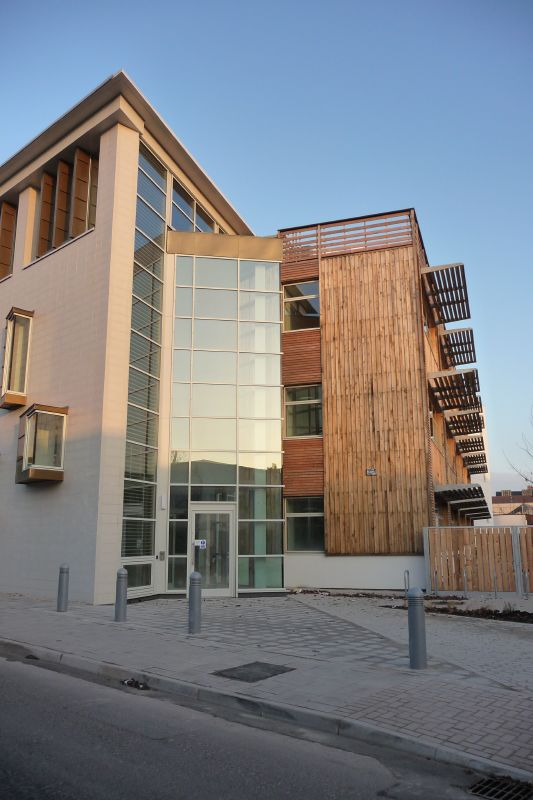
Aardman Animations produced Chicken Run, the highest-grossing stop-motion animated film of all time, and is the only British studio to win the Academy Award for Best Animated Feature.

== Active studios ==
| Country | Studio | Founded | Notes and sources |
|---|---|---|---|
| Australia | Act3animation | 1992 | |
| Australia | Choc Chip Animation Studios | 2020 | |
| Australia | Flying Bark Productions | 1967 | |
| Australia | Glitch Productions | 2017 | |
| Australia | Honeydew Studios | 2009 | |
| Australia | The People's Republic of Animation | 2003 | |
| Australia | Plastic Wax | 1997 | |
| Australia | Princess Bento Studio | 2020 | |
| Australia | SLR Productions | 2002 | |
| Australia | SpindleRoo | 2025 | |
| Australia | Studio Joho | 2009 | |
| Belgium | nWave Pictures | 1994 | |
| Brazil | Copa Studio | 2009 | |
| Brazil | PinGuim Content | 1989 | Formerly TV PinGuim |
| Brazil | 2DLab | 1998 | Formerly Laboratório de Desenhos |
| Brazil | Video Brinquedo | 1994 | |
| Canada | A.k.a. Cartoon | 1994 | |
| Canada | Atomic Cartoons | 1999 | |
| Canada | Bardel Entertainment | 1987 | Subsidiary of Rainbow |
| Canada | Big Bad Boo | 2005 | |
| Canada | CinéGroupe | 1974 | Also has offices in Los Angeles, California, United States |
| Canada | Cinesite | 1991 | Also based in the United Kingdom |
| Canada | Cuppa Coffee Studio | 1992 | |
| Canada | Cinesite Animation | 2016 | |
| Canada | Global Mechanic | 1995 | |
| Canada | Guru Studios | 2000 | |
| Canada | Image Engine | 1995 | Partner of Cinesite |
| Canada | Jam Filled Toronto | 1985 | Formerly Dan Krech Productions, DKP Studios, Starz Animation, Arc Productions |
| Canada | Mainframe Entertainment | 1993 | Formerly Rainmaker Entertainment |
| Canada | Mercury Filmworks | 1997 | |
| Canada | National Film Board of Canada | 1939 | |
| Canada | Nelvana | 1971 | |
| Canada | Nitrogen Studios | 2003 | |
| Canada | Rovio Animation | 2012 | |
| Canada | Skycron | 2001 | |
| Canada | Slap Happy Cartoons | 2004 | |
| Canada | WildBrain Ltd. | 2006 | Formerly DHX Media Ltd. |
| Canada | WildBrain Studios | 2016 | Formerly DHX Studios Vancouver. Merger of former Studio B Productions and Nerd Corps Entertainment assets. |
| Canada | Yowza! Animation | 1996 | |
| Chile | Punkrobot | 2008 | |
| China | Base FX | 2003 | |
| China | Chengdu Coco Cartoon | 2009 | |
| China | China Film Animation | 1999 | |
| China | Creative Power Entertaining | 2004 | |
| China | Fantawild Animation | 2008 | |
| China | Haoliners Animation League | 2013 | |
| China | Light Chaser Animation Studios | 2013 | |
| China | Pearl Studio | 2012 | Formerly Oriental DreamWorks. |
| China | Shanghai Animation Film Studio | 1957 | |
| China | Sparx* | 1995 | Also based in Vietnam; HQ in France |
| China | Vasoon Animation | 1992 | |
| Croatia | Zagreb Film | 1953 | |
| Denmark | A. Film Production | 1988 | |
| Denmark | Sun Creature Studio | 2014 | |
| France | Ankama | 2001 | |
| France | Bobbypills | 2017 | |
| France | Def2shoot | 2002 | |
| France | Ellipsanime | 1987 | Formerly known as Le Studio Ellipse; property of Dargaud, Inc. |
| France | Folimage | 1981 | |
| France | Futurikon | 1996 | |
| France | Gaumont Animation | 1997 | Formerly known as Alphanim |
| France | H5 | 1994 | |
| France | Illumination Studios Paris | 2011 | |
| France | Les Armateurs | 1994 | |
| France | Mac Guff | 1988 | Also based in United States |
| France | Millimages | 1990 | |
| France | Sav! The World Productions | 1998 | |
| France | Studio La Cachette | 2014 | |
| France | TeamTO | 2005 | |
| France | Xilam | 1999 | |
| France | ZAG Entertainment | 2009 | |
| Hungary | Digic Pictures | 2001 | |
| India | Assemblage Entertainment | 2013 | |
| India | Future Thought Productions | 1997 | |
| India | Green Gold Animation | 2001 | |
| India | Lumicel Animation Studios | 2009 | |
| India | Makuta VFX | 2010 | |
| India | Pentamedia Graphics | 1998 | |
| India | Vaibhav Studios | 2003 | |
| Ireland | Boulder Media Limited | 2000 | |
| Ireland | Brown Bag Films | 1994 | |
| Ireland | Cartoon Saloon | 1999 | |
| Israel | Crew972 | 2005 | |
| Israel | The Hive | 2010 | |
| Italy | Mondo TV | 1985 | |
| Italy | Rainbow S.p.A. | 1994 | Co-owned by Paramount Global from 2011 to 2023 |
| Japan | 100studio | 2021 | |
| Japan | 8-Bit | 2008 | |
| Japan | A-1 Pictures | 2005 | |
| Japan | A.C.G.T | 2001 | |
| Japan | Actas | 1998 | |
| Japan | Ajiado | 1978 | |
| Japan | AIC | 1982 | |
| Japan | Asahi Production | 1973 | |
| Japan | Ashi Production | 1975 | Also known as Production Reed |
| Japan | Asread | 2003 | |
| Japan | Atelier Pontdarc | 2020 | |
| Japan | AXsiZ | 2011 | |
| Japan | Bandai Namco Pictures | 2015 | |
| Japan | Bee Train | 1997 | |
| Japan | Benten Film | 2015 | |
| Japan | Bibury Animation Studios | 2017 | |
| Japan | Blade | 1990 | |
| Japan | Blue Lynx | 2019 | |
| Japan | Bones | 1998 | |
| Japan | Brain's Base | 1996 | |
| Japan | Bridge | 2007 | |
| Japan | Bug Films | 2021 | |
| Japan | C2C | 2006 | |
| Japan | C-Station | 2009 | |
| Japan | Chaos Project | 1995 | |
| Japan | Children's Playground Entertainment | 2010 | |
| Japan | CloverWorks | 2018 | |
| Japan | CoMix Wave Films | 2007 | |
| Japan | Connect | 2012 | |
| Japan | Creators in Pack | 2013 | |
| Japan | Cypic | 2016 | |
| Japan | David Production | 2007 | |
| Japan | Digital Frontier | 2000 | |
| Japan | Diomedea | 2005 | |
| Japan | DLE | 2001 | |
| Japan | Doga Kobo | 1973 | |
| Japan | Domerica | 2012 | |
| Japan | Drive | 2015 | |
| Japan | E&H Production | 2021 | |
| Japan | East Fish Studio | 2017 | |
| Japan | Eight Bit | 2008 | |
| Japan | Eiken | 1969 | |
| Japan | EMT Squared | 2013 | |
| Japan | Encourage Films | 2008 | |
| Japan | ENGI | 2018 | |
| Japan | Ezóla | 2018 | |
| Japan | Fanworks | 2005 | |
| Japan | Feel | 2002 | |
| Japan | Felix Film | 2014 | |
| Japan | Gallop | 1978 | |
| Japan | Gekkou | 2017 | |
| Japan | GEMBA | 2006 | |
| Japan | Genco | 1997 | |
| Japan | Geno Studio | 2015 | |
| Japan | GoHands | 2008 | |
| Japan | Gonzo | 1992 | |
| Japan | Graphinica | 2009 | |
| Japan | Hoods Entertainment | 2009 | |
| Japan | Imagin | 1992 | |
| Japan | J.C.Staff | 1987 | |
| Japan | Jumondou | 2009 | |
| Japan | Khara | 2006 | |
| Japan | Kinema Citrus | 2008 | |
| Japan | Konami Animation | 2023 | |
| Japan | Kyoto Animation | 1981 | |
| Japan | LandQ Studios | 2009 | |
| Japan | Lapin Track | 2014 | |
| Japan | Larx Entertainment | 2006 | |
| Japan | Lay-duce | 2013 | |
| Japan | Lerche | 2011 | |
| Japan | Lesprit | 2016 | |
| Japan | Liber | 2019 | |
| Japan | Liden Films | 2012 | |
| Japan | Madhouse | 1972 | |
| Japan | Magic Bus | 1977 | |
| Japan | Maho Film | 2018 | |
| Japan | MAPPA | 2011 | |
| Japan | Marvelous | 1997 | |
| Japan | Marza Animation Planet | 2005 | |
| Japan | Millepensee | 2013 | |
| Japan | Mook Animation | 1986 | |
| Japan | Movic | 1983 | |
| Japan | Naz | 2013 | |
| Japan | Nexus | 2012 | |
| Japan | Nintendo Pictures | 2011 | |
| Japan | Nippon Animation | 1962 | |
| Japan | Nomad | 2003 | |
| Japan | NUT | 2017 | |
| Japan | Oh! Production | 1970 | |
| Japan | Okuruto Noboru | 2017 | |
| Japan | OLM | 1994 | |
| Japan | Orange | 2004 | |
| Japan | P.A. Works | 2000 | |
| Japan | Passione | 2013 | |
| Japan | Pine Jam | 2015 | |
| Japan | Platinum Vision | 2016 | |
| Japan | Polygon Pictures | 1983 | |
| Japan | Production I.G | 1987 | |
| Japan | Project No.9 | 2009 | |
| Japan | Quad | 2018 | |
| Japan | Revoroot | 2016 | |
| Japan | Robot Communications | 1986 | |
| Japan | Sanzigen | 2006 | |
| Japan | Satelight | 1995 | |
| Japan | Science Saru | 2013 | |
| Japan | Seven | 2007 | |
| Japan | Seven Arcs | 2002 | |
| Japan | Shirogumi | 1974 | |
| Japan | Shuka | 2013 | |
| Japan | Shaft | 1975 | |
| Japan | Shin-Ei Animation | 1976 | |
| Japan | Silver Link | 2007 | |
| Japan | Sola Digital Arts | 2009 | |
| Japan | Square Enix Image Studio Division | 1999 | |
| Japan | Staple Entertainment | 2020 | |
| Japan | Studio 4°C | 1986 | |
| Japan | Studio A-Cat | 1996 | |
| Japan | Studio Bind | 2018 | |
| Japan | Studio Blanc | 2008 | |
| Japan | Studio Chizu | 2011 | |
| Japan | Studio Colorido | 2011 | |
| Japan | Studio Comet | 1986 | |
| Japan | Studio Deen | 1975 | |
| Japan | Studio Elle | 1961 | |
| Japan | Studio Ghibli | 1984 | |
| Japan | Studio Gokumi | 2010 | |
| Japan | Studio Hibari | 1979 | |
| Japan | Studio Kai | 2019 | |
| Japan | Studio Lings | 2014 | |
| Japan | Studio Mother | 2019 | |
| Japan | Studio Nue | 1972 | |
| Japan | Studio Palette | 2018 | |
| Japan | Studio Pierrot | 1979 | |
| Japan | Studio Ponoc | 2015 | |
| Japan | Studio Puyukai | 2007 | |
| Japan | Studio Signpost | 1959 | |
| Japan | Studio VOLN | 2014 | |
| Japan | Sunrise | 1972 | |
| Japan | SynergySP | 1998 | |
| Japan | Tatsunoko Productions | 1962 | |
| Japan | Telecom Animation Film | 1975 | |
| Japan | Tezuka Productions | 1968 | |
| Japan | TMS Entertainment | 1946 | |
| Japan | TNK | 1999 | |
| Japan | Toei Animation | 1948 | |
| Japan | Toho Animation Studio | 2017 | |
| Japan | Trigger | 2011 | |
| Japan | Troyca | 2013 | |
| Japan | Tsumugi Akita Animation Lab | 2017 | |
| Japan | Typhoon Graphics | 2014 | |
| Japan | TYO Animations | 2009 | |
| Japan | Ufotable | 2000 | |
| Japan | Voil | 2022 | |
| Japan | White Fox | 2007 | |
| Japan | Wit Studio | 2012 | |
| Japan | Wolfsbane | 2017 | |
| Japan | Yokohama Animation Laboratory | 2015 | |
| Japan | Yostar Pictures | 2020 | |
| Japan | Zero-G | 2011 | |
| Japan | Zexcs | 1998 | |
| Japan | Zuiyo | 1988 | |
| Jordan | Kharabeesh | 2008 | |
| Jordan | Rubicon Group Holding | 2004 | |
| Latvia | Dream Well Studio | 2019 | |
| Malaysia | Animonsta Studios | 2009 | |
| Malaysia | WAU Animation | 2013 | |
| Malaysia | Les' Copaque Production | 2005 | |
| Mexico | Animex Producciones | 2000 | |
| Mexico | Ánima Estudios | 2002 | |
| Mexico | Huevocartoon | 2001 | |
| Mexico | Estudio Haini | 2003 | |
| Mexico | Mighty Animation | 2012 | |
| New Zealand | Pūkeko Pictures | 2008 | |
| New Zealand | Wētā FX | 1993 | |
| North Korea | SEK Studio | 1957 | |
| Philippines | Toon City | 1993 | |
| Philippines | Snipple Animation | 2011 | |
| Poland | SPInka Film Studio | 2004 | |
| Romania | Animafilm | 1964 | |
| Russia | Animaccord Animation Studio | 2008 | |
| Russia | InlayFilm | 2007 | |
| Russia | Melnitsa Animation Studio | 1999 | |
| Russia | Petersburg Animation Studio | 2003 | |
| Russia | Soyuzmultfilm | 1936 | |
| Russia | Wizart Animation | 2007 | |
| Saudi Arabia | Manga Productions | 2017 | |
| Saudi Arabia | Myrkott Animation Studio | 2014 | |
| Singapore | Infinite Frameworks | 1997 | |
| Singapore | Sparky Animation | 2006 | |
| Singapore | Tiny Island Productions | 2002 | |
| South Africa | Sunrise Productions | 2003 | |
| South Africa | Triggerfish Animation Studios | 1996 | |
| South Africa | Xyzoo Animation | 1991 | |
| South Korea | AKOM | 1985 | |
| South Korea | Digital eMation | 1993 | |
| South Korea | Dong Woo Animation | 1991 | |
| South Korea | DR Movie | 1990 | |
| South Korea | G&G Entertainment | 2000 | |
| South Korea | Hanho Heung-Up | 1984 | |
| South Korea | Koko Enterprises | 1990 | |
| South Korea | Saerom Animation | 1987 | |
| South Korea | Studio Mir | 2010 | |
| South Korea | Sunmin Image Pictures | 1990 | |
| South Korea | Sunwoo Entertainment | 1974 | |
| Spain | Skydance Animation Madrid | 2002 | Formerly known as Ilion Animation Studios |
| Spain | Zinkia Entertainment | 2001 | |
| Taiwan | Brilliant Animation Studios | 1978 | Also known as Wang Film Productions, Hong Guang Animation and Cuckoos' Nest Studio |
| Taiwan | Hong Ying Animation | 1986 | |
| United Arab Emirates | Fanar Production | 2008 | |
United Kingdom
| United Kingdom | Aardman Animations | 1972 | |
| United Kingdom | Astley Baker Davies | 1994 | |
| United Kingdom | Bird Studios | 2003 | |
| United Kingdom | Blacknorth | 2009 | |
| United Kingdom | Blue-Zoo | 2000 | |
| United Kingdom | Blink Industries | 2012 | |
| United Kingdom | Cake Entertainment | 2002 | |
| United Kingdom | Collingwood & Co. | 1988 | |
| United Kingdom | DNEG Animation | 2014 | |
| United Kingdom | Flickerpix | 2003 | |
| United Kingdom | Hanna-Barbera Studios Europe | 2007 | Formerly known as Cartoon Network Studios Europe |
| United Kingdom | Illuminated Film Company | 1993 | |
| United Kingdom | King Rollo Films | 1978 | |
| United Kingdom | Littlenobody | 2004 | |
| United Kingdom | Locksmith Animation | 2014 | |
| United Kingdom | LTL Production | 2009 | |
| United Kingdom | Magic Light Pictures | 2003 | |
| United Kingdom | Moonbug Entertainment | 2018 | |
| United Kingdom | Ragdoll Productions | 1984 | |
| United Kingdom | Red Kite Animation | 1997 | |
| United Kingdom | Renga Media | 1995 | |
| United Kingdom | Smallfilms | 1959 | |
| United Kingdom | Spite Your Face Productions | 1999 | |
| United Kingdom | Straandlooper | 2008 | |
| United Kingdom | Studio AKA | 1989 | |
| United Kingdom | Studio Liddell | 1996 | |
| United Kingdom | The Line | 2013 | |
| United Kingdom | WildBrain Spark Studios | 2016 | Formerly WildBrain Studios. Division of WildBrain Spark |
| United States | 20th Century Animation | 1994 | Subsidiary of The Walt Disney Company |
| United States | 20th Television Animation | 1999 | Subsidiary of The Walt Disney Company |
| United States | 41 Entertainment | 2010 | |
| United States | 6 Point Harness | 2003 | |
| United States | A Squared Entertainment | 2009 | |
| United States | Alcon Entertainment | 1997 | |
| United States | Annapurna Animation | 2022 | |
| United States | Animusic | 1995 | |
| United States | Augenblick Studios | 1999 | |
| United States | Avatar Studios | 2021 | A division of Nickelodeon centered on developing animated series and movies based on Avatar: The Last Airbender franchise. |
| United States | Awesome Inc | 2005 | |
| United States | Bagdasarian Productions | 1961 | |
| United States | Bandera Entertainment | 2019 | |
| United States | Bent Image Lab | 2002 | |
| United States | Big Shot Pictures | 2026 | |
| United States | BuzzFeed Animation Lab | 2017 | |
| United States | Bento Box Entertainment | 2009 | |
| United States | Blur Studio | 1995 | |
| United States | Buzzco Associates | 1974 | Founded as Perpetual Motion Pictures in 1968 renamed Buzzco by Buzz Potamkin in 1982 |
| United States | Cartoon Network Studios | 1994 | Started as sub-division of Hanna-Barbera; Subsidiary of Skydance |
| United States | CBS Eye Animation Productions | 2018 | A division a CBS Studios |
| United States | Cartuna | 2015 | |
| United States | Charlex | 1979 | |
| United States | Chalkdust Animation Studios | 2022 | |
| United States | Cinécraft Productions | 1939 | |
| United States | Creative Capers Entertainment | 1989 | |
| United States | The Curiosity Company | 1999 | Formerly known as The ULULU Company |
| United States | Digital Domain | 1993 | Purchased by Galloping Horse Studio in China |
| United States | DreamWorks Animation | 1994 | Subsidiary of Comcast |
| United States | DreamWorks Animation Television | 2013 | Formerly known as DreamWorks Television Animation |
| United States | Exceptional Minds | 2011 | |
| United States | Filmcow | 2005 | |
| United States | FredFilms | 2021 | |
| United States | Floyd County Productions | 2009 | |
| United States | Frederator Studios | 1997 | |
| United States | Fred Wolf Films | 1967 | |
| United States | Fantasy Project | 2026 | |
| United States | Fuzzy Door Productions | 1996 | |
| United States | Illumination | 2007 | Subsidiary of Comcast |
| United States | Iron Circus Animation | 2023 | |
| United States | Industrial Light & Magic | 1975 | Subsidiary of The Walt Disney Company |
| United States | icebox Animation | 1999 | |
| United States | JibJab | 1999 | |
| United States | Jellybox | 2023 | |
| United States | Justin Roiland's Solo Vanity Card Productions! | 2013 | |
| United States | Klasky Csupo | 1982 | |
| United States | Kurtz & Friends | 1981 | |
| United States | LAIKA | 2005 | |
| United States | Lee Mendelson Film Productions | 1960 | |
| United States | Lion Forge Animation | 2019 | |
| United States | Lex+Otis | 2018 | |
| United States | Lucasfilm Animation | 2003 | Subsidiary of The Walt Disney Company; Lucasfilm Animation Singapore closed in 2023 |
| United States | Luv Letter Studios | 2023 | |
| United States | Marvel Animation | 2008 | Subsidiary of The Walt Disney Company |
| United States | Marvel Studios Animation | 2021 | Division of Marvel Studios. |
| United States | Mondo Media | 1988 | |
| United States | MTV Animation | 1986 | Subsidiary of Paramount Global |
| United States | Netflix Animation Studios | 2018 | |
| United States | Nexus Studios | 2000 | Also based in United Kingdom |
| United States | Nickelodeon Animation Studio | 1990 | Subsidiary of Paramount Global; formerly known as Games Animation. |
| United States | Nickelodeon Digital | 1994 | |
| United States | Paramount Animation | 2011 | Subsidiary of Paramount Global; Paramount's return to having its own animated division for the first time since 1967. |
| United States | Passion Pictures | 1987 | Also based in United Kingdom |
| United States | Paws, Inc. | 1981 | |
| United States | Piranha NYC | 2009 | |
| United States | Pixar Animation Studios | 1986 | Subsidiary of The Walt Disney Company; made the first computer-animated feature film, Toy Story |
| United States | Plymptoons Studios | 1985 | Formerly known as Bill Plympton Studios |
| United States | Powerhouse Animation Studios, Inc. | 2001 | |
| United States | Premavision/Clokey Productions | 1955 | |
| United States | Psyop | 2000 | |
| United States | Reel FX Creative Studios | 1993 | |
| United States | Renegade Animation | 1992 | |
| United States | Rough Draft Studios | 1991 | Also based in South Korea |
| United States | Savage Studios Ltd. | 1992 | |
| United States | Screen Novelties | 2000 | |
| United States | Skybound Animation | 2021 | |
| United States | Shademaker Productions | 2010 | |
| United States | ShadowMachine | 1999 | |
| United States | Skydance Animation | 2017 | |
| United States | Sony Pictures Animation | 2002 | Subsidiary of Sony |
| United States | Sony Pictures Imageworks | 1992 | Subsidiary of Sony; visual effects & animation studio. |
| United States | South Park Studios | 1997 | Formerly known as Braniff Productions, Parker-Stone Productions |
| United States | SpindleHorse Toons | 2018 | |
| United States | Splash Entertainment | 1992 | Formerly Mike Young Productions (UK), and MoonScoop US. |
| United States | Sycamore Studios | 2024 | |
| United States | Stoopid Buddy Stoodios | 1999 | |
| United States | Stretch Films | 1991 | |
| United States | Tau Films | 2014 | |
| United States | The Animation Picture Company | 2006 | |
| United States | Titmouse | 1999 | |
| United States | Universal Animation Studios | 1991 | Formerly known as Universal Cartoon Studios; Subsidiary of Comcast |
| United States | Vanguard Animation | 2002 | |
| United States | Walt Disney Animation Studios | 1923 | Subsidiary of The Walt Disney Company |
| United States | Walt Disney Television Animation | 1985 | Subsidiary of The Walt Disney Company |
| United States | Warner Bros. Animation | 1980 | Subsidiary of Skydance |
| United States | Warner Bros. Pictures Animation | 2013 | Subsidiary of Skydance, formerly known as Warner Animation Group (WAG) |
| United States | Weston Woods Studios | 1953 | |
| United States | Williams Street Studios | 1994 | Formerly Ghost Planet Industries; Subsidiary of Skydance |
| United States | Worker Studio | 2009 | |

== Defunct studios ==
| Country | Studio | Active | Notes and sources |
|---|---|---|---|
| Argentina | Illusion Studios | 2001–2013 | |
| Australia | Animal Logic | 1991–2024 | Merged into Netflix Animation Studios. |
| Australia | Burbank Animation Studios | 1981–2008 | |
| Australia | DisneyToon Studios Australia | 1988–2006 | Also known as Walt Disney Animation Australia. |
| Australia | Energee Entertainment | 1989–2002 | |
| Australia | Mr. Big Cartoons | 1987–1997 | |
| Bangladesh | ToonBangla | 2005–2014 | |
| Belgium | Belvision | 1956–2005 | |
| Canada | Cinar Corporation | 1976–2004 | Reincorporated as Cookie Jar Entertainment. |
| Canada | Cookie Jar Group | 1976–2014 | Formerly Cinar, based in Toronto, Ontario, Canada. |
| Canada | Decode Entertainment | 1997–2010s | Merged with Halifax Film. Later renamed to DHX Media Toronto before closure of animation division. |
| Canada | DHX Media Halifax | 2010–2018 | |
| Canada | Fatkat | 1999–2009 | |
| Canada | Halifax Film | 2006–2010 | |
| Canada | Halifax Film Company | 2004–2006 | |
| Canada | International Rocketship Limited | 1975–2000 | |
| Canada | Lacewood | 1988–1998 | |
| Canada | March Entertainment | 1996–early 2010s | |
| Canada | Nerd Corps Entertainment | 2002–2016 | Purchased by DHX Media in 2014, folded into DHX Studios Vancouver in 2016. |
| Canada | ON Animation Studios | 2011–2025 | |
| Canada | Pixar Canada | 2010–2013 | Defunct subdivision of The Walt Disney Company. |
| Canada | Studio B Productions | 1988–2016 | Purchased by DHX Media in 2007, renamed to DHX Media Vancouver in 2010, folded into DHX Studios Vancouver in 2016. |
| Canada | ToonBox Entertainment | 2008–2019 | |
| Canada | TVC Cartoons | 1961–1979 / 1988–1997 | Also based in the United Kingdom. |
| Canada | Walt Disney Animation Canada | 1996–2000 | Defunct subdivision of Walt Disney Television Animation. |
| Chile | Cine Animadores | 1989 | |
| Czechoslovakia | Bratři v triku | 1945–2012 | |
| Czechoslovakia | Rembrandt Films | 1949–1970 | |
| Czechoslovakia | Slovak Film Production – Animated Film Studio | 1965–1991 | |
| Denmark | Copenhagen Bombay | 2006–2023 | |
| France | Action Synthese | 1998–2013 | |
| France | Cyber Group Studios | 2003–2025 | |
| France | DIC Audiovisuel | 1971–1987 | French offices re-incorporated into Créativité & Développement. |
| France | Marathon Media Group | 1990–2016 | Folded after Zodiak Media merged with Banijay Group. |
| France | MoonScoop Group | 2003–2014 | Assets now owned by Dargaud. |
| France | SIP Animation | 1977–2009 | Filed for liquidation and closed in 2009. |
| France | Walt Disney Animation France | 1986–2003 | Founded as Brizzi Films, Defunct subdivision of Walt Disney Television Animation. |
| Germany | BKN International | 1999–2009 | Filed for insolvency in 2009. |
| Germany | Deutsche Zeichentrickfilme GmbH | 1941–1944 | |
| Germany | Dingo Pictures | 1993–2021 | Founded as Media Concept; research team took over in 2021. |
| Germany | TV-Loonland AG | 1989–2009 | Shared with UK/Spain. |
| Hong Kong | Imagi Animation Studios | 2000–2010 | |
| Hungary | Pannónia Film Studio | 1951–2015 | |
| Hungary | Varga Studio | 1988–2005 | |
| India | Crest Animation Studios | 1990–2013 | |
| Ireland | Fred Wolf Films Dublin | 1989–2000 | |
| Japan | 3Hz | 2013–2024 | |
| Japan | A.P.P.P. | 1984–2021 | |
| Japan | Arms Corporation | 1996–2020 | |
| Japan | Artland | 1978–2010 | |
| Japan | Artmic | 1978–1997 | |
| Japan | Animation Studio Artland | 2010–2017 | |
| Japan | Cloud Hearts | 2021–2024 | |
| Japan | Daume | 1986–2016 | |
| Japan | Ekachi Epilka | 2017–2025 | |
| Japan | Gainax | 1984–2025 | |
| Japan | Geek Toys | 2017–2023 | Merged with its parent company, Geek Pictures. |
| Japan | Group TAC | 1968–2010 | |
| Japan | Hal Film Maker | 1993–2009 | Merged into TYO Animations. |
| Japan | Knack Productions | 1967–2008 | |
| Japan | Manglobe | 2002–2015 | |
| Japan | Mushi Production | 1961–1973 | New studio with same name active since 1977. |
| Japan | Ordet | 2007–2025 | |
| Japan | Radix Ace Entertainment | 1995–2006 | |
| Japan | Remic | 2005–2015 | |
| Japan | Spectrum Animation | 1988–1998 | |
| Japan | Studio Fantasia | 1983–2016 | |
| Japan | Topcraft | 1971–1985 | Became Studio Ghibli. |
| Japan | Walt Disney Animation Japan | 1984–2004 | Founded as Pacific Animation. |
| Japan | Xebec | 1995–2019 | Absorbed into Sunrise. |
| Mexico | Gamma Productions | 1957–1967 | |
| New Zealand | Huhu Studios | 1996–2022 | |
| Poland | Se-ma-for | 1947–2018 | |
| Russia | Pilot Studio | 1988–? | |
| Russia | Studio Ekran | 1968–1994 | |
| Saudi Arabia | Lumink | 2011–2014 | |
| Singapore | Lucasfilm Animation Singapore | 2003–2023 | |
| South Africa | Clockwork Zoo Animation | 2005–2010 | |
| Spain | BRB International | 1972–2022 | |
| Spain | Dygra Films | 1987–2012 | |
| Spain | Kandor Graphics | 1992–2014 | |
| Switzerland | The Pygos Group | 1979–2001 | Formerly Trickfilmstudio and Pingu Filmstudio. |
| USSR | Kyivnaukfilm | 1941–1998 | |
| United Kingdom | Amblimation | 1989–1997 | The animation production arm of Steven Spielberg's Amblin Entertainment. Folded into DreamWorks Animation. |
| United Kingdom | Bird Studios | 2003–? | |
| United Kingdom | bolexbrothers | 1991–2008 | |
| United Kingdom | Cosgrove Hall Films | 1976–2009 | ITV owners wound down after purchase. |
| United Kingdom | Gaumont British Animation | 1946–1950 | |
| United Kingdom | Halas and Batchelor | 1940–1986 | |
| United Kingdom | HOT Animation | 1997–2012 | |
| United Kingdom | Jellyfish Pictures | 2001–2025 | |
| United Kingdom | Richard Williams Studio Ltd. | 1958–1992 | |
| United Kingdom | BKN New Media | 2000–2009 | Shared with Spain; subsidiary of BKN International. |
| United Kingdom | Smallfilms | 1954–1988 | |
| United Kingdom | Walt Disney Animation U.K. | 1986–1991 | |
| United States | 70/30 Productions | 2000–2009 | |
| United States | Adelaide Productions | 1993–2021 | Formerly named Columbia TriStar Children's Television. Currently dormant. |
| United States | Adventure Cartoon Productions | 1962–1966 | |
| United States | Allspark Animation | 2014–2020 | Defunct division of Hasbro; folded into Entertainment One. |
| United States | Animation Collective | 2003–2014 | |
| United States | Animax Entertainment | 2001–2016 | |
| United States | Bakshi Productions | 1972 | Also known as Ralph's Spot. |
| United States | Barré Studio | 1914–1923 | After 1917 called Bud Fisher Films Corporation. |
| United States | Big Idea Entertainment | 1989–2022 | Formerly GRAFx Studios; remains as an in-name-only unit of DreamWorks Animation. |
| United States | Bill Melendez Productions | 1962–2006 | |
| United States | Blue Sky Studios | 1987–2021 | Defunct subsidiary of Disney; folded into 20th Century Animation. |
| United States | Bohbot Entertainment | 1985–2001 | Also known as BKN; merged with its International division in 2001. |
| United States | Bray Productions | 1913–1927 | |
| United States | Cartoon Pizza | 2001–2015 | Currently dormant. |
| United States | Chuck Jones Productions | 1971–1995 | |
| United States | Churchill Films | 1964–1996 | |
| United States | Circle 7 Animation | 2004–2006 | Defunct subdivision of Walt Disney Company. |
| United States | Colossal Pictures | 1976–1999 | |
| United States | Cosmic Toast Studios | 2007–2016 | |
| United States | Curious Pictures | 1978–2014 | Formerly Stowmar Enterprises and Broadcast Arts. |
| United States | DePatie-Freleng Enterprises | 1963–1981 | Re-organized as Marvel Productions. |
| United States | DIC Entertainment | 1982–2008 | Founded as DIC Enterprises; folded by Cookie Jar Entertainment. |
| United States | DisneyToon Studios | 1990–2018 | Defunct subdivision of Walt Disney Company. |
| United States | DNA Productions | 1987–2006 | Became Reel FX Animation Studios. |
| United States | DreamWorks Television Animation | 1996–1999 | Became DreamWorks Animation Television |
| United States | DUCK Studios | 1972–2015 | Folded into Noble Animation. |
| United States | Filmation | 1963–1989 | Assets owned by DreamWorks Animation through DreamWorks Classics. |
| United States | Film Roman | 1984–2018 | |
| United States | Fleischer Studios | 1921–1967 | Also Inkwell Studios/Famous Studios/Paramount Cartoon Studios. Name changed in 1928, 1942, 1956. |
| United States | Format Films | 1959 | |
| United States | Fox Animation Studios | 1994–2000 | See also: 20th Century Fox Animation. |
| United States | Games Animation | 1990 | |
| United States | George Pal Studio | 1940–1948 | Stop-motion animation only. |
| United States | Golden Films | 1990–2004 | |
| United States | Grantray-Lawrence Animation | 1954–1967 | |
| United States | H-Gun | 1988–2001 | |
| United States | Hanna-Barbera | 1957–2001 | Folded into Cartoon Network Studios; defunct subdivision of AT&T. |
| United States | Harman-Ising Productions | 1930–1960 | |
| United States | ImageMovers Digital | 2009–2011 | Joint-venture with Disney; folded after Mars Needs Moms box office failure. |
| United States | International Film Service | 1915–1918 | |
| United States | Jack Kinney Productions | 1960–1963 | |
| United States | Jay Ward Productions | 1958–1984 | |
| United States | John Lemmon Films | 1984–2018 | |
| United States | Larry Harmon Pictures | 1958–1962 | |
| United States | Jetix Animation Concepts | 2004–2009 | Label of Walt Disney Television Animation. |
| United States | Jetlag Productions | 1992–1996 | |
| United States | Korty Films | 1964–2012 | |
| United States | Jumbo Pictures | 1988–2000 | Folded into Walt Disney Television Animation. |
| United States | Kroyer Films | 1986–2022 | Studio inactive since 1994; unit dissolved in 2022. |
| United States | Laugh-O-Gram Studio | 1921–1923 | Walt Disney's first animation venture. |
| United States | Leon Schlesinger Productions | 1933–1969 | Sold to Warner Bros in 1944. Reopened 1967–1969. |
| United States | Little Airplane Productions | 1999–2023 | |
| United States | Marvel Productions | 1981–1993 | Successor to DePatie-Freleng Enterprises. |
| United States | Mathematical Applications Group, Inc. | 1966–1985 | Also known as MAPI. |
| United States | MGM Cartoons | 1937–1957 | |
| United States | MGM Animation | 1993–2002 | |
| United States | MGM Animation/Visual Arts | 1962–1970 | Also Sib Tower 12 Productions. |
| United States | Mirari Films | 1999–2022 | |
| United States | O Entertainment | 1990–2013 | |
| United States | Omation Animation Studio | 2002–2013 | |
| United States | Noyes & Laybourne | 1978–1991 | Folded into Colossal Pictures. |
| United States | Pacific Data Images | 1980–2015 | Closed by DreamWorks Animation. |
| United States | Perpetual Motion Pictures | 1968–1982 | Renamed Buzzco Associates by Buzz Potamkin in 1982. |
| United States | Phoenix Animation Studios | 1987–1998 | |
| United States | PorchLight Entertainment | 1995–2011 | Defunct subdivision of PorchLight Worldwide, Inc. |
| United States | Radicial Axis | 2000–2021 | |
| United States | Rankin/Bass Animated Entertainment | 1960–1987 | Founded as VideoCraft International; folded by Telepictures Corporation. |
| United States | Rhythm and Hues Studios | 1987–2013 | |
| United States | Rooster Teeth Animation | 2014–2024 | Defunct subsidiary of Warner Bros. Discovery; closed May 2024. |
| United States | Ruby-Spears Productions | 1977–1996 | Studio inactive as of 1996. |
| United States | Skellington Productions | 1986–1998 | Renamed as Skellington in 1992. |
| United States | Soup2Nuts | 1993–2015 | Formerly named Tom Snyder Productions. |
| United States | Spümcø | 1989–2005 | Became Spümtwo. |
| United States | Sunbow Entertainment | 1980–2004 | Folded into TV-Loonland AG in 2004. |
| United States | Terrytoons | 1928–1968 | |
| United States | Total Television | 1960–1968 | |
| United States | Tradition Studios | 2009–2012 | Absorbed into Digital Domain. |
| United States | Turner Feature Animation | 1991–1996 | Folded into Warner Bros. Feature Animation. |
| United States | Ub Iwerks Studio | 1930–1936 | Continued producing commercials until the mid-1940s. |
| United States | United Productions of America | 1943–2000 | Also known as UPA. |
| United States | Van Beuren Studios | 1928–1936 | |
| United States | Walt Disney Feature Animation Florida | 1989–2004 | Satellite studio of Walt Disney Animation Studios. |
| United States | Walter Lantz Productions | 1929–1948 / 1950–1972 | Universal now owns the library. |
| United States | Warner Bros. Cartoons | 1932–1963 | |
| United States | Warner Bros. Feature Animation | 1994–2004 | Folded into Warner Bros. Animation. |
| United States | Warner Bros.-Seven Arts Animation | 1966–1969 | |
| United States | WildBrain Entertainment | 1994–2015 | Folded into DHX's other operations. |
| United States | Will Vinton Studios | 1979–2005 | Became LAIKA. |
| United States | Winkler Pictures/Charles Mintz Studios | 1921–1946 | Re-organized as Screen Gems Studio in 1940. |
| United States | Zodiac Entertainment | 1989–1994 | |
United States; Israel
| United States; Israel | Animation Lab | 2006–2013 | |
| United States; Israel | Saban Entertainment | 1984–2001 | Sold to the Walt Disney Company in 2001. |
| United States; Ireland | Sullivan-Bluth Studios | 1979–1995 | |
| United States; India | Crest Animation Productions | 1986–2013 | |
| United States; Japan | Crunchyroll Studios | 2018–2021 | |
United States; United Kingdom
| United States; United Kingdom | HIT Entertainment | 1982–2016 | |
| United States; United Kingdom | FilmFair | 1968–1996 | |
| United States; United Kingdom | Fine Arts Films | 1955–1996 | |

== See also ==
- List of animation studios owned by NBCUniversal
- List of animation studios owned by Paramount Skydance
- List of animation studios owned by the Walt Disney Company
- List of animation studios owned by Warner Bros. Discovery
- List of animation studios owned by Sony
- List of Japanese animation studios
- List of animation distribution companies
- Film genre
- Motion graphic design
