= 25th Tokyo International Film Festival =

2012 Japanese film festival

- Opening film: Cirque du Soleil: Worlds Away
- Closing film: Trouble with the Curve
- Location: Tokyo, Japan
- Founded: 1985
- Awards received: The Other Son
- Awards: Tokyo Sakura Grand Prix
- Hosted by: UNIJAPAN
- Festival date: October 20, 2012 – October 28, 2012
- Website: 2012.tiff-jp.net/en/

The 25th annual Tokyo International Film Festival (TIFF) was held from October 20 to October 28, 2012.

== Official selection ==
=== Competition ===
English title	Original title	Director(s)	Production country/countries
Accession	—N/a	Michael J. Rix	South Africa
Araf - Somewhere in Between	—N/a	Yeşim Ustaoğlu	Turkey; Germany
Atambua 39 Celsius	—N/a	Riri Riza	Indonesia
The Black Square	黒い四角	Hiroshi Okuhara	Japan
Feng Shui	万箭穿心	Wang Jing	China
Flashback Memories 3D	フラッシュバックメモリーズ 3D	Tetsuaki Matsue	Japan
Hannah Arendt	Hannah Arendt	Margarethe von Trotta	Germany
A Hijacking	Kapringen	Tobias Lindholm	Denmark
Juvenile Offender	범죄소년	Kang Yi-kwan	South Korea
Nina	Nina	Elisa Fuksas	Italy
No	NO	Pablo Larraín	Chile; United States
The Other Son	Le fils de l'Autre	Lorraine Lévy	France
Ship of Theseus	—N/a	Anand Gandhi	India
What Maisie Knew	—N/a	Scott McGehee; David Siegel	United States
Yellow	—N/a	Nick Cassavetes	United States

=== Special screenings ===
English title	Original title	Director(s)	Production country/countries
Cirque du Soleil: Worlds Away	—N/a	Andrew Adamson	United States
Trouble with the Curve	—N/a	Robert Lorenz	United States
Japan in a Day	ジャパン イン ア デイ	Philip Martin; Gaku Narita	Japan; United Kingdom
Skyfall Special Presentation: James Bond 50th Anniversary†	—N/a	Sam Mendes	United Kingdom; United States
Everything or Nothing: The Untold Story of 007	—N/a	Stevan Riley	United Kingdom
Aokigahara	青木ヶ原	Taku Shinjo	Japan
Argo	—N/a	Ben Affleck	United States
The Woman in Black	—N/a	James Watkins	United Kingdom; Canada; Sweden
Crow's Thumb	カラスの親指 by rule of CROW's thumb	Tadafumi Ito	Japan
Garo and the Wailing Dragon (tentative)	牙狼〈GARO〉〜蒼哭ノ魔竜〜	Keita Amemiya	Japan
G'mor evian!	グッモーエビアン!	Toru Yamamoto	Japan
KON-SHIN	渾身 KON-SHIN	Yoshinari Nishikori	Japan
Salmon Fishing in the Yemen	—N/a	Lasse Hallström	United Kingdom
Sue, Mai & Sawa: Righting the Girl Ship	すーちゃん まいちゃん さわ子さん	Osamu Minorikawa	Japan
My Departure	旅の贈りもの 明日へ	Tetsu Maeda	Japan
A Terminal Trust	終の信託	Masayuki Suo	Japan
Tug of War!	綱引いちゃった!	Nobuo Mizuta	Japan
The Floating Castle	のぼうの城	Isshin Inudo; Shinji Higuchi	Japan
Farewell, My Queen	Les Adieux à la Reine	Benoît Jacquot	France; Spain
The Best Exotic Marigold Hotel	—N/a	John Madden	United Kingdom; United States; United Arab Emirates
A Story of Yonosuke	横道世之介	Shuichi Okita	Japan
Red Lights	—N/a	Rodrigo Cortés	United States; Spain

†: 12 minutes

=== Winds of Asia-Middle East ===
†: Nominated for "Best Asian-Middle Eastern Film Award"

==== Film Panorama of Asia-Middle East ====
English title	Original title	Director(s)	Production country/countries
Perfect Game†	퍼펙트게임	Park Hee-gon	South Korea
Doomsday Book	인류멸망보고서	Kim Jee-woon; Yim Pil-sung	South Korea
Sleepless Night†	잠못드는밤	Jang Kun-jae	South Korea
Full Circle†	飞越老人院	Zhang Yang	China
Don't Expect Praises†	有人赞美聪慧，有人则不	Yang Jin	China; South Korea
Love in the Buff†	春嬌與志明	Pang Ho-cheung	Hong Kong; China
Floating City††	浮城	Yim Ho	Hong Kong
The Soul of Bread†	愛的麺包魂	Kao Pin-chuan; Lin Chun-yang	Taiwan
Touch of the Light†	逆光飛翔	Chang Jung-chi	Taiwan; Hong Kong; China
Sweetheart Chocolate	甜心巧克力 スイートハート・チョコレート	Tetsuo Shinohara	China; Japan
I Carried You Home	Padang Besar	Tongpong Chantarangkul	Thailand
Bwakaw†	—N/a	Jun Robles Lana	Philippines
Agneepath†	—N/a	Karan Malhotra	India
Him, Here After†	Ini Avan	Asoka Handagama	Sri Lanka
Lifeline†	Galoogah	Mohammad Ebrahim Moayyeri	Iran
Night of Silence†	Lal Gece	Reis Çelik	Turkey
Student†	Студент	Darezhan Omirbaev	Kazakhstan

††: Floating City was cancelled.

==== Indonesian Express: Nugroho, Edwin and Riza ====
English title	Original title	Director(s)	Production country/countries
Soegija†	—N/a	Garin Nugroho	Indonesia
The Blindfold	Mata Tertutup	Garin Nugroho	Indonesia
Postcards from the Zoo†	Kebun Binatang	Edwin	Indonesia; Germany; Hong Kong
Blind Pig Who Wants to Fly	Babi Buta Yang Ingin Terbang	Edwin	Indonesia
The Rainbow Troops	Laskar Pelangi	Riri Riza	Indonesia
SANThe Dreamer	Sang Pemimpi	Riri Riza	Indonesia

==== Discovering Asian Cinema: Golden Slumbers of the Cambodian film history ====
English title	Original title	Director(s)	Production country/countries
Golden Slumbers	Le Sommeil d'or	Davy Chou	France; Cambodia
Peov Chouk Sor	—N/a	Tea Lim Koun	Cambodia
The Snake Man	ពស់កេងកង Puos Keng Kang	Tea Lim Koun	Cambodia

=== Japanese Eyes ===
English title	Original title	Director(s)	Production country
Where Does Love Go? Tentatively Titled	愛のゆくえ（仮）	Bunyo Kimura	Japan
Akaboshi	あかぼし	Ryohei Yoshino	Japan
Chasing Santa Claus	サンタクロースをつかまえて	Hiroki Iwabuchi	Japan
GFP Bunny	GFP BUNNY─タリウム少女のプログラム─	Yutaka Tsuchiya	Japan
Last Days of Summer	少女と夏の終わり	Tomomi Ishiyama	Japan
Our Night is Not Long	NOT LONG, AT NIGHT 夜はながくない	Shoji Toyama	Japan
Kuro	Hanabanareni (はなればなれに)	Daisuke Shimote	Japan
Since Then	あれから	Makoto Shinozaki	Japan
Something Wicked Comes Over the Wall	何かが壁を越えてくる	Norio Enomoto	Japan
The Town of Whales	くじらのまち	Keiko Tsuruoka	Japan
United Red Army†	実録・連合赤軍 あさま山荘への道程	Kōji Wakamatsu	Japan

†: Director Koji Wakamatsu Memorial Screening.

=== World Cinema ===
English title	Original title	Director(s)	Production country/countries
Dormant Beauty	Bella Addormentata	Marco Bellocchio	Italy; France
Here and There	Aquí y allá	Antonio Méndez Esparza	Spain; United States; Mexico
The Impossible	—N/a	J. A. Bayona	Spain; United States
Journal de France	Journal de France	Raymond Depardon; Claudine Nougaret	France
A Liar's Autobiography - The Untrue Story of Monty Python's Graham Chapman	—N/a	Bill Jones; Ben Timlett; Jeff Simpson	United Kingdom
Post Tenebras Lux	Post Tenebras Lux	Carlos Reygadas	Mexico; France; Germany; Netherlands
Reality	—N/a	Matteo Garrone	Italy; France
Side by Side - The Science, Art, and Impact of Digital Cinema	—N/a	Chris Kenneally	United States
Something in the Air	Après mai	Olivier Assayas	France
Spring Breakers	—N/a	Harmony Korine	United States
Strutter	—N/a	Kurt Voss; Allison Anders	United States
Thursday Till Sunday	De jueves a domingo	Dominga Sotomayor	Chile; Netherlands

=== Natural TIFF ===
English title	Original title	Director(s)	Production country/countries
Bestiaire	—N/a	Denis Côté	Canada; France
The Island President	—N/a	Jon Shenk	United States
Last Call at the Oasis	—N/a	Jessica Yu	United States
The Last Shepherd	L'Ultimo Pastore	Marco Bonfanti	Italy
No Business like Show Business	Die Wiesenberger - No Business like Show Business	Bernard Weber; Martin Schilt	Switzerland
Trashed	—N/a	Candida Brady	United Kingdom
Facing Animals	—N/a	Jan van Ijken	Netherlands
Himself He Cooks	—N/a	Valérie Berteau; Philippe Witjes	Belgium

=== Miscellaneous ===
==== Special Presentation ====
English title	Original title	Director(s)	Production country/countries
Raymond Chow Special All Night Screening
Police Story	警察故事	Jackie Chan	Hong Kong
Mr. Vampire	疆屍先生	Ricky Lau	Hong Kong
The Cannonball Run	—N/a	Hal Needham	United States
Special Midnight Screening for the President of Jury : Corman's Way
Von Richthofen and Brown	—N/a	Roger Corman	United States
Piranha	—N/a	Joe Dante	United States
Monster: Humanoids from the deep	—N/a	Barbara Peeters	United States

==== TIFF in Nihombashi ====
English title	Original title	Director(s)	Production country/countries
Bridge of Japan	Nihombashi (日本橋)	Kon Ichikawa	Japan
Judge and Thief	怪盗と判官	Bin Kato	Japan
Pathfinder of the Sky An Architect's Life/Story of Morin Kaku	空を拓く〜建築家・郭茂林という男〜	Atsuko Sakai	Japan
MIS -Human Secret Weapon-	二つの祖国で・日系陸軍情報部	Junichi Suzuki	Japan; United States
The Naked Island	裸の島	Kaneto Shindo	Japan
Death of a Japanese Salesman	Ending Note (エンディングノート)	Mami Sunada	Japan

==== Minato Screening ====
English title	Original title	Director(s)	Production country/countries
Minato Screening Program A
Julian †	—N/a	Matthew Moore	Australia
Komaneko -The First Step- †	—N/a	Tsuneo Gōda	Japan
Gus †	—N/a	Andrew Martin	Australia
Floyd the Android †	—N/a	Jonathan Lyons	United States
Pishto Goes Away †	—N/a	Sonya Kendel	Russia
Corrida †	—N/a	Janis Cimermanis	Latvia
Colored Pencil †	—N/a	Alice Gomes	Brazil
Minato Screening Program B
Kauwboy	—N/a	Boudewijn Koole	Netherlands
Floyd the Android †	—N/a	Jonathan Lyons	United States
Minato Screening Program C
Ernest & Celestine	Ernest et Célestine	Benjamin Renner; Stéphane Aubier; Vincent Patar	France

†: Short film

==== Bunka-Cho Film Awards ====
English title	Original title	Director(s)	Production country
Iyasumonotoshite - The Postwar History of Rural Medical Services	医す者として〜映像と証言で綴る農村医療の戦後史〜	Masayoshi Suzuki	Japan
Never Let Me Go	隣る人	Kazuya Tachikawa	Japan
Living the Silent Spring	沈黙の春を生きて	Masako Sakata	Japan

== Allied-events ==
- Bunka-Cho Film Week 2012
- U. S. -Japan Film Academy
- Tokyo International Women's Film Festival
- TIFF / Tohoku project - Japan in a Day, a single strong step which links us to the future through "The Power of Films, Now!"
- Symposium on Motion-Picture Filming
- The Forest of the Asian Cinema
- Masayuki Suo Film Festival
- Korean Cinema Week 2012
- Short Shorts Film Festival & Asia "Focus on Asia" & Workshop
- China Film Week in Tokyo 2012
- Future Line-up Collection of Tokyo International Film Festival
- Tanabe-Benkei Film Festival 2012
- Polish Film Festival in Japan 2012
- CineGrid@TIFF 2012
- Economic Contribution of the Japanese Film and Television Broadcast Industry
- Regional Cooperation between Hong Kong and Japan
- JFC Locations Fair 2012
- Green Energy Festa in TIFF

== Awards ==
Competition

- Tokyo Sakura Grand Prix - The Other Son by Lorraine Lévy
- Special Jury Prize - Juvenile Offender by Kang Yi-kwan
- Award for Best Director - Lorraine Lévy for The Other Son
- Award for Best Actress - Neslihan Atagül for Araf - Somewhere in Between
- Award for Best Actor - Seo Young-ju for Juvenile Offender
- Award for Best Artistic Contribution - Ship of Theseus (Director of Photography: Pankaj Kumar)
- The Audience Award - Flashback Memories 3D by Tetsuaki Matsue

Toyota Earth Grand Prix

- Grand Prix - Himself He Cooks by Valerie Berteau and Philippe Witjes
- Special Jury Prize - Trashed by Candida Brady

Winds of Asia-Middle East

- Best Asian-Middle Eastern Film Award - Night of Silence by Reis Çelik
- Special Mention
  - Bwakaw by Jun Robles Lana
  - Him, Here After by Asoka Handagama
  - Full Circle by Zhang Yang

Japanese Eyes

- Best Picture Award - GFP Bunny by Yutaka Tsuchiya

TIFF Special Appreciation Award

- TIFF Special Appreciation Award - Raymond Chow

== Juries ==
=== Competition ===
- Roger Corman, American director and producer (President)
- Luc Roeg, British producer
- Yōjirō Takita, Japanese director
- Emanuele Crialese, Italian screenwriter and director
- Kyoko Heya, Japanese production designer

=== Winds of Asia-Middle East ===
- Harumi Nakayama, Japanese cinema journalist
- Koichi Kawakami, Japanese director of photography
- Lim Kah Wai, Malaysian director

=== Japanese Eyes ===
- Kyoichiro Murayama, Japanese critic
- Yoshihiro Fukagawa, Japanese director
- Genki Kawamura, Japanese producer

=== Toyota Earth Grand Prix ===
- Yukichi Shinada, Japanese critic
- Masako, Japanese model and actress
- Tatsumi Yoda, Chairman of Tokyo International Film Festival
