= Go/Nitro =

American sports television series

- Genre: Sports/reality
- Starring: Emily Fulford, Carolyn Waldo
- Composers: Cory Carlick (Skycron)
- Countries of origin: United States, Canada
- Original language: English
- No. of seasons: 2
- No. of episodes: 39

Production
- Producer: Cory Carlick
- Running time: 24 minutes
- Production company: Skycron

Original release
- Network: Syndicated
- Release: December 2019 – 2021

Go/Nitro is an American sports television series created by Saskatchewan Canada-based production company Skycron. The series was first picked up for syndication in the United States by WBBJ-TV in Jackson, Tennessee and began airing in December 2019. By the end of 2020, the show had programming arrangements with a number of US broadcast media holdings. In Canada, Go/Nitro runs on SaskTel VOD on MaxTV and also began running on Game+ in March 2021.

The premise of Go/Nitro is that "Every Athlete has a First Day", which is also its slogan. Hosts Emily Fulford and Carolyn Waldo are shown trying out different sports and athletic jobs to prove that there is no shame in being a beginner and that it is never too late to try something new. The series is family-friendly and shows that many sports are harder than they look, but with hard work and proper instruction, anybody is capable of learning and enjoying new sports.

In each episode either one or two sports are covered in a half-hour format. Season One episodes featured Nascar (Alex Tagliani), NCAA (Syracuse Orange women's basketball), Joseph Polossifakis, Maria Toorpakai Wazir, the Saskatchewan Rattlers, The Saskatchewan Rush, Henry Burris, Dan Tessier, Rick Heinz Goalie & Hockey School, PGA, Curlsask, Ben Young, Graeme Murray, and The Ottawa Hospital. The show also features ongoing segments addressing sports injury prevention with Dr. Chris Raynor, an orthopedic surgeon, sports medicine specialist, and owner and founder of Human 2.0, a health and conditioning center in Ottawa. In 2021, Skycron began doing live segments with interviews relating to the series.

The television series has been featured on a number of news outlets since it began airing in the United States and then Canada. The most recent Canadian broadcaster to pick up the show is Game+, which is also home to the Saskatchewan-based series The Rod Peterson Show.
