= Boxen (C. S. Lewis) =

Collection of stories by C. S. and W. H. Lewis

First edition (publ. Collins)

Boxen: The Imaginary World of the Young C. S. Lewis is a collection of stories created by C. S. Lewis ("Jack") and his brother W. H. Lewis ("Warnie") as children. The stories were edited by Walter Hooper and first published posthumously by Collins on May 28, 1985.

The world of Boxen was created when Jack's stories about Animal-Land and Warnie's stories about India were brought together. In Surprised by Joy, Jack explains that the union of Animal-Land and India took place "sometime in the late eighteenth century (their eighteenth century, not ours)".

During a time when influenza was ravaging many families, the Lewis brothers were forced to stay indoors and entertain themselves by reading. They read whatever books they could find, both those written for children and adults. Influenced by Beatrix Potter's animals, C.S. Lewis wrote about Animal-Land, complete with details about its economics, politics/government, and history, as well as illustrations of buildings and characters.

The first American edition was published by Harcourt Brace Javanovich, October 17, 1985 (republished as Boxen: Childhood Chronicles Before Narnia). In 2025, Variety magazine confirmed that Jared Mass, formerly of Paramount Animation, had plans to produce an animated adaptation his company Chalkdust Animation Studios. In July, the Midnight Road website released the first look artwork
