= Littlenobody =

- Littlenobody Logo
- Company type: Animation Studio
- Industry: stop-motion animation Pixilation
- Founded: 2004
- Headquarters: South East England, England, UK
- Key people: Karen Penman; Liam Brazier; Greg Kitten

Littlenobody, founded by Karen Penman, is a small animation collective working from the South East of England.

Littlenobody Productions specialise in animation and have screened projects in competition at Bradford Animation Festival, Encounters Film Festival, Northern Lights Film Festival and Interfilm Berlin as well as Clermont-Ferrands Film market.

Represented by Ouat Media in Canada, with projects sold to A-one Films and The Short Film Channel Movieola.

Littlenobody were shortlisted down to the final 12 for the Virgin Media short competition meaning their first animated short What Cassandra Saw is BBFC certificated is screening in 212 cinemas UK wide from July 2008 till July 2009. Littlenobody won the 4TALENT animation award for 2008 and featured in a double page spread in the 4Talent Magazine.

They were runners up in the 4mations Digital shorts South East Funding Scheme and completed Weather Beaten their second animated short for the Commonwealth Vision awards 2009, Final 10 in competition.

Most recently they have been awarded funding for their latest stop motion animated short I Wish I Were an Elephant from the UK Film Council, New Cinema Fund, Digital Shorts Scheme via regional screen agency Screen East.

== Littlenobody Projects to date ==
- I Wish I Were an Elephant - Funded by Screen East & UK Film Council - September 2011
- Ballad of a Poor Man - Music Video for Vaughn King - December 2009
- Magpie - Short Film - September 2009
- Weather Beaten - Short Film for Commonwealth Vision Awards - January 2009
- Every Time I close my Eyes - Music Video for Clare Blackman - December 2008
- Two Times, Three Times for - Music Video for Reason or Romanza - April 2008
- Interduvet Yarns - Music Video for Hybernation - November 2007
- What Cassandra Saw - Short Film - September 2007
- Yeah, You can me my Muse - Music Video for Amplifico - August 2007
- Visual for multimedia events - Shoplands with Sutton - July 2007
- Thou Shalt Always Kill - Music Video for Dan le sac vs Scroobius Pip - April 2007
- Music monkeys - Music Video for BB Music House - August 2006
- Showreel Littlenobody For 2008

== Littlenobody Festivals, Awards and Screenings to date ==
- Cambridge Film Festival 31st 2011 - EM Media Digital Shorts - I Wish I Were an Elephant
- Animated Encounters 16th International Film Festival 2010 - Channel 4 Industry screening - I Wish I Were an Elephant
- Nozstock Festival 2010 - Thou Shalt Always Kill & Interduvet Yarns, Herefordshire
- 4Talent Animation Award Channel 4 - 2008
- Final 12 Virgin Media Shorts 2008 - What Cassandra Saw - Year tour in over 212 cinemas on 35mm
- London Socialist Film Co-op screening 2008 - Thou Shalt Always Kill
- Sundown Multimedia Night 2008 - What Cassandra Saw & Interduvet Yarns
- ZEBRA Poetry Berlin Film Festival 2008 - Interduvet Yarns
- Southend Six Festival 2008 - What Cassandra Saw
- Clermont-Ferrand Shorts Market 2008 - What Cassandra Saw & Thou shalt Always Kill
- Northern Lights Film Festival 2007 - What Cassandra Saw
- Envy Post - Industry screening 2007 - Thou Shalt Always Kill
- Interfilm Berlin 2007 - Thou Shalt Always Kill
- Encounters Bristol Short Film Festival 2007 - Thou Shalt Always Kill
- The National Media Museum Bradford Animation Film Festival 2007 - Thou Shalt Always Kill,
- Sutton with Shoplands in Rochford Festival 2007 - Visuals
- LFS Leigh-on-Sea Film Society Film Festival 2007 - Thou Shalt Always Kill

== Reviews ==
The 4Talent Animation Award was judged by Ruth Fielding, Lupus Films and animation consultant to Channel 4, and Helen Brunsdon, Development Executive at Aardman who said regarding Littlenobody's portfolio “Stand out work with a real wow-factor. Impressive and diverse use of techniques and an ability to challenge the viewer and themselves. Given a chance and some decent budgets, you just know these two talented animators are going to go on to bigger and better things. We were also very impressed by their ability to self promote via their website.”.

Ian Lumsden World animation blogger adds "I first noticed their music video Thou Shalt Always Kill when I previewed the weekend's BAF 07. It was most professionally done. I was therefore impressed to discover it was produced by a fledgling studio. Also surprising is the diversity of work produced in a short period of time .........Sometimes the combination of live action and animation jars. This is decidedly not the case here. Filters, excellent lighting, interesting camera angles and stop motion techniques, together with animated twinkling effects lead naturally into the interspersed animated sections. Their website is developing apace and belies its short life........A perfect blend of traditional animation and eye popping contemporary film-making. Karen is a fizzing PR machine and it helps if you have quality to sell because they are pretty special in that department too .....There is a beauty bestowed on the scene and always there is an edgy magic to the production. An imaginative, original approach."
