= Lifeboat Luke =

Lifeboat Luke is an animated 52x5 min TV action adventure series set in the magical town of Donaghadoo. Directed and designed by Alastair McIlwain, produced by Richard Morss and Darryl Collins (first 13 episodes), the series has aired in Ireland on RTÉ Two on DEN TOTS and in over twenty territories worldwide.

The search and rescue series for 4-7 year olds is fast and full of visual jokes and eccentric characters with strong sea safety messages for children running through the episodes.

Lifeboat Luke is the first 52-part animation series originating and produced in Northern Ireland and was financed through a combination of private investment and the Northern Ireland Screen Lottery Production Fund including the Irish Film Board, the Broadcast Commission Ireland Sound & Vision, Northern Ireland Screen Commission, Banjax Studios (first 13 episodes), and RTÉ. The series was a co-production with Kavaleer in Dublin.

Luke the Lifeboat Ltd, producers of the series, are working in an exclusive partnership with the Royal National Lifeboat Institution.

The first 13 episodes were produced at Banjax Studios, based in Belfast, with LTL Production, based in Holywood, Northern Ireland, producing the remaining 39 episodes and delivering the entire 52-episode series. The licensing and commercialisation of the property is now being carried out by Straandlooper Animation.

== Characters ==
Luke - a lifeboat who helps his friends.
