= Bird Studios =

British animation company

Bird Studios is a UK production company, founded in 2003, specializing in design, computer animation, and visual effects for TV, film, and the digital world.

Designer/animator Ian Bird is the managing and creative director. The company specializes in combining photo-realistic 3D computer animation with live action as well as stand-alone CGI animation and character animation.

== History ==
Bird Studios evolved through a number of companies (Electric Image, Framestore CFC, SOHO 601FX, EYE Animation) under the direction of Ian Bird, producing broadcast title sequences, commercials, and music videos.

== Projects ==
Bird studios re-created one of its award-winning music promos, the Pet Shop Boys "Liberation" from their album Very for IMAX as part of its 70 mm stereoscopic 3D film, CyberWorld,

Ian Bird worked with Roger Avary to create the animation and special effects for Sci-Fi TV Film Mr. Stitch, starring Rutger Hauer and Wil Wheaton for Rysher Entertainment.

== Credits ==
- Commercials: P&G Bounty "Robots", ICRC "Abuse grows hatred", BBC "Wimbledon", Nurofen "For Children", Diet Coke "sponsoring Will & Grace", Npower "New friend", NHS "Flu-Jab", The Times "food guide", Save the Children "Poverty".
- Music Videos: Iron Maiden "Wildest Dreams", "Different World", Robert Post "Got None", Pet Shop Boys "Liberation", "Yesterday, When I was mad", "Single Bi-lingual", a-ha "Analogue", Soundgarden "Black Hole Sun", Mike Oldfield "Let there be light", Meat Loaf "I'd Lie for You (And That's the Truth)".
- Title Sequences: Wogan, Des O'Connor Tonight, The Chart Show, Little Napoleons, Capital City, Dennis Potter's Lipstick on Your Collar, Fay Weldon's The Life and Loves of a She-Devil and The South Bank Show.

== Awards ==
- Best TV Sport Commercial: Gold Medal winner – BBC WIMBLEDON "Breaking of champions".
- New York Festivals 'World Medal': Gold Medal winner – International TV advertising. "Save The Children".
- International Broadcasting Awards: Graphic Artist of the Year – Ian Bird
- Golden Award of Montreaux: Best Animation - Milky Way "Magic Stars"
- Golden Award of Montreaux: Best Commercial - Ford Ka "Travelogue"
- Imagina: Best Computer Animation - Martell "Art of Cognac"
- Leaf: Best Music Promo - Mike Oldfield "Let there be light"
- Nicograph Grand Prix: Art Prize winner - Martell "Art of Cognac"
- Art Directors Club (New York): Gold Award Best Music Video - The Pet Shop Boys "Liberation"
- MTV Awards: Best Music Promo - Soundgarden "Black Hole Sun"
- Royal Television Society: Gold Team Award - Dennis Potter’s "Lipstick On Your Collar"
- Computer Animation Festival: Best Programme Content - Channel Four "High-Tech Dreams"
- Parigraph: Winner Advertising Grand Prix - "Dubro Dojke Holland"
- International Monitor Awards: Best titles - BBC Barry Norman's "Talking Pictures"

== See also ==
- List of animation studios
