= Sue, Mai & Sawa: Righting the Girl Ship =

- Film poster
- Directed by: Osamu Minorikawa
- Written by: Sachiko Tanaka
- Based on: Su-chan by Miri Masuda
- Produced by: Yoshitaka Takeda; Kasumi Yao
- Cinematography: Gen Kobayashi
- Edited by: Hidemi Ri
- Music by: Shin Kono; Kasarinchu
- Release dates: October 24, 2012 (Tokyo); March 2, 2013 (Japan)
- Running time: 106 minutes
- Country: Japan
- Language: Japanese

Sue, Mai & Sawa: Righting the Girl Ship (Japanese: すーちゃん まいちゃん さわ子さん, Hepburn: Sū-chan Mai-chan Sawako-san) is a 2012 Japanese drama film directed by Osamu Minorikawa and based on the manga series Su-chan by Miri Masuda. It premiered at the 25th Tokyo International Film Festival on October 24, 2012, and was released in Japan on March 2, 2013.

== Cast ==
- Kō Shibasaki as Yoshiko Morimoto
- Yōko Maki as Maiko Okamura
- Shinobu Terajima as Sawako Hayashi
- Shōta Sometani as Kosuke Chiba
- Arata Iura as Seichiro Nakata
- Hana Kino as Yoko Koba
- Poon-chaw Guin as Nobuko Hayashi
- Akiko Kazami as Shizue Hayashi
- Megumi Sato as Mika Iwai
- Mio Uema as Chika Takeda
- Aoi Yoshikura as Minami Koba
- Ai Takabe as Chigusa Maeda

== Reception ==
=== Critical response ===
On Film Business Asia, Derek Elley gave the film a 6 out of 10, calling it "a mature chick-flick with a fine array of actresses but rather over-slack pacing."

=== Accolades ===
Award	Date	Category	Result	Recipients and nominees
Kinema Junpo Awards	2014	Best Actress	Won	Yōko Maki
