= Nikté =

- Directed by: Ricardo Arnaiz
- Written by: Antonio Garci; Omar Mustre
- Produced by: Soco Aguilar
- Starring: Sherlyn; Pierre Angelo; Pedro Armendáriz Jr; Alex Lora; Maya Zapata; Regina Orozco; Jorge Arvizu; Silverio Palacios; Regina Torné; Enrique Garay
- Edited by: Ricardo Arnaiz; Gabriel Villar
- Music by: Gabriel Villar
- Production company: Animex Producciones
- Distributed by: Universal Pictures (Mexico only)
- Release date: December 18, 2009
- Running time: 93 minutes
- Country: Mexico
- Language: Spanish
- Budget: $2.4 million

Nikté is a 2009 Mexican animated adventure comedy film, produced by Soco Aguilar and Nahuala Producciones. It stars the voices of Sherlyn as the title character, Pierre Angelo, Pedro Armendáriz Jr, Alex Lora, Jorge Arvizu, and Regina Torné. It premiered in theaters on December 18, 2009.

== Plot ==
The story starts with a girl and her family at La Venta park. The girl only thinks about herself, and her family goes with the tour guide while she stays at the entrance listening to her music. She leans on the Olmec head and discovers something in the Olmec head which she is transferred back to the times of Olmec.

== Cast ==
- Sherlyn as Nikté
- Pierre Angelo as Chin
- Pedro Armendáriz Jr as Kaas
- Alex Lora as Chamán Chanek
- Maya Zapata as Xtabay
- Regina Orozco as Ij' Aesu
- Jorge Arvizu as Guardián de Roca
- Silverio Palacios as Jéfe Chaneke
- Regina Torné as Diosa Luna / Meztli
- Enrique Garay as Kike Garaytl

== Production ==
Animex Producciones was in charge of coordinating the production which involved several animation studios in Mexico, including Grupo EsComic! and Estudio Haini.

== Box office ==
This film was a box-office failure, due to an unsuccessful competition with James Cameron's Avatar.

== Character name dispute and lawsuit ==
On October 10, 2009, Rolando Tamayo sued director Ricardo Arnaiz over the film's plagiarized characters called "Nikté", "Kan" and "Kin". in 2019 the film was considered illegal by Instituto Mexicano de Propiedad Industrial after it used already existing characters without the owner's consent.
