= Gus (2011 film) =

2011 short film by Andrew Martin

- Official poster for Gus.
- Directed by: Andrew Martin
- Written by: Andrew Martin
- Produced by: Andrew Martin
- Starring: Ray Sinclair; Jacob Worth
- Music by: Liam Flenady; Lisa Cheney
- Production company: Honeydew Studios
- Release date: July 2011 (Anima Mundi)
- Running time: 8 minutes
- Country: Australia
- Language: English Japanese

Gus is a 2011 Australian animated short film produced by Honeydew Studios in Brisbane, Australia. It is written, directed, animated and produced by Andrew Martin. The music is composed by Liam Flenady and Lisa Cheney, and the sound design is by John Willsteed. It has won multiple awards on the international festival circuit, including Best Short Film Script and Best Short Animation at the Monaco International Film Festival, and Best Animation at the Queensland New Filmmakers Awards in 2011. Gus is Andrew Martin's filmmaking debut and the first production for his company Honeydew Studios.

== Synopsis ==
Official Trailer for Gus

An adorable young "cave" boy named Gus and his powerful hunter father Don live a cold and isolated life high in the Swiss Alps, banished by their disgruntled tribe because of Gus' chronic explosive flatulence. His flatus is so insidious it repels entire herds and spoils food from afar. Despite all this, his father stands by him until one day, reaching breaking point, he sends Gus out into the cold and unforgiving mountainside to protect their food, a decision that would change life forever...

== Awards and nominations ==
Festival	Year	Award	Nominee	Result
Blue Mountains Film Festival	2011	Animation Prize	N/A	Won
FirstGlance Film Festival Philadelphia	2011	Best Director (Animation)	Andrew Martin	Won
Lucerne International Film Festival	2011	Best Animated Movie	N/A	Nominated
Village Roadshow Queensland New Filmmakers Awards	2011	Best Animation	N/A	Won
Village Roadshow Queensland New Filmmakers Awards	2011	Best Film	N/A	Nominated
Village Roadshow Queensland New Filmmakers Awards	2011	Best Direction	Andrew Martin	Nominated
Monaco International Film Festival	2011	Best Short Film Script	N/A	Won
Monaco International Film Festival	2011	Best Short Animation	N/A	Won
Milan International Film Festival	2012	Short Film Award	N/A	Nominated
Shorts in Paradise Film Festival	2012	Runner Up Award	N/A	Won
WorldFest Houston International Film Festival and Video Festival	2012	Special Jury Remi	N/A	Won
Janison Short Sharp Film Festival	2012	Animation Grand Prize	N/A	Won
Create Design Awards	2012	Motion Category	N/A	Nominated
St Kilda Film Festival	2013	Best Comedy	N/A	Won
