= Lumicel Animation Studios =

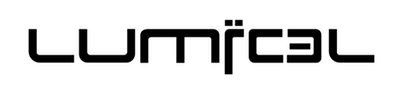
- Company type: Private Company
- Industry: Animation
- Founded: 2009; 17 years ago
- Headquarters: Trivandrum, India
- Area served: Worldwide
- Website: www.lumicelstudios.com

Lumicel Animation Studios, also known as Lumicel Studios, or simply as Lumicel, is an international animation studio and entertainment company. Lumicel is known for films and animated series made using 2D animation techniques. Studio is developing original children's animation content and series such as Hana Dreams, Tak Ku T Island, Bubly, Utopia Gardens etc.

Lumicel acts as both executive producer and line producer of the programs it develops and also co-produces content with other partners. Lumicel is a fully integrated animation studio that ensures development, funding, production, marketing, and commercialization.

Lumicel is known for creating visual animation content for well known Australian music band Piperlain, John Paul Vaathil Thurakkunnu, 2D animation series such as Sweet Little Monsters, Atchoo!, Eena Meena Deeka (TV series), Astra Force, Tik Tak Tail, Polar Adventure, Hazar, OPS – What an hOPSrible pack!, Berry Bees, Sweet Little Monsters etc, Luna Agonia feature film animation and Eider short-film animation.

== Filmography ==
Upcoming original television series

#	Title	Role	Format	Release date
1	Hana Dreams	Producer	52 X 11'	2019
2	Tak Ku T Island	Producer	104 X 7'	2019
3	Bubly	Producer	104 X 7'	2020
4	Zyten	Producer	52 X 11'	2020
5	Utopia Gardens	Producer	208 X 3'	2019

== Television Animation Series Productions ==
Original Run	Series	Channel	Notes
2017-2022	Atchoo!	RAI Ragazzi; DeA Kids; Clan (TV channel); National Geographic Kids; Amazon Video (India)	Episodes: The Old Willy, Toe Detective, Future Story, Secret, Make sure you understand, Teo the dog sitter, The Principal's Principal etc
2013 - 2014	Eena Meena Deeka (TV series)	Hungama TV	Episodes: EMD in Desert, EMD Antarctica, EMD Formula 1, EMD Railway, Oceanliner, Uncle's Invention, Haunted house, Bhukkad Vampire, Baseball etc
2019 -	Hazar	TBD	Pre-production & Animation producer Episodes: TBD
2019 -	The Rockheads Rockology	TBD	Pre-production & Animation producer Episodes:TBD
2019-2022	OPS – What an hOPSrible pack!	RAI Ragazzi	Episodes: Mission Cupid, Genius At Rest, Super Weirdo, The Clothes Don't Make the Genius, Awake Forever, Uncle Francis, Photogenic Enough to Kill, Non-Fear, Shocky Runs out of energy, Shockingly Light
2019-2022	Berry Bees	RAI Ragazzi; Nine Network	Episodes: CHINEESE SHADOWS, License to Munch, TBD
2021–present	Sweet Little Monsters (fr)	Futurikon; M6 (TV channel); Canal+ Family; Télétoon+	Season 4 Episodes: 26 Episodes

== Feature Animation Production ==
Release date	Movie	Role
2019	Luna Agonia	Animation production company
