= Piranha NYC =

American company

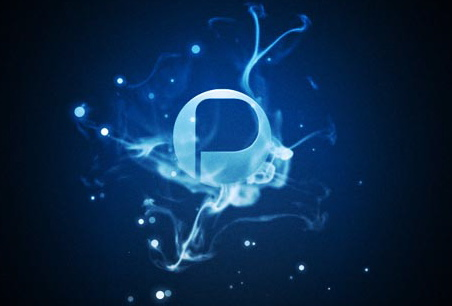
- Piranha NYC Logo (2009–present)
- Company type: Corporation
- Industry: CGI animation; editing; sound design; original music production
- Founded: September 19, 2009
- Founder: Gaspard Giroud, Rob Sabatini
- Headquarters: New York, NY, United States
- Area served: Worldwide
- Key people: Gaspard Giroud, Rob Sabatini, Thomas Edward Allen, Scott Neuberger
- Website: piranhanyc.com

Piranha NYC /ˈpɪrænhə/ is a motion graphics, design, and VFX house founded in 2009 by Gaspard Giroud and Rob Sabatini in SoHo, New York City. Piranha's clients include Intel, Verizon, Coca-Cola, Nike, Reebok, L'oreal, IBM, Delta Air Lines, Mercedes, Trojan, Lucky, Sony Ericsson, Wired, UPS, KMart, HBO.

3D World Magazine listed Piranha as one of the ten hottest CG studios of 2012, in part of their visualization of the New World Trade Center, that was featured in several architectural publications. The company was twice nominated for New York Emmy Awards in category of graphics.

Piranha NYC also worked on 3D modelling for the Sex and the City movie. The company partnered with Fluid in 2009 to provide 3D and visual work.

At the beginning of 2012 Piranha participated in the CGarchitect 3D awards competition with their film created for Silverstein Properties. It has been selected as one of the five nominees in the category of Architectural Film/Animation (Commissioned).

The company created the visual accompaniment of Rihanna to play behind Coldplay while performing their single "Princess of China" on 2012 tour.

In September 2012 3D World Magazine named Piranha to Arch-Viz Animation winner in the 2012 CG Awards.
