= H-Gun =

H-Gun Labs, officially H-Gun Corp. (1988–2001), was a film and animation consortium that started in Chicago and expanded to include a San Francisco studio. Founded by Eric Zimmermann and Benjamin Stokes, H-Gun began as a collective of art, film, and music students from The School of The Art Institute of Chicago and Columbia College. The H-Gun moniker emerged as an anagram of the Zimmermann/Stokes' "UNGH!" band name when the group began making music videos for their own tracks, and eventually for other bands.

== Founding ==
H-Gun consisted of a core group of employees and many independent contractors. Being a Chicago-based music video company when the industry was dominated by East Coast and West Coast production companies meant H-Gun could operate at a smaller scale, producing experimental, low budget work with up and coming directors and attracting clients and talent that valued H-Gun's core tenets.

The early music video work for Ungh! led to commissions from recording artists including: Nine Inch Nails (Down in It), Ministry, Iron Maiden, Soundgarden (Jesus Christ Pose, Rusty Cage), Melvins, and many more. Later music video and collaboration work expanded to include electronic acts such as Meat Beat Manifesto and the Orb through Stokes' involvement and ties via Dimensional Holofonic Sound.

The two original founding members Eric Zimmermann and Ben Stokes were joined by Eric Koziol (a fellow School of the Art Institute of Chicago collaborator), and freelance producer Jim Deloye. Other contributors to H-Gun were Eric Matthies, Wing Ko, CW Hayes, Elizabeth Biron, Barbara Schwarz, Dawn Rubin, Adrian Dimond, Maximum Greyspace, David Marine, Craig Coutts, Roxanna Markewiecz, Mak Knighton, Dawn Smallman, Damon Meena, Laura Dame, Robert Bial, Lisa Rubinelli, Jason Voke, Chris O'Dowd, Tau Gerber, James Colao, Vello Virkhaus, Robert Coddington, Davy Force, John Goodman, Ivan DeWolfe, Jon Schnepp, Patsy Desmond, Danielle Beverly, Ty Bardi, Sheleigh Highsmith, and scores of interns, freelancers, friends and collaborators.

== Style, notable work and technology ==
The artists at H-Gun approached filmmaking in a renegade, experimental style and fully embraced a "run and gun" aesthetic. H-Gun were early adopters in the use of Apple Macintosh computers and the earliest versions of animation software. As the company evolved, the collective pursued work in broadcast design (including network branding/identity packages, network IDs, and main titles) and commercials in addition to continued music video production. Dedicated to in-house production and experimental techniques, H-Gun became one of the few companies (at the time) that would shoot its own live-action film, design its own motion graphics and 2D/3D animation, and integrate the work into its own finished pieces. By the late 90s, the work regularly garnered worldwide attention and industry accolades. Soundgarden re-released the videos H-Gun produced and directed on its CD/DVD compilation "Telephantasm", and H-Gun's work often won international awards with Promax / BDA, International Monitor Awards, Billboard Music Video Awards and the like.

As H-Gun evolved, the company worked with directors Frank Kozik, David Yow, Paul Andresen, Nancy Bardawil and other notable directors.

H-Gun videos were often featured on marquee MTV shows such as 120 Minutes, Headbangers Ball, and Beavis and Butt-Head.

== Closure ==
In the summer of 2000, the company decided that it would close its doors and that the owners would remain friends and explore other creative endeavors. The official closing date for the last delivery of commissioned work was January 2001.

== Clients ==
- MTV
- Cartoon Network
- Turner Classic Movies
- TNT
- Nickelodeon
- Pillsbury
- Locomotion
- M2
- Comedy Central
- MTV Latin America
- E! Entertainment Television
- Nickelodeon Russia
- Bravo
- NBC
- G4
- Lifetime
- A&E
- Discovery Channel
- Food Network
- YTV
- W
