= Daisuke Shimote =

Japanese filmmaker and screenwriter (born 1976)

- Born: Shimote Daisuke; June 13, 1976 (age 50); Gifu Prefecture, Japan
- Occupations: Screenwriter, Filmmaker

Daisuke Shimote (下手 大輔, Shimote Daisuke; born June 13, 1976) is a Japanese filmmaker and screenwriter from Gifu prefecture.

== Filmography ==
- Kuro (2012), shown at the 25th Tokyo International Film Festival
