= Skycron =

Canadian film studio

Skycron is an animation studio located in Melville, Saskatchewan, Canada, which concentrates on original properties as well as television commercials and public service announcements. Originally formed as an independent record label, it established itself as an important Ottawa studio when it landed the contract for public service announcement for Child & Youth Friendly Ottawa, a youth advocacy group. The announcement was subsequently run on CJOH-TV, the capital's affiliate of Canada's largest private broadcaster, CTV, giving the studio substantial exposure.

The founder of Skycron, Cory Carlick, was just 16 when the company was formed. The company got its start when Carlick's music was accidentally discovered on the Internet by an Ottawa broadcaster, who liked the work. The company has subsequently produced numerous spots in English and French for broadcasters and clients across North America and Europe, as well as original programming for syndication. Notable projects include the official music video, "La tête en l'air" for Quebec supergroup Kain; Go/Nitro, a sports series produced for Bell Media (parent of Canadian broadcasters CTV and TSN).

In December 2019, Go/Nitro began running in syndication in the United States. WBBJ-TV, a CBS and ABC affiliate in Jackson, Tennessee, was the first American station to run the series, quickly followed by stations in South Dakota and New York state. Skycron owns a syndication division that handles advertising and placement of its programs, and has programming agreements with numerous major US broadcasting media holdings, including Gray Television and Sinclair Broadcast Group. It also produces content for major sports organizations, including the Saskatchewan Rattlers of the CEBL.

Skycron has been profiled on CTV Ottawa on two occasions: in 2003 for its musical involvement, and again in the beginning of 2005 for its public service announcement and for an anti-bullying brochure, "Back Off", produced for the Canadian Teachers' Federation.
