= Floating City =

2012 Chinese-Hong Kong film by Yim Ho

- Chinese film poster
- Directed by: Yim Ho
- Written by: Marco Pong; Yim Ho
- Produced by: Carl Change; Yim Ho
- Starring: Aaron Kwok; Charlie Young; Annie Liu; Josie Ho
- Cinematography: Ardy Tam
- Edited by: Stanley Tam
- Music by: Yim Linq
- Production companies: Mandarin Films; Sil-Metropole Organisation
- Release dates: 18 May 2012 (China); 19 May 2012 (Hong Kong)
- Running time: 104 minutes
- Countries: China; Hong Kong
- Language: Cantonese

Floating City (Chinese: 浮城; Jyutping: fau4 seng4) is a 2012 drama film directed by Yim Ho. A Chinese-Hong Kong co-production, the film was released on 18 and 19 May 2012 in mainland China and Hong Kong respectively.

== Premise ==
The story of a self-made man in a rapidly changing Hong Kong at the end of British Colonial rule.

== Reception ==
Exclaim! writer Robert Bell said "...the subject matter of Floating City doesn't come as a surprise, mirroring the life of a self-made man with the rapid change of Hong Kong from small fishing village to booming metropolis over latter half of the 20th Century. But what does surprise is just how amateurish and sloppy it all is, which is of substantial concern with such an epic and ambitious project."

DVD Talk reviewer Thomas Spurlin said "As a whole, the impression I took away from Floating City is that of an overwrought and disjointed meditation on the value of life and the injustice of misfortune, a melodrama that confuses its soapbox-worthy communication of social issues and generational shifts in China for an enriching tale of cohabiting with them."

PopMatters journalist J.C. Maçek III wrote "First and foremost, Floating City is an incredibly beautiful movie. Director Yim Ho uses his camera lens to drink in the scenery of Hong Kong over a decades-long story that is as beautiful as the scenery itself."
