= Yutaka Tsuchiya =

Tsuchiya Yutaka (土屋豊, Tsuchiya Yutaka) (born 11 December 1966) is a Japanese film director, documentary film maker, and video activist. His works have focused on the search for identity amongst Japanese youth, particularly the allure that nationalism or extreme ideologies have offered to troubled young people.

== Career ==
After producing several experimental video art pieces, Tsuchiya first came to prominence with A New God (Movie), a personal documentary shot on video about his relationship with a right-wing, neo-nationalist punk rock band. Even though Tsuchiya is on the left, he ended up marrying the singer for that band, Karin Amamiya, who has since emerged as a spokesperson for disaffected Japanese youth in the media. The New God won an award at the 1999 Yamagata International Documentary Film Festival. His next work, Peep "TV" Show, was a fictional post-9/11 tale of numbed young people seeking the "real" on a violent, voyeuristic internet site. Eight years passed before he made his next film, GFP Bunny, which won the award for best film in the Japanese Eyes section at the 2012 Tokyo International Film Festival. Tsuchiya is a key organizer in the Japanese left-wing community, founding VideoAct!, an umbrella organization that helps distribute the documentaries and experimental works of many activist organizations.

== Filmography ==
- What Do You Think About the War Responsibility of Emperor Hirohito? (あなたは天皇の戦争責任についてどう思いますか？〈96.8.15靖国篇〉)(1997)
- The New God (新しい神様 Atarashii kamisama) (1999)
- Peep "TV" Show (2003)
- GFP Bunny (2012)
