= Honeydew Studios =

Australian animation studio

Hondeydew Studios
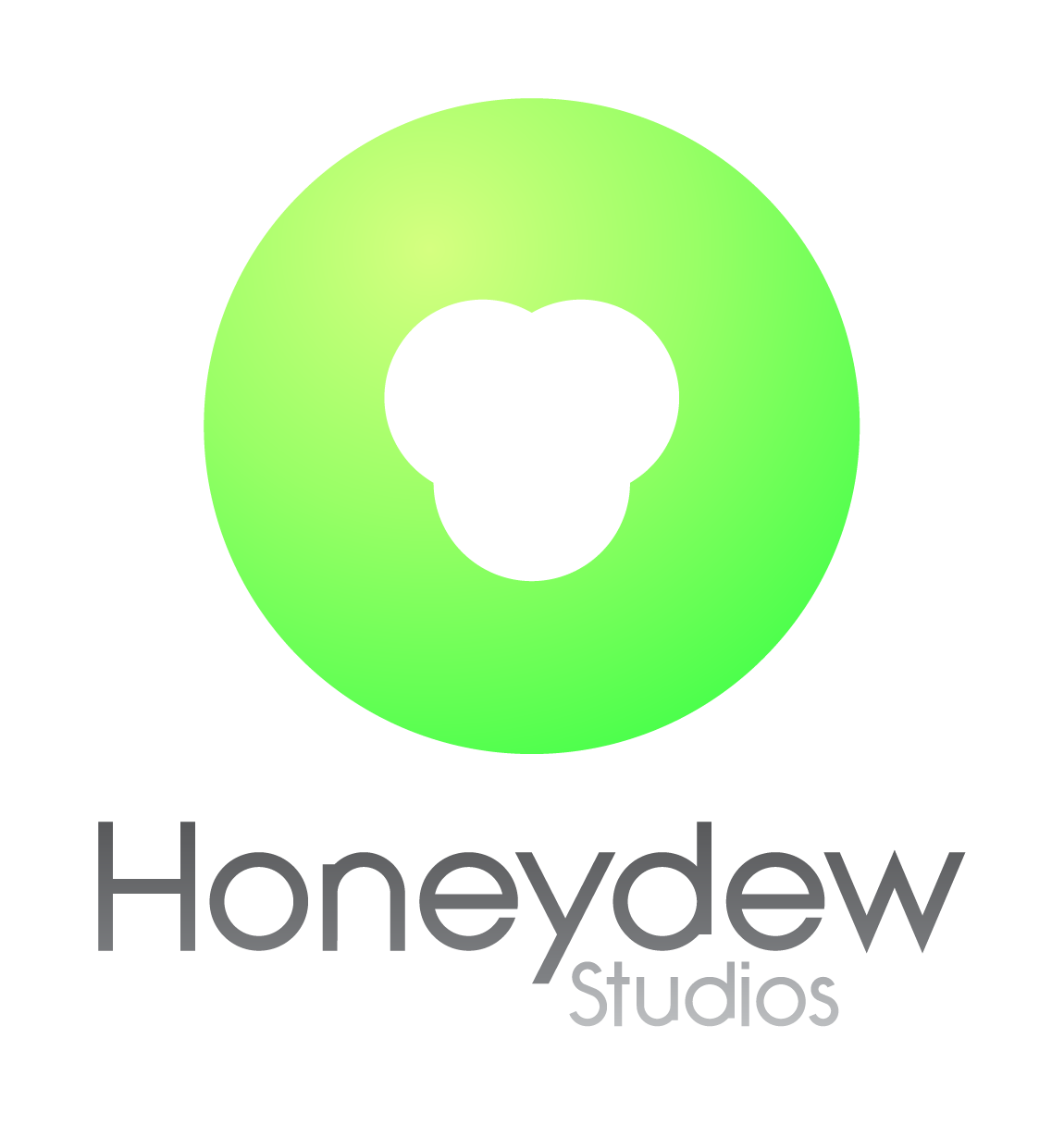
- 2009–Present Logo
- Industry: CGI animation; Motion pictures
- Founded: February 18, 2009; 16 years ago
- Founder: Andrew Martin
- Headquarters: Brisbane, Queensland, Australia
- Website: honeydewstudios.com

Honeydew Studios is a small animation production company in Brisbane, Australia. It was named after a short-lived, Muppet-inspired nickname for its founder. It produced the animated short film Gus in 2011, and is in production of its latest animated short film Levare. The studio reported in July 2025 that Levare was approaching the pre-production phase.

== See also ==
- List of film production companies
- List of television production companies
