= Estudio Haini =

- Company type: Private
- Industry: Animation
- Genre: Animation
- Founded: 2003
- Founder: Tonatiuh Moreno; Ruy Fernando Estrada
- Headquarters: Guadalajara, Mexico
- Key people: Tonatiuh Moreno (Director); Ruy Fernando Estrada
- Products: Animated films
- Website: haini.com.mx

Estudio Haini is an animation studio located in Guadalajara, Mexico, known for the production of CuriosaMente, a YouTube channel for the popularization of knowledge. They are recognized for its short films El relato de Sam Brennan (Sam Brennan's tale) and El funeral de Don Jején (Mr. Sandfly's wake).

The studio was founded in 2003 by Tonatiuh Moreno and Ruy Fernando Estrada when, after completing the pilot episode "Tortas y lagartos" from the series The City of Others, they decided to continue to produce animation, such as There is No Substitute the video that won the A Day Without Water organized by Canal Once (Mexico) in 2004. They won the local contests ConComics and Julio Verne in the comics category and won the design competition for the logo of the Museum of Paleontology of Guadalajara.

The studio is currently working in the pre-production of their first complete feature film, Fausto el Mago Extremo, and are co-producers of the videogame Chaneques

== Relevant films ==
Film	Release date	Director	Credit
El Relato de Sam Brennan	2009	Tonatiuh Moreno	Production studio
Nikté	2009	Ricardo Arnaiz	Rough animation and cleanup
La Revolución de Juan Escopeta	2011	Jorge Estrada	Rough animation and cleanup
El Funeral de Don Jején	2013	Ruy Fernando Estrada	Production studio
Fausto el mago extremo	(In development)	Various	Production studio
CuriosaMente	2015–Present	Tonatiuh Moreno	Production studio, TV Series.
