= LTL Production =

Northern Irish animation studio

LTL Production is an animation studio based in Holywood, County Down, Northern Ireland.

It produces the children's animated television series 'Lifeboat Luke' along with Kavaleer Productions in Dublin, Republic of Ireland.
