= Pbao Chouk Sao =

- Directed by: Tea Lum Kang
- Written by: Tea Lum Kang
- Produced by: Tea Lum Kang
- Starring: Chjea Yuton and Dy Saveth and Mandoline
- Cinematography: Deap Ttrong
- Music by: Sinn Sisamouth
- Distributed by: Deap Va Sing
- Release date: 1967
- Country: Cambodia
- Language: Khmer

Pao Chouk Saw is the story of a girl who was once an angel and later became a human for a particular reason. In order to return to her sisters as an angel again, she has to live in the human world with regular human beings for 17 whole months. She then ends up falling in love with a regular guy. But soon he has to leave her behind for a war without knowing that she is actually an angel taking form of a human being and that she can change back to an angel any time soon after he leaves for the war. He leaves having no idea that once he return from war, she may be gone forever.

== Cast ==
- Chjea Yuton
- Dy Saveth
- Mandoline

== Soundtrack ==
The film soundtrack consists of two notable tracks by Sinn Sisamouth and Ros Sereysothea:

- "Kgeng Ttao Kgeng Ttao" by Ros Serey Sothea
- "Neavea Chjeevit" by Sinn Si Samouth
