= John Lemmon Films =

American animation studio

John Lemmon Films was a traditional character animation studio based in Charlotte, North Carolina, United States, listed among five “prominent animation houses”, that was in operation from 1984 through 2018. Animation hardware designed by the company, called ReadyANIMATOR, continues to be marketed. Initially the animation studio worked exclusively in clay animation, but diversified into stop-motion, 2D animation and Flash animation, as well as web game design. The company produced clay animated TV commercials for clients including: Disney, Cartoon Network and Dairy Queen. The studio created clay-animated versions of well-known products, including the Coleman lantern, and has produced clay animated spots for Tandy Corporation's chain of stores called McDuff Electronics and for Cedar Point.

== History ==
Prior to launching the company the co-founders collaborated on a science fiction film entitled ‘The Star Chasers in the Trontium Tusk’. The eight-minute clay animated movie began airing on the Disney Channel and Showtime in 1984. After seeing the sci-fi short in 1984, Tom Crabtree, the vice president of advertising at Food Lion Supermarkets, hired the company to create two clay animated TV commercials featuring the supermarket's lion mascot.

In 1986 the company used clay animation for an educational video describing how DNA controls the process of protein synthesis inside a human cell. The movie, “DNA and the Protein Express” was produced for Discovery Place, a science museum in Charlotte, North Carolina. The video was part of an exhibit called ‘The Splice of Life’ that traveled worldwide. Currently the video is used by science teachers in schools throughout the US to teach students from middle school through college about gene expression.

In 1991 the studio began work on a series of clay animation television public service announcements on recycling. The nine PSAs feature a character named HenryCycle and are part of a recycling public education campaign that includes trading cards and activity books. The campaign has been used by cities and counties in fifteen states and was adopted statewide in West Virginia in 1994 and in Ohio in 1998. The company also created HenryCycle e-cards for the America Recycles Day website.

The company began producing 2D animation with the ‘HenryCycle Special’, a 23-minute video featuring 2D animated characters over clay backgrounds. A car crash led to more 2D animation work. While waiting in a claims adjuster’s office after the wreck, Lemmon saw a magazine with drawings of characters representing the eegee's restaurant chain. Later the studio was hired to create a 2D animated spot for the chain.

John Lemmon Films created the cover art for Interplay’s hit video game ClayFighter which was released in mid-1994. Another milestone was doing clay animation of Mickey Mouse for the opening shot of a 30 second clay spot for Walt Disney World Resort. The spot premiered in Disney resort hotels in September 2000.

In 2001 the company started creating web games for clients including eegee’s restaurants, NAPA Filters, Raggs Kids Club Band, the Junior League of Charlotte and the Public Library of Charlotte and Mecklenburg County. The studio also created games that appeared on the DVD of Hermie a Common Caterpillar. All of the studio’s games involve character animation created using Adobe Flash.

In 2004, the Public Library of Charlotte and Mecklenburg County hired the company to create a turnkey animation studio for teenagers. Called Studio i, the facility was designed by John Lemmon Films for the library’s new building called ImaginOn. It opened in the fall of 2005. The company later created a portable version of the animation stands in Studio i. The product, called ReadyANIMATOR, is animation equipment that is used in schools and libraries to help students create their own animation.

In 2007 the company released a stormwater education campaign used by government agencies to help fulfill the EPA’s MS4 stormwater education requirements. The campaign, starring a 2D animated character named Sprink, is used by cities across the US to educate residents about preventing runoff pollution. The campaign consists of seven TV public service announcements plus interactive web pages.

Another educational film featuring 2D animation, "Plant Trees Sturdy for the Birdies" which was created for Kids Ecology Corps, premiered at the 22nd Annual Fort Lauderdale International Film Festival in 2007. The film explains how to plant trees that stand up to hurricanes.

The studio put a new twist on 'puppet animation' by creating stop-motion animation of hand and rod puppets for an online game about diet and exercise. The web game, completed in 2009, was based on the puppet show "You Are What You Eat" created by Grey Seal Puppets for The Junior League of Charlotte.

== Awards ==
A clay animation TV spot by John Lemmon Films for Carolina Telephone won the top award in the animated commercials category at the 1986 Houston International Film Festival. ‘DNA and the Protein Express’ won the Gold Award at the 1986 New York Film & TV Festival of New York.
