= Chalkdust Animation Studios =

American animation studio

- Type: Private
- Industry: Animation
- Founded: 2022; 4 years ago
- Founder: Jared Mass
- Headquarters: Atlanta, Georgia U.S
- Website: chalkdustanimation.com

Chalkdust Animation Studios is an American animation studio based in Atlanta, Georgia. Founded in 2022 by Paramount Animation and Reel FX executive Jared Mass.

== Filmography ==
Title	Year(s)	Network	Notes
Boxen	TBA	TBA	
