= List of animated television series of 2017 =

This is a list of animated television series first aired in 2017

Animated television series to air first in 2017
Title	Seasons	Episodes	Country	Year	Original channel	Technique
3 Amigonauts	1	26	Canada	2017	YTV	Flash
Age of Gunslingers	3	36	China	2017–20	Tencent Video	CGI
Aliens Ninano	1	20	South Korea	2017	SBS TV	CGI
All New Jackie Chan Adventures	1	52	China	2017		CGI
The Ancient Welkin	4	49	China	2017–20	iQIYI	Traditional
Andy Pirki	3	80	India	2017	Pogo	CGI
Angry Birds Blues	1	30	Finland	2017	Toons.TV	CGI
Ant-Man	1	6	United States	2017	Disney XD	Traditional
Arthur and the Minimoys	1	26	France	2017	TiJi	CGI
Astrobaldo	1	13	Brazil	2017	TV Brasil	CGI
As Aventuras de Fujiwara Manchester	1	13	Brazil	2017	TV Cultura	CGI
Baahubali: The Lost Legends	5	71	India	2017–20	Amazon Prime Video	Flash
Bad Exorcist	7	91	Poland	2017–present	Showmax; Netflix	Flash
Balloon Barnyard	1	26	Australia	2017	Disney Junior	CGI
Bangle School	1	26	South Korea	2017–18	KBS1	CGI
Banzi's Secret Diary	3	66	South Korea	2017–22	KBS1; KBS2	Flash
Barbie Dreamtopia: The Series	1	26	United States	2017–18	YouTube Kids	CGI
Battle Through the Heavens; Fights Break Sphere	5		China	2017–present	Tencent Video	CGI
Beat Monsters	1	52	South Korea	2017	Cartoon Network	CGI
Belle and Sebastian	1	52	Canada; France	2017–19	Ici Radio-Canada Télé / Knowledge Network; M6 / Piwi + KIKA (Germany); Ketnet (Belgium); RTS Un (Switzerland)	Flash
Beware Earth!	5	74	Russia	2017–19	2×2	Flash
Big Hero 6: The Series	3	56	United States	2017–21	Disney Channel; Disney XD	Traditional
Big Mouth	8	81	United States	2017–25	Netflix	Flash/Traditional
Billy Dilley's Super-Duper Subterranean Summer	1	13	United States	2017	Disney XD	Traditional
Billy the Krill	1	4	Uruguay	2017	TNU	Toon Boom Harmony
Bloody Code	1	26	China	2017–18	iQIYI; Bilibili	CGI
Boomba & Toomba	1	13	South Korea	2017		CGI
Boonie Cubs	5	182	China	2017–present	CCTV-14	CGI
Brewster the Rooster	1	26	Ireland	2017	RTÉ	Flash
Buddy Thunderstruck	1	12	United States	2017	Netflix	Stop motion
Bunsen Is a Beast	2	52	United States	2017–19	Nickelodeon (2017-18); Nicktoons (2018–19)	Flash
Captain Kraken and His Crew	1	26	Russia	2017–19	Moolt in Cinema; YouTube	Flash
Castlevania	4	32	United States	2017–21	Netflix	Traditional
Chuck's Choice	1	20	Canada	2017	YTV	Flash
Cloudy with a Chance of Meatballs	2	104	Canada; United States	2017–18	YTV; Cartoon Network and Boomerang SVOD (season 1)	Toon Boom Harmony
Cuenta la leyenda	1	13	Chile	2017	UCV TV	
Cutie Cubies	2	52	Russia	2017–20	Moolt App; Tlum HD	CGI
Daisy & Ollie	3	52	United Kingdom	2017–present	Cartoonito	Flash
Danger & Eggs	1	13	United States	2017	Amazon Prime Video	Traditional
DanTDM Creates a Big Scene	1	6	United Kingdom	2017	YouTube Premium	Flash/Live-Action
Dennis & Gnasher: Unleashed!	2	103	United Kingdom	2017–21	CBBC	CGI
Doodlebugs	1	6	United Kingdom	2017–18	BBC One	Flash
Dorothy and the Wizard of Oz	3	59	United States	2017–20	Boomerang	Flash
Dragon Egg	1	52	South Korea	2017–19	KBS2; KBS1	CGI
DuckTales (2017)	3	69	United States	2017–21	Disney XD (2017, 2020–21); Disney Channel (2018–19)	Traditional
Emmy & GooRoo	2	156	China; Spain	2017		Flash
Ernest & Celestine, The Collection	2	52	France	2017–21	France 5	CGI
F.A.S.T.	1	26	Russia	2017–19	Moolt App; Tlum HD	Flash/CGI
Fab5 Mission Tango			India	2017	Sony YAY!	Flash
Fast Heroes Sixty	2	11	Germany	2017–19	Funk	
Fatak Patak		4	India	2017	Hungama TV	
Fire Safety with Roy	1	26	South Korea	2017	EBS1	CGI
Freedom Fighters: The Ray	2	12	United States	2017–18	CW Seed	Traditional
Fruit Ninja: Frenzy Force	1	13	United States	2017	YouTube Premium	CGI
Gattu Battu	7	139	India	2017–present	Nickelodeon; Nickelodeon Sonic	CGI
Geo Mecha	2	52	South Korea	2017–18		CGI
Ginger Snaps	1	9	Australia; United States	2017	ABCd	Flash
Glammys School of Fashion Vlog	1	13	Italy	2017	Boing	Toon Boom Harmony
Go! Cartoons	1	12	United States	2017–18	YouTube	
Godofredo	1	13	Brazil	2017	TV Cultura	CGI
GooGoo		26	United States	2017	BabyFirst	CGI/Flash
Guru Aur Bhole			India	2017	Sony YAY!	CGI
Hanazuki: Full of Treasures	2	35	United States	2017–19	YouTube (season 1); Discovery Family (season 2)	Flash
Happy!	2	18	United States	2017–19	Syfy	CGI/Live action
Harry & Larry Pros Who Help		26	United States	2017	BabyFirst	Live action/Flash
Hatchimals	1	15	Canada	2017–18	YouTube	Flash
Helen's Little School	1	52	Canada, France, Ireland, Russia	2017	Knowledge Kids	CGI
Heroes of Envell	2	52	Russia	2017–21	Moolt App	CGI
The Heroic Quest of the Valiant Prince Ivandoe (shorts)	1	10	Denmark; United Kingdom	2017	Cartoon Network; YouTube	Flash
Hogie the Globehopper	1	52	Malaysia	2017		Flash
Homies		86	Russia	2017	Carousel	CGI
Hotel Transylvania: The Series	2	52	Canada; United States	2017–20	Disney Channel; Teletoon	Toon Boom Harmony
Hug Me			Poland	2017	Puls 2	Flash
I'm a Fish	1	52	Ireland	2017	RTÉjr	
I'm Joybo	2	24	China	2017–19	iQIYI; Bilibili; Tencent Video; Youku	CGI
Imaginary Mary	1	9	United States	2017	ABC	CGI/Live action
J-Town	2	24	Indonesia	2017–18	NET	Flash
Javi and the Tree Club	1	15	Argentina	2017	Nat Geo Kids	Flash
Jeff & Some Aliens	1	10	United States	2017	Comedy Central	Traditional/Flash
The Jellies!	2	20	United States	2017–19	Adult Swim	Flash
Júlio e Verne: Os Irmãos Gemiais	1	13	Brazil	2017	TV Cultura	Flash
Kalari Kids	3	60	India	2017–19	Amazon Prime Video	
The King's Avatar	3	44	China	2017–present	Tencent Video	
Kings of Atlantis	1	13	United States	2017	YouTube Premium	CGI
The Kirlian Frequency	2	10	Argentina	2017–21	YouTube; Vimeo; Netflix; Flixxo	
The Kitchen: Animated Series	1	20	Ukraine	2017	Novyi Kanal	CGI
Kody Kapow	1	26	Canada; United States	2017	Sprout	CGI
Księżniczka Hania i Grymasek	4	56	Poland	2017	MiniMini+	Flash
Lazoo	1	13	Canada	2017	CBC Kids	Flash
The Legend of Ancient Soul	1	24	China	2017–18	Tencent Video	CGI
Legend Quest	2	26	Mexico	2017–19	Netflix	Flash
The Legendaries	1	26	France	2017–18	TF1	
Lego Elves: Secrets of Elvendale	1	8	Denmark; United States	2017	Netflix	Traditional
Licht an!	2	20	Germany	2017–22	KiKa	
Little J & Big Cuz	3	40	Australia	2017–21	NITV	Flash
Lost in Oz	2	26	United States	2017–18	Amazon Prime Video	CGI
Lubinho: The Sea Wolf	1	10	Brazil	2017	ZooMoo	Flash
Lucas the Spider (shorts)	2	32	United States	2017–21	YouTube	CGI
Lumi & Bo		17	Germany	2017	Nick	CGI
The Magic Canoe	5	65	Canada	2017–21	Unis TV; APTN	Flash
The Magic School Bus Rides Again	3	30	United States; Canada	2017–21	Netflix	Flash
Magiki	1	52	France; Italy	2017–18	DeA Junior; TiJi	Flash
Marvel Super Hero Adventures	4	40	United States	2017–20	Disney Channel; Disney Junior; YouTube; DisneyNow	Flash
Massive Monster Mayhem	1	22	Canada	2017–18	Family Channel	CGI/Live action
MaXi	1	26	Canada	2017	TFO	Flash
Memories of Nanette	1	52	France	2017	M6	Flash
Mickey Mouse Mixed-Up Adventures	3	87	United States	2017–21	Disney Jr.	CGI
Mike Judge Presents: Tales from the Tour Bus	2	16	United States	2017–18	Cinemax	Traditional
Mini Beat Power Rockers	4	212	Argentina	2017–present	Discovery Kids	CGI
Monchhichi Tribe	2		France; Japan	2017	TFOU	CGI
Monkart	1	52	South Korea	2017–18	EBS1	CGI
Monster High: Adventures of the Ghoul Squad	1	14	United States	2017–18	YouTube	CGI
Mr. Monkey, Monkey Mechanic	2	29	Canada	2017–present	YouTube	Flash
Mundo Ripilica	2	26	Brazil	2017	Discovery Kids	CGI
Muttis Kampf	1	25	Germany	2017	Tele 5	
My Cultivator Girlfriend	1	15	China	2017–18	Tencent Video	Traditional
My Little Pony: Equestria Girls	1	3	United States; Canada	2017	Discovery Family	Flash
My Little Pony: Equestria Girls (webisodes)	2	70	United States; Canada	2017–20	Discovery Family; YouTube	Flash
My Love BBoguri	1	26	South Korea	2017–18	MBC TV	
Mysticons	2	40	Canada; United States	2017–18	Nickelodeon (2017); Nicktoons (2018); YTV	Toon Boom Harmony
Naughty Nuts	1	26	South Korea	2017	EBS1	Flash
Nella the Princess Knight	2	68	United States	2017–21	Nickelodeon (2017); Nick Jr. (2018–19); Paramount+ (2021)	Flash/Toon Boom
Neo Yokio	1	6	United States; Japan	2017	Netflix	
Neobot Master	1	52	South Korea	2017–19	KBS2	CGI
Niko and the Sword of Light	2	23	United States	2017–19	Amazon Prime Video	Flash
Nils Holgersson	1	52	France	2017		CGI
Nori: Roller Coaster Boy	2	52	South Korea	2017–18	KBS2	CGI
Numberblocks	9	180	United Kingdom	2017–present	CBeebies	CGI
OK K.O.! Let's Be Heroes	3	112	United States	2017–19	Cartoon Network	Traditional
The Ollie & Moon Show	2	52	Canada; France; United States; United Kingdom	2017–21	France 4 France 5 Okoo; TVOKids; Universal Kids/Netflix/HBO Max	Flash; Live action
Ollie! The Boy Who Became What He Ate	2	26	Canada	2017–19	CBC Kids	Flash
Olobob Top	2	78	United Kingdom	2017–19	CBeebies; S4C	Flash
Omar & Hana	5	117	Malaysia	2017–21	Astro Ceria	CGI
Oswaldo	4	52	Brazil; India (seasons 2–4)	2017–21	Cartoon Network; TV Cultura; Disney Channel	Flash
Paap-O-Meter	6	173	India; Canada	2017–20	Sony YAY! YTV	Flash
Pablo	2	105	United Kingdom; Ireland (episodes only)	2017–20	CBeebies; RTÉjr	Flash
Papaya Bull	1	13	Brazil	2017–18	Nickelodeon Brazil	Flash
Paprika	2	78	France	2017–19	France 5	Flash
Pat the Dog	2	145	France; Italy; Belgium (season 1)	2017–22	Télétoon+ Canal+ Family; Rai Gulp; La Trois; OUFtivi; Ketnet (season 1)	CGI
Pete the Cat	2	41	United States	2017–22	Amazon Prime Video	Flash
Petualangan Si Unyil			Indonesia	2017–present	Usee Prime (2017); Trans7 (2018); RTV (2023)	CGI
The Pirates Next Door	1	52	France	2017	France 3	CGI
Planetorama	1	13	Brazil	2017–18	TV Cultura	Flash
Prince Jai aur Dumdaar Viru			India	2017–19	Sony YAY!	
Puppy Dog Pals	5	116	United States	2017–23	Disney Junior	CGI
Rapunzel's Tangled Adventure	3	60	United States	2017–20	Disney Channel	Toon Boom Harmony
Rocket & Groot	1	12	United States	2017	Disney XD	CGI
The Ruff Ruffman Show	1	20	United States	2017	PBSKids.org; YouTube	Flash/Live action
Running Man Animation	2	97	South Korea	2017–20	SBS TV	CGI
Ryan Defrates: Secret Agent	1	12	United States	2017		Flash
Sab Jholmaal Hai	4	52	India	2017–18	Sony YAY!	Flash
School of Roars	2	104	United Kingdom	2017–21	CBeebies	Flash
Selfie with Bajrangi			India	2017	Amazon Prime Video; Disney+ Hotstar	
Shadowstone Park	1	3	United States	2017	VRV	Flash
Sheikh Chilli & Friendz			India	2017	Discovery Kids	CGI
Sherazade: The Untold Stories	1	26	Australia; Germany; India	2017	Network Ten	CGI
Shining Star	1	52	China; South Korea	2017–18	MBC TV	CGI
Les Sisters	2	104	France	2017–present	M6	Flash
Slow Slow Sloth Neul	2	21	South Korea	2017–21	KBS2	CGI
Smighties	1	39	United States	2017	YouTube	
Society of Virtue	3	82+	Brazil	2017–present	YouTube	
Die Sorgenfresser	1	14	Germany	2017	Nick	CGI
Spider-Man (2017)	3	58	United States	2017–20	Disney XD	Traditional
Spirit Riding Free	12	78	United States	2017–20	Netflix	CGI
Star Wars Forces of Destiny	2	32	United States	2017–18	YouTube	Flash
Stitch & Ai	1	13	China	2017	CCTV-1; CCTV-14	Flash; Traditional (3 episodes)
Stone Age: The Legendary Pet	2	26	South Korea	2017–18	KBS2	CGI
Story Messenger Dongaebi	1	12	South Korea	2017	SBS	
Stretch Armstrong and the Flex Fighters	2	23	United States	2017–18	Netflix	Traditional
Sunny Day	2	60	United Kingdom; Canada	2017–20	Nickelodeon (2017–18); Nick Jr. (2018–19); Amazon Prime Video (2020)	Flash
Super Bheem			India	2017	Pogo	CGI
Super BOOMi	1	52	China	2017	Tencent Video	CGI
Super Monsters	3	22	United States; Canada; United Kingdom	2017–21	Netflix	CGI
T-Buster	2	46	South Korea	2017–19	KBS1; KBS2	CGI
Tākaro Tribe	5	105	New Zealand	2017–present	TVNZ	Flash
Tales of Demons and Gods	6	328	China	2017–present	Tencent Video; Bilibili iQIYI; Mango TV	CGI
Tales of Exorcism	1	15	China	2017	Tencent Video; Bilibili iQIYI; Mango TV; PPTV; Sohu Video	
Tarantula	1	10	United States	2017	TBS	Traditional
Tarzan and Jane	2	13	United States	2017–18	Netflix	CGI
Tender Touches	3	15	United States	2017–20	Adult Swim	Traditional
Through the Woods	1	10	United States	2017	Curious World	Flash
Tik Tak Tail	5	118	India	2017–19	Pogo	Flash
Tin & Tan	1	52	Colombia; Spain	2017	Señal Colombia	CGI
Tommy the Little Dragon	3	68	Russia	2017–present	Carousel	Flash
Too Loud!	2	16	United States	2017–19	YouTube	Flash/Traditional
ToonMarty	1	20	Canada	2017	Teletoon	Flash
Top Wing	2	52	Canada	2017–20	Treehouse TV	CGI
Tordesilhas	1	26	Brazil	2017	TV Cultura	
Toy Cop	2	52	South Korea	2017–18	KBS2	CGI
Transformers: Titans Return	1	10	United States	2017–18	go90	CGI
True and the Rainbow Kingdom	3	29	United States; Canada	2017–19	Netflix (Worldwide); CBC Television	CGI
Trulli Tales	2	104	Italy; France; United Kingdom; Canada; Brazil	2017–23	Rai Yoyo; Disney Junior; Télétoon+ Tiny Pop; Ici Radio-Canada Télé; Knowledge Network; Gloobinho	Flash
TukTakMan	4	108	South Korea	2017–22	EBS1; MBC TV	CGI
Tutu	1	52	Cuba; Spain	2017	Clan	CGI
Unikitty!	3	104	United States	2017–20	Cartoon Network	Flash
Vampirina	3	75	United States; Ireland	2017–21	Disney Junior; Disney Channel	CGI
VeggieTales in the City	2	26	United States	2017	Netflix	CGI
Vivi Viravento	1	26	Brazil	2017	Discovery Kids	Flash
Wacky Races (2017)	2	78	United States	2017–19	Boomerang	Traditional
Wandering Wenda	1	26	Canada	2017	CBC Kids	Flash
We're Lalaloopsy	1	13	United States	2017	Netflix	Flash
Welcome to the Wayne	2	30	United States; Canada	2017–19	Nickelodeon (2017); Nicktoons (2018–19)	Flash
When I Worry About Things	1	5	United Kingdom	2017		
Wishfart	1	20	Canada	2017–18	Teletoon	Flash
The Wolo Family: Save the Elf	2	104	China	2017–19	Tencent Video	
Woodventures	1	104	Russia	2017–19	Tlum HD; Moolt	CGI
Yakka Dee!	3	60	United Kingdom	2017–present	CBeebies	Flash/Live action
Yo Yo	2	104	Italy	2017	Rai Yoyo	CGI
Yom	1	26	India	2017	Disney Channel India	Flash
ZellyGo	5	143	South Korea	2017–20	KBS2; JEI Talent TV; Cartoon Network	CGI
Zumbini Time		20	United States	2017	BabyFirst	Flash/Live action

== See also ==
- 2017 in animation
- 2017 in anime
- List of animated feature films of 2017
