= 2017 in animation =

2017 in animation is an overview of notable events, including notable awards, list of films released, television show debuts and endings, and notable deaths.

== Events ==
=== January ===
- January 9: Little Witch Academia premieres on Tokyo MX and Netflix; it went on to receive mostly positive responses from critics and audiences for its vibrant animation, charming characters, and magical storytelling, establishing itself as one of the best anime series of 2017 and the 2010s. (Note: Attributed to multiple sources:)
- January 14: Paw Patrol concludes its third season on TVO in Canada with the episodes "Pups Save Their Floating Friends/Pups Save a Satellite". Season later concluded on Nickelodeon on January 26.
- January 15: Your Name becomes the highest grossing anime film, grossing nearly $300 million.
- January 16:
  - PBS Kids Channel launches and became available on many PBS member stations as a digital subchannel (particularly those that in the past, PBS had routinely supplied content for their independently programmed, kid-targeted subchannels) and through apps and streaming services, features a broad mix of the public television service's current inventory of children's programming.
  - The final episode of Regular Show airs on Cartoon Network.
- January 23: As a result for Alphablocks. Numberblocks premieres on CBeebies for the first time at 10:20.
- January 30: Cartoon Network greenlights a new upcoming series for its line-up titled "Summer Camp Island".
- January 31: The Scooby-Doo direct-to-video film Scooby-Doo! Shaggy's Showdown releases on digital services; later released on DVD on February 14.

=== February ===
- February 2: Adventure Time concludes its eighth season on Cartoon Network with the final part in the Islands miniseries "Islands Part 8: The Light Cloud".
- February 3: Clarence concludes its second season on Cartoon Network with the episode "Pizza Hero".
- February 4: 44th Annie Awards.
- February 6: Season 4 of Paw Patrol begins on Nickelodeon in the US with the premiere of the episodes "Pups Save a Blimp/Pups Save the Chili Cook-Off". Season later premiered on TVO in Canada on March 4.
- February 10:
  - Chris McKay's The Lego Batman Movie, produced by Warner Animation Group, is released theatrically in the U.S., to widespread acclaim from critics and audiences for its animation, voice acting, music, visual style, characters, and humor.
  - The third & final season of Clarence begins on Cartoon Network with the premiere of the episodes "Sumo Goes West" and "Valentimes".
  - Series 1 ends for Numberblocks.
- February 19: The Simpsons episode "The Cad and the Hat" premieres, guest starring Seth Green.
- February 20: SpongeBob SquarePants concludes its ninth season on Nickelodeon with the premiere of its 200th episode "Goodbye, Krabby Patty?", Jon Hamm guest stars as the character Don Grouper. The season's finale was seen by over 2.6 million viewers that night.
- February 26: 89th Academy Awards:
  - Piper by Alan Barillaro and Marc Sondheimer wins the Academy Award for Best Animated Short Film.
  - Zootopia by Byron Howard, Rich Moore, and Clark Spencer wins the Academy Award for Best Animated Feature.
- February 27: Star vs. the Forces of Evil concludes its second season on Disney XD with the episodes "Face the Music/Starcrushed".

=== March ===
- March 9: Cartoon Network greenlights another new upcoming series for its line-up titled "OK K.O.! Let's Be Heroes", which is based on Ian Jones-Quartey's Lakewood Plaza Turbo short (and its recent mini web series based on it). An upcoming tie-in game based on the series was also announced.
- March 12: The Simpsons episode "22 for 30" airs, in which the couch gag is animated by Bill Plympton, the fifth time he has done so.
- March 30: Cartoon Network greenlights two more upcoming shows for its line-up, them being "Apple & Onion" and "Craig of the Creek".
- March 31: Tom McGrath's The Boss Baby, produced by DreamWorks Animation, is released in the United States by 20th Century Fox.

=== April ===
- April 1: Season 3 of Rick and Morty begins on Adult Swim with the premiere of the episode "The Rickshank Rickdemption". The season's premiere was only seen by 676 thousand viewers that night due to it secretly premiering as an April Fools' Day joke.
- April 2: The Simpsons episode "The Caper Chase" premieres, guest starring scientist Neil deGrasse Tyson.
- April 7: Kelly Asbury's Smurfs: The Lost Village, produced by Sony Pictures Animation as a computer-animated reboot of the live-action animated Smurfs films, is released in theaters.
- April 21:
  - PBS Kids launched "PBS Kids Family Night," a weekly block on Friday evenings (with encore airings on Saturday and Sunday evenings) that showcase themed programming, premieres or special "movie-length" episodes of new and existing PBS Kids children's programs.
  - Season 9 of Adventure Time begins on Cartoon Network with the premiere of the episode "Orb".

=== May ===
- May 1: The second series of Numberblocks begins.
- May 11: Steven Universe concludes its fourth season on Cartoon Network with the two-part episodes "Are You My Dad?/I Am My Mom". The season's finale was seen by over 1.1 million viewers that night.
- May 19: The second series ends for Numberblocks.
- May 21:
  - The Simpsons concludes its 28th season on Fox with the episode "Dogtown", guest starring english actor Michael York. The season's finale was seen by over 2.1 million viewers that night.
  - Family Guy concludes its 15th season on Fox with the following episodes:
    - "Dearly Deported"
    - "A House Full of Peters"
      - Both episodes were seen by over 2.1 million viewers that night.
- May 24: Luke Lerdwichagul, creator of the machinima YouTube series SMG4 since May 2011, announces the creation of his company "Glitchy Boy" (which became Glitch Productions the following year).
- May 29: The fifth & final season of Steven Universe begins on Cartoon Network with the premiere of a 4-episode'd event titled "Wanted".
- May 30: Season 2 of F Is for Family premieres on Netflix.

=== June ===
- June 2: David Soren's Captain Underpants: The First Epic Movie, produced by DreamWorks Animation as the animation studio's final film to be distributed by 20th Century Fox, is released in theaters.
- June 11: Bob's Burgers concludes its seventh season on Fox with the episode "Into the Mild", guest starring United States Marine actor Rob Riggle. The season's finale was seen by over 1.5 million viewers that night.
- June 15: The Loud House episode "L Is for Love" premieres on Nickelodeon, it is revealed that the character Luna Loud is Bisexual and has a crush on a girl.
- June 16: The Walt Disney Company/Pixar film Cars 3 is released. The second sequel to the 2006 Pixar film draws closer to the original Cars film (due to negative reception from the previous sequel) and dedicates the tribute to Paul Newman’s final character Doc Hudson.
- June 24: Season 11 of SpongeBob SquarePants begins on Nickelodeon (despite still being in its tenth season) with the premiere of the episodes "Spot Returns/The Check-Up". The season's premiere was seen by over 1.9 million viewers that morning.
- June 27: The direct-to-video Tom and Jerry film, Willy Wonka and the Chocolate Factory, is released, which marks the latest film in the franchise to be directed by Spike Brandt and the last to be involved with Warner Bros. Animation's founder Hal Geer. The film was brutally panned by critics upon its release.

=== July ===
- July 7: Made in Abyss premieres on AT-X, Tokyo MX, and other channels; it went on to receive overarching acclaim from critics and audiences alike for its world-building, dark narrative, visuals, and musical score, eventually becoming widely regarded as one of the best anime series of 2017, the 2010s, and of all time. (Note: Attributed to multiple sources:)
- July 15: Season 3 of Star vs. the Forces of Evil begins on Disney XD with the premiere of the TV-movie "The Battle for Mewni".
- July 21:
  - The upcoming Disney XD series Country Club was announced to be renamed to as Big City Greens.
  - Adventure Time concludes its ninth season on Cartoon Network with the episode "Three Buckets".
- July 28: Tony Leondis' The Emoji Movie, produced by Sony Pictures Animation, is released. It grossed more than $217 million, but was widely panned by critics and audiences for its poor script, product placement, and lack of originality and plot, and was named by several major outlets as one of the worst films of 2017 and one of the worst animated films ever made.

=== August ===
- August 1: OK K.O.! Let's Be Heroes premieres on Cartoon Network.
- August 12: DuckTales, a reboot of the original 1987 series premieres on Disney XD.
- August 19: The first episode of Michael Pitts' independent webseries Sheriff Hayseed, titled "Strategically Stupid", is released on YouTube.

=== September ===
- September 8: Season 4 of BoJack Horseman premieres on Netflix.
- September 9: Sprout rebrands to Universal Kids which caters to children aged 2–11 in primetime, and features content from NBCU-owned DreamWorks Animation as well as child-specific reality TV shows. However, Sprout's preschool-specific programming will remain a major part of the schedule, as a programming block airing from 3:00 a.m. to 6:00 p.m..
- September 11: American Dad! concludes its 14th season on TBS with the episode "West to Mexico". The season's finale was watched by only 868 thousand viewers that night, marking a new low for the show's viewership.
- September 13: Season 21 of South Park begins on Comedy Central with the premiere of the episode "White People Renovating Houses".
- September 17: The tenth & final season of Adventure Time begins on Cartoon Network with the premiere of the following episodes:
  - "The Wild Hunt"
  - "Always BMO Closing"
  - "Son of Rap Bear"
  - "Bonnibel Bubblegum"
- September 22: The Lego Ninjago Movie, directed by Charlie Bean, Paul Fisher, and Bob Logan and produced by Warner Animation Group, is released in the U.S., becoming both a critical and commercial disappointment.
- September 29: Big Mouth premieres on Netflix.

=== October ===
- October 1:
  - Season 8 of Bob's Burgers begins on Fox with the premiere of the episode "Brunchsquatch". The season's premiere was seen by over 2.9 million viewers that night.
  - Season 29 of The Simpsons begins on Fox with the premiere of the episode "The Serfsons", guest starring European actors Billy Boyd and Nikolaj Coster-Waldau. The season's premiere was seen by over 3.2 million viewers that night
  - Season 16 of Family Guy begins on Fox with the premiere of the episode "Emmy-Winning Episode", guest starring the following actors: Julie Bowen, Louis C.K., Frances Callier (playing Shonda Rhimes), Jonathan Kite (playing Alec Baldwin), Bill Maher, Sofía Vergara, Miriam Margolyes, Christina Pickles, Asa Akira & Ty Burrell (in live-action). The season's premiere was seen by exactly 2.8 million that night.
  - Rick and Morty concludes its third season on Adult Swim with the episode "The Rickchurian Mortydate". The season's finale was seen by exactly 2.6 million viewers that night.
- October 6: My Little Pony: The Movie, a film based on My Little Pony: Friendship is Magic, is released in theaters.
- October 7: Land of the Lustrous premieres on AT-X and other TV channels in Japan; it went on to receive widespread acclaim from critics and audiences alike for its visual style, storytelling, and innovative use of 3D CGI, becoming a groundbreaking turning point for CG anime and widely regarded as one of the best anime series of 2017, the 2010s, and of all time. (Note: Attributed to multiple sources:)
- October 8: Harvey Weinstein, the co-founder of Miramax and The Weinstein Company, got arrested for sexual assault. He is discharged from both companies, which one was closed down by bankruptcy the following year. Due to this, Lantern Entertainment retained most rights of the films produced by The Weinstein Company. Some of his edited works, including the notorious versions of The Thief and the Cobbler and Arthur and the Minimoys, are yet to be renewed.
- October 17: The Loud House creator Chris Savino is fired by Nickelodeon due to allegations of sexual harassment.
- October 27: The first episode of the upcoming Lego Movie spin-off Unikitty! airs on Cartoon Network as a sneak peek.
- October 30: Two Balloons, a stop-motion animated short film written and directed by Mark Smith is released.

=== November ===
- November 10: The Amazing World of Gumball concludes its fifth season on Cartoon Network with the episode "The News". The season's finale was seen by only 913 thousand viewers that night.
- November 17:
  - Teen Titans Go!'s 200th episode "Thanksgetting" premieres on Cartoon Network.
    - Despite this being the show's 200th episode, the two-part special "The Self-Indulgent 200th Episode Spectacular!" (which premiered the following week) was dedicated to the show reaching 200 episodes.
  - The second Unikitty! episode "Sparkle Matter Matters" premieres on Cartoon Network as another sneak peek.
- November 22: Disney releases Coco by Pixar.

=== December ===
- December 1:
  - The third Unikitty! episode "No Day Like Snow Day" premieres on Cartoon Network as the final sneak preview of the show, the series would make its official premiere next month.
  - The Loud House concludes its second season on Nickelodeon with the episodes "Snow Way Out/Snow Way Down". The season's finale was seen by over 1.7 million viewers that night.
- December 2:
  - Milo Murphy's Law concludes its first season on Disney XD with the Christmas special "A Christmas Peril".
  - SpongeBob SquarePants concludes its tenth season on Nickelodeon with the episode "The Incredible Shrinking Sponge". The season's finale was seen by over 1.8 million viewers that morning.
- December 6: South Park concludes its 21st season on Comedy Central with the episode "Splatty Tomato". The episode was only seen by 97 hundred thousand viewers that night, marking a new low for the show's viewership.
- December 13: Dumbo and The Sinking of the Lusitania are added to the National Film Registry.
- December 15: Blue Sky Studios releases Ferdinand, directed by Carlos Saldanha.
- December 25: Season 15 of American Dad! begins on TBS with the premiere of the Holiday special "Santa, Schmanta". The season's premiere was watched by only 863 thousand viewers that night, marking another new low for the show's viewership.

== Awards ==
- Academy Award for Best Animated Feature: Zootopia
- Academy Award for Best Animated Short Film: Piper
- American Cinema Editors Award for Best Edited Animated Feature Film: Zootopia
- Annecy International Animated Film Festival Cristal du long métrage: Lu over the Wall
- Annie Award for Best Animated Feature: Coco
- Annie Award for Best Animated Feature—Independent: The Breadwinner
- Asia Pacific Screen Award for Best Animated Feature Film: Window Horses: The Poetic Persian Epiphany of Rosie Ming
- BAFTA Award for Best Animated Film: Coco
- César Award for Best Animated Film: The Big Bad Fox and Other Tales...
- Chicago Film Critics Association Award for Best Animated Film: Coco
- Critics' Choice Movie Award for Best Animated Feature: Coco
- Dallas–Fort Worth Film Critics Association Award for Best Animated Film: Coco
- European Film Award for Best Animated Film: Loving Vincent
- Florida Film Critics Circle Award for Best Animated Film: Coco
- Golden Globe Award for Best Animated Feature Film: Coco
- Golden Reel Award for Animated Feature Film: Coco
- Goya Award for Best Animated Film: Tad Jones: The Hero Returns
- Hollywood Animation Award: Coco
- Japan Academy Prize for Animation of the Year: In This Corner of the World
- Japan Media Arts Festival Animation Grand Prize: In This Corner of the World and Lu over the Wall
- Kids' Choice Award for Favorite Animated Movie: Coco
- Los Angeles Film Critics Association Award for Best Animated Film: The Breadwinner
- Mainichi Film Awards - Animation Grand Award: Complex × Complex
- National Board of Review Award for Best Animated Film: Coco
- New York Film Critics Circle Award for Best Animated Film: Coco
- Online Film Critics Society Award for Best Animated Film: Coco
- Producers Guild of America Award for Best Animated Motion Picture: Coco
- San Diego Film Critics Society Award for Best Animated Film: My Life as a Zucchini
- San Francisco Film Critics Circle Award for Best Animated Feature: Coco
- Satellite Award for Best Animated or Mixed Media Feature: Coco
- Saturn Award for Best Animated Film: Coco
- St. Louis Gateway Film Critics Association Award for Best Animated Film: Coco
- Tokyo Anime Award: A Silent Voice and Yuri!!! on Ice
- Toronto Film Critics Association Award for Best Animated Film: The Breadwinner
- Visual Effects Society Award for Outstanding Visual Effects in an Animated Feature: Coco
- Washington D.C. Area Film Critics Association Award for Best Animated Feature: Coco

== Television series debuts ==
| Date | Title | Channel | Year |
|---|---|---|---|
| January 7 | Tarzan and Jane | Netflix | 2017–2018 |
| January 9 | Little Witch Academia | Netflix | 2017 |
| January 10 | We're Lalaloopsy | Netflix | 2017 |
| January 10 | Kemono Friends | TV Tokyo | 2017–2019 |
| January 11 | Jeff & Some Aliens | Comedy Central | 2017 |
| January 12 | Hanazuki: Full of Treasures | YouTube | 2017–2019 |
| January 12 | Miss Kobayashi's Dragon Maid | Tokyo MX | 2017–2021 |
| January 15 | Mickey Mouse Mixed-Up Adventures | Disney Junior | 2017–2021 |
| January 16 | Bunsen Is a Beast | Nickelodeon | 2017–2018 |
| January 23 | Numberblocks | BBC iPlayer, Cbeebies | 2017–present |
| February 6 | Nella the Princess Knight | Nick Jr. | 2017–2021 |
| February 6 | School of Roars | Universal Kids | 2017–present |
| February 20 | Cloudy with a Chance of Meatballs | Cartoon Network | 2017–2018 |
| February 24 | VeggieTales in the City | Netflix | 2017 |
| February 24 | Legend Quest | Netflix | 2017–2019 |
| March 10 | Buddy Thunderstruck | Netflix | 2017 |
| March 11 | Samurai Jack | Adult Swim | 2017 |
| March 24 | Tangled: The Series | Disney Channel | 2017–2020 |
| March 27 | Stitch & Ai | CCTV-1, CCTV-14 | 2017 |
| March 29 | Imaginary Mary | ABC | 2017 |
| April 3 | Grizzy and the Lemmings | Boomerang | 2017–2019 |
| April 10 | Ben 10 (2016) | Cartoon Network | 2017–2021 |
| April 14 | Puppy Dog Pals | Disney Junior | 2017–2023 |
| May 5 | Spirit Riding Free | Netflix | 2017–2020 |
| May 12 | Pokémon the Series: Sun & Moon | Disney XD | 2017 |
| May 27 | The Ollie & Moon Show | Universal Kids | 2017–present |
| June 3 | Billy Dilley's Super-Duper Subterranean Summer | Disney XD | 2017 |
| June 3 | Pat the Dog | Disney Channel | 2017–present |
| June 25 | Hotel Transylvania: The Series | Disney Channel | 2017–2020 |
| June 29 | Dorothy and the Wizard of Oz | Boomerang | 2017–2020 |
| June 30 | Danger & Eggs | Amazon Video | 2017 |
| July 7 | Castlevania | Netflix | 2017–2021 |
| July 7 | Made in Abyss | AT-X, Toonami | 2017–2022 |
| July 9 | Too Loud! | YouTube | 2017–2019 |
| July 15 | Kody Kapow | Universal Kids | 2017–present |
| July 20 | Niko and the Sword of Light | Amazon Video | 2017–2019 |
| July 24 | Welcome to the Wayne | Nickelodeon | 2017–2019 |
| August 1 | OK K.O.! Let's Be Heroes | Cartoon Network | 2017–2019 |
| August 11 | True and the Rainbow Kingdom | Netflix | 2017–2019 |
| August 12 | DuckTales (2017) | Disney XD, Disney Channel | 2017–2021 |
| August 19 | Sheriff Hayseed | YouTube | 2017–2019 |
| August 19 | Spider-Man (2017) | Disney XD | 2017–2020 |
| August 21 | Sunny Day | Nick Jr. | 2017–2020 |
| August 28 | Mysticons | Nickelodeon | 2017–2018 |
| September 22 | Neo Yokio | Netflix | 2017–2018 |
| September 22 | Mike Judge Presents: Tales from the Tour Bus | Cinemax | 2017–2018 |
| September 29 | The Magic School Bus Rides Again | Netflix | 2017–2018 |
| September 29 | Big Mouth | Netflix | 2017–2025 |
| October 1 | Vampirina | Disney Junior | 2017–2021 |
| October 6 | Girls' Last Tour | AT-X | 2017 |
| October 7 | Land of the Lustrous | AT-X | 2017 |
| October 7 | The Ancient Magus' Bride | AT-X, Tokyo MX, MBS, BS11 | 2017–2023 |
| October 13 | Super Monsters | Netflix | 2017–2019 |
| October 22 | The Jellies! | Adult Swim | 2017–2019 |
| October 27 | Unikitty! (Note: The first 3 episodes aired only as a sneak preview, the show officially premiered on January 1, 2018.) | Cartoon Network | 2017–2020 |
| November 6 | Top Wing | Nickelodeon | 2017–2020 |
| November 7 | If You Give a Mouse a Cookie | Amazon Prime Video | 2017–2021 |
| November 17 | Stretch Armstrong and the Flex Fighters | Netflix | 2017–2018 |
| November 20 | Big Hero 6: The Series | Disney XD, Disney Channel | 2017–2021 |
| December 6 | Happy! | Syfy | 2017–2019 |
| December 19 | Tender Touches | Adult Swim | 2017–2020 |

== Television series endings ==
| Date | Title | Channel | Year | Notes |
|---|---|---|---|---|
| January 7 | Ultimate Spider-Man | Disney XD | 2012–2017 | Ended |
| January 10 | We're Lalaloopsy | Netflix | 2017 | Ended |
| January 11 | Secret Millionaires Club | Qubo | 2011–2017 | Ended |
| January 16 | Regular Show | Cartoon Network | 2010–2017 | Ended |
| January 28 | Pokémon the Series: XYZ | Cartoon Network | 2016–2017 | Ended |
| January 30 | Counterfeit Cat | Disney XD | 2016–2017 | Ended |
| February 5 | Dora and Friends: Into the City! | Nick Jr. | 2014-2017 | Ended |
| February 13 | Sheriff Callie's Wild West | Disney Junior | 2014-2017 | Ended |
| February 21 | Atomic Puppet | Disney XD | 2016–2017 | Ended |
| March 3 | Descendants: Wicked World | Disney Channel | 2015–2017 | Ended |
| March 10 | Buddy Thunderstruck | Netflix | 2017 | Ended |
| March 15 | Jeff & Some Aliens | Comedy Central | 2017 | Ended |
| March 21 | Fangbone! | Disney XD | 2016–2017 | Ended |
| March 24 | Bottersnikes and Gumbles | Netflix | 2016–2017 | Ended |
| April 6 | Stitch & Ai | CCTV-1, CCTV-14 | 2017 | Ended |
| April 21 | The Mr. Peabody & Sherman Show | Netflix | 2015–2017 | Ended |
| May 5 | Kazoops! | Netflix | 2016–2017 | Ended |
| May 20 | Samurai Jack | Adult Swim | 2017 | |
| May 30 | Imaginary Mary | ABC | 2017 | Cancelled |
| May 31 | Right Now Kapow | Disney XD | 2016–2017 | Cancelled |
| June 15 | Billy Dilley's Super-Duper Subterranean Summer | Disney XD | 2017 | Cancelled |
| June 16 | World of Winx | Netflix | 2016–2017 | Cancelled |
| June 30 | Uncle Grandpa | Cartoon Network | 2013–2017 | Ended |
| June 30 | Danger & Eggs | Amazon Video | 2017 | Ended |
| July 7 | Dawn of the Croods | Netflix | 2015–2017 | Ended |
| July 26 | The Fairly OddParents | Nickelodeon, Nicktoons | 2001–2017 | Ended |
| July 28 | Penn Zero: Part-Time Hero | Disney XD | 2014–2017 | Ended |
| August 20 | Legends of Chamberlain Heights | Comedy Central | 2016–2017 | Ended |
| August 24 | The ZhuZhus | Disney Channel | 2016–2017 | Ended |
| September 1 | Nexo Knights | Cartoon Network | 2015–2017 | Ended |
| September 4 | Two More Eggs | Disney XD | 2015–2017 | Ended |
| September 9 | Blazing Team: Masters of Yo Kwon Do | Discovery Family | 2015–2017 | Ended |
| September 15 | VeggieTales in the City | Netflix | 2017 | Ended |
| September 16 | Wallykazam! | Nick Jr. | 2014–2017 | Ended |
| November 18 | Sonic Boom | Cartoon Network | 2014–2017 | Ended |
| November 11 | Transformers: Robots in Disguise | Cartoon Network | 2015–2017 | Ended |
| November 12 | Teenage Mutant Ninja Turtles | Nickelodeon | 2012–2017 | Ended |
| December 1 | All Hail King Julien | Netflix | 2014–2017 | Ended |
| December 9 | Pokémon the Series: Sun & Moon | Disney XD | 2017 | Ended |
| December 29 | Harvey Beaks | Nicktoons | 2015–2017 | Ended |

== Television season premieres ==
| Date | Title | Season | Channel |
|---|---|---|---|
| February 6 | Paw Patrol | 4 | Nickelodeon (Note: Season later premiered in Canada on TVO on March 4th.) |
| February 10 | Clarence | 3 | Cartoon Network |
| March 3 | The Powerpuff Girls (2016) | 2 | Cartoon Network |
| April 1 | Rick and Morty | 3 | Adult Swim (Cartoon Network) |
| April 3 | We Bare Bears | 3 | Cartoon Network |
| April 21 | Adventure Time | 9 | Cartoon Network |
| May 1 | Numberblocks | 2 | BBC iPlayer, Cbeebies |
| May 29 | Steven Universe | 5 | Cartoon Network |
| May 30 | F Is for Family | 2 | Netflix |
| June 24 | SpongeBob SquarePants | 11 | Nickelodeon |
| July 15 | Star vs. the Forces of Evil | 3 | Disney XD |
| September 8 | BoJack Horseman | 4 | Netflix |
| September 13 | South Park | 21 | Comedy Central |
| September 17 | Adventure Time | 10 | Cartoon Network |
| October 1 | Bob's Burgers | 8 | Fox |
| October 1 | Family Guy | 16 | Fox |
| October 1 | The Simpsons | 29 | Fox |
| December 25 | American Dad! | 15 | TBS |

== Television season finales ==
| Date | Title | Season | Channel |
|---|---|---|---|
| January 14 | Paw Patrol | 3 | TVO (Note: Season later concluded in the US on Nickelodeon on January 26th.) |
| February 2 | Adventure Time | 8 | Cartoon Network |
| February 3 | Clarence | 2 | Cartoon Network |
| February 10 | Numberblocks | 1 | CBeebies, BBC iPlayer. |
| February 20 | SpongeBob SquarePants | 9 | Nickelodeon |
| February 27 | Star vs. the Forces of Evil | 2 | Disney XD |
| April 11 | We Bare Bears | 2 | Cartoon Network |
| May 11 | Steven Universe | 4 | Cartoon Network |
| May 19 | Numberblocks | 2 | CBeebies, BBC iPlayer. |
| May 21 | Family Guy | 15 | Fox |
| May 21 | The Simpsons | 28 | Fox |
| May 30 | F Is for Family | 2 | Netflix |
| June 11 | Bob's Burgers | 7 | Fox |
| July 21 | Adventure Time | 9 | Cartoon Network |
| September 8 | BoJack Horseman | 4 | Netflix |
| September 11 | American Dad! | 14 | TBS |
| September 29 | Big Mouth | 1 | Netflix |
| October 1 | Rick and Morty | 3 | Adult Swim (Cartoon Network) |
| November 10 | The Amazing World of Gumball | 5 | Cartoon Network |
| December 1 | The Loud House | 2 | Nickelodeon |
| December 2 | Milo Murphy's Law | 1 | Disney XD |
| December 2 | SpongeBob SquarePants | 10 | Nickelodeon |
| December 6 | South Park | 21 | Comedy Central |

== Births ==
=== June ===
- June 12: Scarlett Spears, American actress (voice of Bonnie Anderson in Toy Story 5).

== Deaths ==
=== January ===
- January 1: Alfonso Wong, Chinese comics artist and animator (Old Master Q), dies at age 93.
- January 10: Tony Rosato, Italian-Canadian actor and comedian (voice of Luigi in The Adventures of Super Mario Bros. 3 and Super Mario World, Orpheus and Young Nomad in Mythic Warriors, Duke in George and Martha, Quentin Eggert in Pelswick, Tom in the Monster by Mistake episode "Warren's Nightmare", Sherriff Ironsides in the Odd Job Jack episode "Odd Job John", Zane in the 6teen episode "Unhappy Anniversary", additional voices in The Busy World of Richard Scarry, Stickin' Around, The Adventures of Sam & Max: Freelance Police, Blaster's Universe, The Ripping Friends, Carl², Da Boom Crew and Detentionaire), dies from a heart attack at age 62.
- January 13: Dick Gautier, American actor, comedian, singer and caricaturist (voice of Rodimus Prime in The Transformers, Serpentor in G.I. Joe: A Real American Hero, Spike in Tom & Jerry Kids, Teddy Lupus in the Batman: The Animated Series episode "Feat of Clay"), dies at age 85.
- January 19: Miguel Ferrer, American actor (voice of Shan Yu in Mulan, Death in Adventure Time, Tarakudo in Jackie Chan Adventures, Vandal Savage in Young Justice, Deathstroke in Teen Titans: The Judas Contract, Martian Manhunter in Justice League: The New Frontier, Aquaman and Weather Wizard in Superman: The Animated Series, Agent Hopkins in the American Dad! episode "American Dream Factory", Magister Hulka in the Ben 10: Ultimate Alien episode "Basic Training"), dies from heart failure and complications of throat cancer at age 61.
- January 20: Sooan Kim, Korean-American animator (Teenage Mutant Ninja Turtles, Æon Flux, The Oblongs, The Simpsons), dies at age 62.
- January 25:
  - John Hurt, English actor (voice of Aragorn in The Lord of the Rings, Hazel in Watership Down, Snitter in The Plague Dogs, the Horned King in The Black Cauldron, Mr. Mole in Thumbelina, Narrator in The Tigger Movie, Felix in Valiant, Grandpa Sammy in A Turtle's Tale: Sammy's Adventures, Owl in The Gruffalo's Child, Sailor John in Thomas & Friends: Sodor's Legend of the Lost Treasure), dies at age 77.
  - Jack Mendelsohn, American writer-artist (Hanna-Barbera, Yellow Submarine, Teenage Mutant Ninja Turtles), dies at age 90.
- January 26: Hal Geer, American producer, film editor and animator (Warner Bros. Cartoons), dies at age 100.

=== February ===
- February 19: Chris Wiggins, English-born Canadian actor (voice of Thor in The Marvel Super Heroes, Mysterio in Spider-Man, Satan in The Devil and Daniel Mouse, Mr. Sun in the Strawberry Shortcake franchise, No Heart in The Care Bears Family, Great Wishing Star in Care Bears Movie II: A New Generation, the narrator in the first episode of the DIC dub of Sailor Moon, Cornelius in the Babar franchise), dies at age 86.
- February 22: Bill Woodson, American actor (narrator in Super Friends), dies at age 99.
- February 25: Bill Paxton, American actor and filmmaker (voice of Eddie Beck in Pixies), dies from a stroke at age 61.

=== March ===
- March 10: Tony Haygarth, English actor (voice of Mr. Tweedy in Chicken Run), dies at age 72.
- March 26: Joe Harris, American illustrator and storybook artist (creator of the Trix Rabbit, co-creator of Underdog), dies at age 89.

=== April ===
- April 6: Don Rickles, American comedian and actor (voice of Mr. Potato Head in the Toy Story franchise, Cornwall in Quest for Camelot), dies at age 90.
- April 9: Carolyn Kelly, American comics artist, animator and book designer (Channel Umptee-3), dies from cancer at an unknown age.
- April 11: Merle Welton, American animation checker (Pinocchio and the Emperor of the Night, Rugrats, Tom and Jerry: The Movie, The Simpsons, Dilbert) and continuity coordinator (Disney Television Animation), dies at an unknown age.
- April 13: Ralph Votrian, American actor (voice of Anaheim Electronics Chief in Mobile Suit Gundam 0083: Stardust Memory, Lord Zortek in Gatchaman, King Lexian in Mighty Morphin Power Rangers and Masked Rider, the Narrator in Reign: The Conqueror, Konishi in Kaze no Yojimbo, Sophocles in The Little Polar Bear, Old Galein Musica in Rave Master, the Narrator and Doctor in the As Told by Ginger episode "Gym Class Confidential", Jeff's Grandpa in the Zatch Bell! episode "Rumble in the Snow"), dies at age 82.

=== May ===
- May 13: John Cygan, American actor and comedian (voice of Hedley in Treasure Planet, Uncle Lope in Leo the Lion, Richard Kensington in Cars, Who in Horton Hears a Who!, Twitch in Toy Story 3, Male Radio Caller and Gus in Superman/Batman: Apocalypse, Abel North and Kane North in the Ben 10 episode "Super Alien Hero Buddy Adventures", TV Announcer and Man at Police Station in The Grim Adventures of Billy & Mandy episode "Bearded Billy", various characters in Regular Show, additional voices in Space Strikers, Titan A.E., Poochini, Ice Age: The Meltdown, Happily N'Ever After, Surf's Up, WALL-E, Cars Toons, Up, Cloudy with a Chance of Meatballs, The Lorax, Monsters University, Despicable Me 2, The Pirate Fairy, Inside Out, Minions and Despicable Me 3), dies from cancer at age 63.
- May 14:
  - Powers Boothe, American actor (voice of Gorilla Grodd in the DC Animated Universe, Sunder in Ben 10: Alien Force and Ben 10: Ultimate Alien, Dead Justice in the Scooby-Doo! Mystery Incorporated episode of the same name, Steve St. James in The Looney Tunes Show), dies at age 68.
  - Brad Grey, American producer (Sammy), dies from cancer at age 59.
- May 31: Tino Insana, American actor (voice of Mr. Grouper in Bubble Guppies, Uncle Ted in Bobby's World, Pig in Barnyard and Back at the Barnyard, and Bushroot in Darkwing Duck), dies at age 69.

=== June ===
- June 2: Peter Sallis, English actor (voice of Wallace in Wallace and Gromit and Rex the Runt, Rat in The Wind in the Willows, and the narrator of Rocky Hollow), dies at age 96.
- June 9: Adam West, American actor (voice of Batman in The New Adventures of Batman, Tarzan and the Super 7, Super Friends: The Legendary Super Powers Show, The Super Powers Team: Galactic Guardians, The Simpsons episode "Large Marge", Batman: New Times, Batman: Return of the Caped Crusaders and Batman vs. Two-Face, Dog Zero and Leonardo da Vinci in The Secret Files of the Spy Dogs, Mayor Adam West in Family Guy, Catman in The Fairly OddParents, Mayor Grange in The Batman, Jared Moon in Aloha, Scooby-Doo!, Ace in Chicken Little, Uncle Art in Meet the Robinsons, Thomas Wayne and Proto-Bot in Batman: The Brave and the Bold, Wise Old Parrot in Jake and the Never Land Pirates, Captain Super Captain and Professor Evil Professor in Penn Zero: Part-Time Hero, Simon Trent in the Batman: The Animated Series episode "Beware the Gray Ghost", Captain Blasto in the Rugrats episode "Superhero Chuckie", Spruce Wayne/Caped Crusader in the Animaniacs episode "Boo Wonder", Ernest Hemingway in the Histeria! episode "Super Writers", Timothy North/Fearless Ferret in the Kim Possible episode "The Fearless Ferret", R. Kelly's Lawyer in The Boondocks episode "The Trail of Robert Kelly", young Mermaid Man in the SpongeBob SquarePants episode "Back to the Past", Nighthawk in The Super Hero Squad Show episode "Whom Continuity Would Destroy!", Razzle Novak in the Moonbeam City episode "Stuntstravaganza", himself in The Simpsons episode "Mr. Plow", The Critic episode "Eyes on the Prize", the Johnny Bravo episodes "Johnny Bravo Meets Adam West" and "Adam West Date-O-Rama", The Fairly OddParents episodes "Miss Dimmsdale" and "Channel Chasers", and the Futurama episode "Leela and the Genestalk"), dies from leukemia at age 88.
- June 13: Jack Ong, American actor, writer, activist and marketing professional (voice of Chinese Fisherman in The Simpsons episode "Das Bus"), dies from a brain tumor at age 76.
- June 16: Stephen Furst, American actor (voice of Fanboy in Freakazoid!, Hathi in Jungle Cubs, Dash in The Little Mermaid II: Return to the Sea, Booster in Buzz Lightyear of Star Command, Male Warthog in the Timon & Pumbaa episode "Home Is Where the Hog Is", Sport in the Road Rovers episode "The Dog Who Knew Too Much"), dies from complications related to diabetes at age 63.
- June 27: Michael Bond, English author (Paddington Bear, The Herbs, The Adventures of Parsley), dies at age 91.

=== July ===
- July 6: Joan Boocock Lee, English-American model, actress, and wife of Stan Lee (voice of Madame Web in Spider-Man, Miss Forbes in Fantastic Four), dies at age 95.
- July 9: Wally Burr, American actor (voice of Atom in The All-New Super Friends Hour), and director (The Transformers, G.I. Joe: A Real American Hero, Jem, Inspector Gadget, Spider-Man), dies at age 93.
- July 15: Martin Landau, American actor, acting coach, producer and editorial cartoonist (voice of Mac Gargan/Scorpion in Spider-Man, #2 in 9, Mr. Rzykruski in Frankenweenie, The Great Raymondo in The Simpsons episode "The Great Simpsina"), dies from hypovolemic shock at age 89.
- July 18: Harvey Atkin, Canadian actor (voice of Alien/Henchman in Heavy Metal, King Koopa in The Super Mario Bros. Super Show!), dies at age 74.
- July 26:
  - June Foray, American actress (voice of Lucifer in Cinderella, Granny and Witch Hazel in Looney Tunes, Knothead and Splinter in Woody Woodpecker, Rocky the Flying Squirrel, Natasha Fatale and Nell Fenwick in Rocky and Bullwinkle, Jokey Smurf in The Smurfs, Grammi Gummi in Disney's Adventures of the Gummi Bears, Magica De Spell and Ma Beagle in DuckTales, Grandmother Fa in Mulan), dies at age 99.
  - Patti Deutsch, American actress and comedian (voice of Mata in The Emperor's New Groove franchise, Tantor's mother in Tarzan, Mrs. Dave in As Told by Ginger, Lucy-2 in Jetsons: The Movie), dies at age 73.

=== August ===
- August 8: Glen Campbell, American guitarist, singer, songwriter, actor and television host (voice of Chanticleer in Rock-a-Doodle), dies at age 81.
- August 10: Dell Hake, American conductor and orchestrator (The Powerpuff Girls Movie, The Simpsons), dies at age 73.
- August 13: Joseph Bologna, American actor (voice of Dan Turpin in Superman: The Animated Series, Mr. Start in Ice Age: The Meltdown), dies from pancreatic cancer at age 82.
- August 20: Jerry Lewis, American comedian, actor, singer, director, producer, writer and humanitarian (voice of the title character in The Nutty Professor, Stationmaster in Curious George 2: Follow That Monkey!, Professor John Frink, Sr. in The Simpsons episode "Treehouse of Horror XIV"), dies from cardiovascular disease at age 91.
- August 24: Jay Thomas, American actor, comedian and radio personality (voice of Ares in Hercules, Barry Anger in Teacher's Pet, Brett Morris in American Dad!, Mr. Sludge in the Goof Troop episode "A Goof of the People", Achmed Abjeer in the Duckman episode "The Road to Dendron", Bull Seal in The Wild Thornberrys episode "Tamper Proof Seal"), dies from throat cancer at age 69.
- August 25: Jack Keil, American advertising executive (creator and voice of McGruff the Crime Dog), dies at age 94.
- August 27: Rochelle Linder, American office manager (Family Guy, American Dad!, The Cleveland Show), dies at age 59.

=== September ===
- September 1: Peadar Lamb, Irish actor (voice of Grandpa Piggley Winks in Jakers! The Adventures of Piggley Winks), dies at age 87.
- September 5: Hansford Rowe, American actor (voice of the Thunderer in Spider-Man: The Animated Series), dies at age 93.
- September 10:
  - Xavier Atencio, American animator and lyricist (Walt Disney Animation Studios), dies at age 98.
  - Len Wein, American comic book writer (DC Comics, Marvel Comics, Bongo Comics), editor and television writer (The Transformers, Batman: The Animated Series, Marvel Animation, Exosquad, Conan and the Young Warriors, Phantom 2040, G.I. Joe Extreme, DIC Entertainment, Street Fighter, Mainframe Entertainment, Godzilla: The Series, RoboCop: Alpha Commando, Kong: The Animated Series, Kappa Mikey, Ben 10, Beware the Batman, Transformers: Robots in Disguise, co-creator of Swamp Thing), dies at age 69.
- September 15: Harry Dean Stanton, American actor, musician and singer (provided the singing voice of Brave Heart Lion in The Care Bears Movie, voice of Balthazar in Rango), dies at age 91.
- September 22: Fernando Escandon, Mexican-American actor (voice of El Dorado in Super Friends, Don Toro in Jakers! The Adventures of Piggley Winks, Pirate in The Pagemaster, Dr. Salazer in The Real Adventures of Jonny Quest episode "The Mummies of Malenque", Cohila in the Extreme Ghostbusters episode "The Crawler", Professor Spinoza in The Wild Thornberrys episode "Blood Sisters"), dies at age 55.
- September 26: Barry Dennen, American actor (voice of Ramsis Dendup in Star Wars: The Clone Wars, Salesperson in The Grim Adventures of Billy & Mandy, Czar Nicholas II in the Animaniacs episode "Nothing but the Tooth", Shadow Agent in the Batman: The Animated Series episode "Off Balance"), dies from complications from a fall at age 79.
- September 27: Hugh Hefner, American magazine editor (voiced himself in The Simpsons episode "Krusty Gets Cancelled", the Family Guy episode "Airport '07", and the Robot Chicken episode "Drippy Pony"), dies at age 91.
- September 28: Benjamin Whitrow, English actor (voice of Fowler in Chicken Run), dies at age 80.

=== October ===
- October 2: Tom Petty, American musician and actor (voice of Lucky and Mud Dobber in King of the Hill, himself in The Simpsons episode "How I Spent My Strummer Vacation"), dies from a drug overdose at age 66.
- October 16:
  - Roy Dotrice, English actor (voice of Destroyer in Spider-Man, Frederick in the Batman: The Animated Series episode "The Lion and the Unicorn", narrator in The Prince and the Pauper), dies at age 94.
  - Sean Hughes, British-born Irish comedian, writer and actor. (voice of Finbar the great Mighty Shark in Rubbadubbers), dies at age 51.
- October 24: Robert Guillaume, American actor and singer (voice of Rafiki in The Lion King franchise, Detective Catfish in Fish Police, the Narrator in Happily Ever After: Fairy Tales for Every Child, Mr. Thicknose in The Land Before Time VIII: The Big Freeze, Ben in The Adventures of Tom Thumb and Thumbelina, Mr. Corblarb in The Addams Family episode "Color Me Addams", Dr. Parker in The Proud Family episode "Behind Family Lines"), dies from prostate cancer at age 89.

=== November ===
- November 16: Hiromi Tsuru, Japanese actress and narrator (voice of Bulma in the Dragon Ball franchise, Meryl Strife in Trigun, Ukyo Kuoji in Ranma ½, Reiko Mikami in Ghost Sweeper Mikami), dies at age 57.
- November 17: Earle Hyman, American actor (voice of Panthro in ThunderCats), dies at age 91.
- November 19: Della Reese, American singer and actress (voice of Eema in Dinosaur, the Blue Fairy in the Happily Ever After: Fairy Tales for Every Child episode "Pinocchio"), dies at age 86.
- November 21: David Cassidy, American actor and singer (voice of Roland Pond in the Kim Possible episode "Oh Boyz"), dies at age 67.
- November 29: Heather North, American actress (second voice of Daphne Blake in Scooby-Doo), dies at age 71.

=== December ===
- December 8: Josy Eisenberg, French film producer (À Bible Ouverte), dies at age 83.
- December 9: Grant Munro, Canadian animator and film director (Neighbours), dies at age 94.
- December 10: Bruce Brown, American film director (voice of the Narrator in the SpongeBob SquarePants episode "SpongeBob SquarePants vs. The Big One"), dies at age 80.
- December 14: Bob Givens, American animator, character designer, and lay-out artist (Walt Disney Company, Warner Bros. Cartoons, Hanna-Barbera, DePatie-Freleng Enterprises), dies at age 99.
- December 28: Rose Marie, American actress, singer, and comedian (voice of Agatha Caulfield in the Hey Arnold! episode "Crabby Author", Mrs. Spengler in The Real Ghostbusters episode "Ghostworld", Lotta Litter in the Yogi's Gang episode "Lotta Litter", Honna in the Freakazoid! episode "Lawn Gnomes: Chapter IV – Fun in the Sun"), dies at age 94.

== See also ==
- 2017 in anime
- List of animated television series of 2017
