= List of Oswaldo episodes =

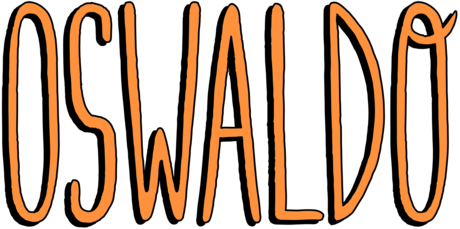

Oswaldo is an original animated series from the production company Birdo Studio. The series was created by Pedro Eboli and premiered on October 11, 2017, on Cartoon Network and on October 29, 2017, on TV Cultura. On February 7, 2018, it was announced the show had been renewed for a 39-episode second season starting June 3, 2019, but in a different move, they decided to split in half the already-ordered second season, rebranding the second half as "season 3" (which premiered on January 6, 2020) and the third half as "season 4". The series concluded with the fourth season, which premiered on November 4, 2020, and ended on January 27, 2021.

== Series overview ==
Season	Episodes	Originally released	
Season	Episodes	First released	Last released
1	13	October 11, 2017	January 1, 2018
2	13	June 3, 2019	August 26, 2019
3	13	January 6, 2020	March 18, 2020
4	13	November 4, 2020	January 27, 2021

== Episodes ==
=== Season 1 (2017–18) ===
No. overall	No. in season	Title	Written by	Original release date
1	1	"All Game and No Play"	Pedro Eboli	October 11, 2017
Oswaldo needs to return a video game to the rental store before he as well as Leia and Tobias are banned from the store.
2	2	"Beginner's Death"	Victor Brandt	October 16, 2017
After Oswaldo "dies" in a laser tag game, he thinks he really did die and starts haunting everyone at school.
3	3	"Osviral"	Andréia Midori Simão and Thiago Faelli	October 23, 2017
Leia invites Oswaldo to become her board game video assistant, but in one of her videos he ends up making a big fool of himself, turning him into a viral sensation.
4	4	"The Last Sticker"	Victor Brandt	October 30, 2017
When Oswaldo finds a special 4D sticker, everyone wants to get it and Oswaldo, Leia and Tobias get in trouble with a breath contest.
5	5	"Bestest Best Friend"	Denis Nielsen	November 6, 2017
Oswaldo tries to pick only one of his friends to take to the carnival with him.
6	6	"The Oswaldo Method"	Pedro M. Vieira	November 13, 2017
Oswaldo takes an aptitude test to see what he could be when he grows up, and he discovers he might turn out as a teacher.
7	7	"Mealsicle"	Pedro M. Vieira	November 20, 2017
On the beach, Oswaldo tells about his first Popsicle PF and decides to do a search for the popsicle with Mitchell.
8	8	"Big Babies"	Denis Nielsen	November 27, 2017
After being outraged for getting an F− in his art project, Oswaldo goes to the Kindergarten room.
9	9	"Secret Santa"	Andréia Midori Simão and Thiago Faelli	December 4, 2017
In Secret Friend, Oswaldo gets Alberto, a kid who barely knows his own class and spies on them. Him, Leia and Tobias decide to investigate who is this mysterious friend.
10	10	"Sci-Fi Fair"	Pedro M. Vieira	December 11, 2017
During Science Fair (or Sci-Fi, as the kids think) Oswaldo and Tobias play with their friends' experiments instead of preparing their own projects. In the meantime, Leia, Vivian and Sandra are preparing their own project that could earn them the grand prize, although it could go wrong.
11	11	"Oswaldobias"	Andréia Midori Simão and Thiago Faelli	December 18, 2017
Oswaldo and Tobias want to go to the arcade, but Oswaldo forgets about the family day when he and his father have to do all the chores his mother asked him to do. Oswaldo, who doesn't want to do his chores, asks Tobias to do them all in his place.
12	12	"Role-Playing"	Victor Brandt	December 25, 2017
It's Oswaldo's anniversary, but nothing goes the way he planned. Leia and Tobias decide to surprise him with a game-book that contains a surprise in the end.
13	13	"Fast Times at Oswaldo High"	Denis Nielsen	January 1, 2018
When Oswaldo goes to school on another ordinary day, he finds out that there is no one there. Completely alone, he decides to mess up everything he can and uses objects imagining that they are his friends and school staff.

=== Season 2 (2019) ===
No. overall	No. in season	Title	Written by	Storyboard by	Original release date
14	1	"Close Encounters of the Checho Kind"	Pedro M. Vieira	Caio Martins	June 3, 2019
Oswaldo, with the help of Léia and Tobias, makes a search to meet Checho, the great star of a television program.
15	2	"Bicycle Diaries"	Denis Nielsen	Tiago Kogi	June 10, 2019
Oswaldo rethinks his life and sets out on a journey around the block, meeting new friends.
16	3	"The Brunch Club"	Denis Nielsen	Gabriel Franklin	June 17, 2019
Oswaldo, P.A., Sandra, Vivian and Jermaine think they are grounded at school for something they did, and start talking about it.
17	4	"Synecdoche Oswaldo"	Guilherme Freitas	Israel Oliveira dos Santos	June 24, 2019
Oswaldo decides to create a theater play that has its protagonism, but for that, he needs a volunteer to interpret it.
18	5	"Stego and Saurus - Pleading the Fifth (Grade)"	Denis Nielsen	José Pistilli	July 1, 2019
Oswaldo and Dimitri, as a pair of policemen, embark on an adventure in search of the book about dinosaurs that disappeared from the school library.
19	6	"No Hay Banda"	Arnaldo Branco	Israel Oliveira dos Santos	July 8, 2019
Oswaldo, Léia and Tobias decide to form a band. But reaching consensus is not as easy as it sounds.
20	7	"Oswaldo Goes Advertisement"	Guilherme Freitas	Érica Nagai	July 15, 2019
Oswaldo goes to work with his father, but is quickly bored.
21	8	"Oswaldo Is the New Black"	Guilherme Freitas	Gabriel Franklin	July 22, 2019
It is a excursion day, and all students are excited, until they receive the news that Gibraltar will not be the responsible teacher, but Joubert.
22	9	"Oswaldonet"	Arnaldo Branco	Silva João	July 29, 2019
When Professor Joubert confiscates all cell phones, Oswaldo creates "Oswaldonet", a new concept in interactivity.
23	10	"Stuck In The Traffic With You"	Pedro M. Vieira	José Pistilli	August 5, 2019
While his mother and father discuss GPS in traffic, Oswaldo gets out of the car to buy water.
24	11	"Bad Hair Day"	Pedro M. Vieira	Érica Nagai	August 12, 2019
It's a party day at school, but the focus of the students is the bathroom, occupied by Mitchell, who makes Jermaine his hostage.
25	12	"Workopolis"	Guilherme Freitas	Israel Oliveira dos Santos	August 19, 2019
All the children are in the Workopolis park. Everyone except Oswaldo, who was left out for being too lazy.
26	13	"Jeorigins: Jermaine Begins"	Denis Nielsen	Gabriel Franklin	August 26, 2019
Jermaine has a flashback about his childhood.

=== Season 3 (2020) ===
No. overall	No. in season	Title	Written by	Storyboard by	Original release date
27	1	"Hunger Roulade"	Pedro M. Vieira	José Pistilli	January 6, 2020
Oswaldo's gang fights for a swiss roll which is the only source of food they have.
28	2	"He's Not That Into Woof"	Janaína Tokitaka	Ana Flávia Marchetti	January 6, 2020
Oswaldo gets a pet puppy, but soon realizes that he demands a lot of responsibility and companionship.
29	3	"The Wizard of Oswaldo"	Mariana Tesch	Érica Nagai	January 6, 2020
Oswaldo is lost in a big department store looking for an important item for his mother. When he meets Leia, Tobias and Mitchell they decide to visit Big Wizz, the famous magician of the store, who has answers for almost everything.
30	4	"Ladies Forever"	Janaína Tokitaka	Gabriel Franklin	January 13, 2020
Because she can't adapt to Oswaldo and Tobias' games, Leia joins a girls-only club.
31	5	"Chez Joubert"	Pedro M. Vieira	Israel Oliveira Dos Santos	January 20, 2020
After hearing a rumor about Joubert keeping all toys confiscated in his home, the students decide to create a plan to recover their belongings.
32	6	"The Shape of The Black Lagoon"	Guilherme Freitas	Rodrigo Estravini	January 27, 2020
After having his wedding photo album stolen by a mysterious lake creature, Gilbratar launches a challenge to hunt the monster; Oswaldo wants to win at all costs, but soon realizes that glory is not what matters most.
33	7	"Elections"	Jasmin Tenucci	José Pistilli	February 3, 2020
Marylee tells students that they must vote for a class president to be able to acquire the right to go to the bathroom during class. Leia is excited about this, but she has to find a way to beat Tobias, who has strong popular support due to the extravagant promises he makes.
34	8	"My Friend Lanky Lace"	Guilherme Freitas	Tiago Kogi	February 10, 2020
Oswaldo finds a new "friend" named Lanky Lace, but is irritated by his innocent attitude.
35	9	"A Crazy Stopover"	Guilherme Freitas	José Pistilli	February 17, 2020
Oswaldo, Léia and Tobias are on an excursion to the unmissable show of the Country Funk Samba Stars. Nothing could go wrong, unless the snack stop was commanded by an artificial intelligence robot that wishes, at all costs, to prevent them from continuing their journey.
36	10	"Oswaldo from 9 to 9:15"	Mariana Tesch	Breno Guerreiro	February 24, 2020
Zander asks Oswaldo to take care of the store for fifteen minutes while he goes to the bathroom. After some time, Zander returns to the store and there is fire all over.
37	11	"Mr. Ramierz's Secret"	Jasmin Tenucci	Luan Hilton	March 4, 2020
Tobias discovers the most important rule of a barber: what is said in the cut, stays cut. He then learns in the most difficult way: a child tells a secret about Seu Ramiro and his past.
38	12	"Launch Day Quest"	Pedro M. Vieira	Gabriel Franklin	March 11, 2020
Oswaldo, Leia and Tobias are super excited for the launch of the game "Finite Cosmotrip XV: The Final Journey", but when they arrive at the gallery of the rental company and are faced with an endless line.
39	13	"User OMS_1942"	Gustavo Suzuki	José Pistilli	March 18, 2020
Oswaldo tells his friends that he believes their lives are part of a TV show.

=== Season 4 (2020–21) ===
No. overall	No. in season	Title	Written by	Storyboard by	Original release date
40	1	"The Whisper"	Pedro M. Vieira	Gabriel Franklin	November 4, 2020
Leia plots to scare Oswaldo after he claims that he is not afraid of a new horror movie.
41	2	"Jermaine: Fire and Magic Show"	Janaína Tokitaka	Breno Guerreiro	November 11, 2020
Leia tries to uncover the secret of Jermaine's magic tricks.
42	3	"Meta-metamorphosis"	Mariana Tesch	Luan Hilton	November 18, 2020
Oswaldo, Leia and Tobias learn how to be rebels but soon realize it is not so much fun.
43	4	"Life and Death of Charlie Fisher"	Janaína Tokitaka	José Pistilli	November 25, 2020
Tobias is sad because he lost his fish Charlie Fisher. Oswaldo tries to cheer him up but ends up realizing that he's also sad and doesn't know how to deal with it.
44	5	"My Fair Oswaldo"	Mariana Tesch	Breno Guerreiro	December 2, 2020
Oswaldo gets help from Janet to learn how to be classy for a gala dinner, but he ends up losing all his personality.
45	6	"The Breakup"	Mariana Tesch	Tiago Kogi	December 9, 2020
After Leia and Tobias fight, Oswaldo is forced to choose between his two best friends.
46	7	"Ozzy's Oil"	Janaína Tokitaka	Tiago Kogi	December 16, 2020
Oswaldo, Leia and Tobias help Ozzy when his cafeteria is closed for hygiene violations.
47	8	"Coconut Wars"	Guilherme Freitas	José Pistilli	December 23, 2020
Vivian learns she has been excluded from a school coconut war because she wins everything.
48	9	"Old Men Gang"	Gustavo Suzuki	Luan Hilton and Mateus Grazina	December 30, 2020
When an argument between Oswaldo and Mitchell escalates an unlikely gang step in to help.
49	10	"Zander's Spaceship"	Guilherme Freitas	Tiago Kogi	January 6, 2021
Oswaldo, Leia and Tobias try a new VR space game with Zander, but it becomes hard work.
50	11	"Anti-Leia"	Pedro M. Vieira	Julia Simas	January 13, 2021
Frustrated by her friends' lack of interest in their homework, Leia becomes rebellious.
51	12	"Granpa Waldo"	Janaína Tokitaka	Breno Guerreiro	January 20, 2021
Oswaldo is upset because his grandpa's 80th birthday is on the same day as Zander's video game rental shop sale. Grandpa also doesn't seem very happy about the party and proposes a deal with Oswaldo: if Oswaldo helps him to find the Samba place he used to go, he'll help the boy go to the store.
52	13	"Parents and Children"	Mariana Tesch	José Pistilli	January 27, 2021
The kids try to help Terence choose the perfect Christmas surprise for Mitchell.
