= Oswaldo (TV series) =

Brazilian-Indian animated series

- Promotional poster. From left to right, Tobias, Oswaldo, and Leia.
- Genre: Comedy; Adventure
- Created by: Pedro Eboli
- Directed by: Pedro Eboli (S1); Antônio Linhares; Beto Gomez (S2–4)
- Voices of: Joel Vieira; Melissa Garcia; Vini Wolf; Mabel Cezar; Francisco Jr. Pedro Eboli
- Ending theme: "MEOW MEOW" by StevenAL
- Composer: Submarino Fantástico
- Countries of origin: Brazil; India (S2–4)
- Original languages: Portuguese; English
- No. of seasons: 4
- No. of episodes: 52 (list of episodes)

Production
- Executive producers: Luciana Eguti; Paulo Muppet; Vanessa Remonti
- Producer: Janaína de Castro Alves
- Running time: 11 minutes
- Production companies: Birdo Studio; Symbiosys Entertainment (S2–4)

Original release
- Network: Cartoon Network (Brazil); TV Cultura (Brazil); Disney Channel (India)
- Release: October 11, 2017 – January 27, 2021

Oswaldo is an animated television series created by Pedro Eboli for Cartoon Network. The series was produced in Brazil by Birdo Studio, while the second season to the fourth and final season was produced in association with the Indian studio Symbiosys Entertainment. It first premiered on Cartoon Network in Brazil on October 11, 2017 and on TV Cultura on October 29, 2017.

The series is produced by Birdo Studio, which is notoriously recognized as one of the main Brazilian animation studios and gained worldwide fame by creating and developing the mascots of the 2016 Summer Olympics and Summer Paralympics. The studio also developed the short films involving the two mascots that were shown on Cartoon Network Brazil during the period prior to the games.

== Plot ==
Oswaldo shows the daily life of a 12-year old penguin who is in the 6th grade. Together with his friends Tobias and Leia, he faces the challenge of surviving school. Infused with humour and segments of Brazilian pop culture, the series follows the title character and his immense ability to transform the simplest situations in life into epic journeys. Oswaldo's oddities are part of the daily life of his family and friends who understand that it is our eccentricities that make each of us special.

== Characters ==
- Oswaldo (voiced by Joel Vieira) A 12-year-old penguin.
- Leia (voiced by Melissa Garcia) Oswaldo's best friend.
- Tobias (voiced by Vini Wolf) Oswaldo's best friend.

== Voice cast ==
=== Brazilian Portuguese cast ===
- Joel Vieira as Oswaldo
- Melissa Garcia as Leia
- Vini Wolf as Tobias

== Episodes ==
| Season | Episodes | Originally released | |
| Season | Episodes | First released | Last released |
|---|---|---|---|
| 1 | 13 | October 11, 2017 | January 1, 2018 |
| 2 | 13 | June 3, 2019 | August 26, 2019 |
| 3 | 13 | January 6, 2020 | March 18, 2020 |
| 4 | 13 | November 4, 2020 | January 27, 2021 |

== Production ==
The show was a runner-up for an idea pitching project in Brazil back in 2014, with "Cartoon.Job" being the overall winner, however it was eventually picked up for a full series.

On September 23, 2017, it was announced that the series had its international distribution rights secured by Kid Glove. On February 7, 2018, it was announced the show had been renewed for a 39-episode second season starting June 3, 2019.

The title sequence of the show was done by Dutch-American director Fons Schiedon.

== International release ==
| Country / region | Channel | Series premiere | Title in country |
|---|---|---|---|
| Brazil | Cartoon Network; TV Cultura | October 11, 2017; October 29, 2017 | Oswaldo |
| France | Gulli; Canal J | November 30, 2019 | Oswaldo |
| South Korea | Tooniverse | February 1, 2019 | 크레이지 펭! 오스왈도 (Crazy Penguin Oswaldo) |
| Southeast Asia | Disney Channel | February 2, 2019 | Oswaldo |
| Middle East and North Africa | Cartoon Network MENA | 18 August 2019 | أوزوالدو |
| Latin America | Cartoon Network | August 16, 2018 | Oswaldo |
| Israel | Arutz HaYeladim | 2019 | אוסוולדו |
| Italy | Boing (Italy); Cartoon Network (Italy) | January 28, 2019 | Oswaldo |
| Turkey | Cartoon Network Turkey | 2019 | Oswaldo |
| Hungary; Romania; Czech Republic; Slovenia; Serbia | Minimax | 2021 | Oswaldo (Hungary/Romania); Osvaldo (Czechia/Slovenia/Serbia) |
| United Kingdom | CBBC | July 25, 2022 | Oswaldo |
