= List of Nella the Princess Knight episodes =

The following is a list of episodes from the series Nella the Princess Knight.

== Series overview ==
Season	Episodes		Originally released		
Season	Episodes		First released	Last released	Network
1	48	23	February 6, 2017	December 22, 2017	Nickelodeon
1	48	25	February 12, 2018	November 2, 2018	Nick Jr. Channel
2	20	17	November 21, 2018	December 8, 2019	Nick Jr. Channel
2	20	3	July 21, 2021		Paramount+

== Episodes ==
=== Season 1 (2017–18) ===
No. overall	No. in season	Title	Directed by	Written by	Storyboard by	Original release date	Prod. code	U.S. viewers (millions)
Part 1: Nickelodeon
1	1	"Sir Clod"	Jez Hall	Jim Nolan	Alfredo Cassano	February 6, 2017	102	1.06
1	1	"Up All Knight"	Jez Hall	Alison McDonald	Allan Abelardo	February 6, 2017	102	1.06
Nella helps Clod find his invitation to the Royal Cafe Breakfast Buffet. Nella frees a phoenix from the knight brigade tower. Song: Be Kind
2	2	"Princess Nella's Orc-hestra"	Jez Hall	Jim Nolan	Alfredo Cassano	February 8, 2017	101	0.98
2	2	"The Blaine Game"	Jez Hall	Kevin Del Aguila	Francesca Chericoni	February 8, 2017	101	0.98
Gork the orc keeps interrupting Nella's concert. Song: Our Song's Not Complete Nella and Garrett spot a pink polka dotted dragon on the mountains; meanwhile, Blaine thinks he could do everything better than Nella. Song: The Best
3	3	"New Kid in the Kingdom"	Jez Hall	Jim Nolan	Francesca Chericoni	February 10, 2017	105	0.86
3	3	"Big Birthday Surprise"	Jez Hall	Naomi Smith & Jessica Silcock	Fernando G. Yache	February 10, 2017	105	0.86
The new girl named Willow moves to Castlehaven and worries that her new friends will laugh at her green hair. Nella tracks down Garrett's childhood dragon friend, Bigor for a birthday surprise.
4	4	"That's What Best Friends Are For"	Jez Hall	Dana Chan	Alfredo Cassano	February 14, 2017	108	0.88
4	4	"In Hot Watermelon"	Jez Hall	Jim Nolan	Francesca Chericoni	February 14, 2017	108	0.88
"That's What Best Friends Are For": Trinket refuses to admit that she is sick on the day of a big parade. Song: We're Besties "In Hot Watermelon": Willow enters a gardening contest and accidentally creates an enormous watermelon. Song: You Won't Ever Know
5	5	"The Dragon Bully"	Jez Hall	Kevin Del Aguila	Allan Abelardo	February 16, 2017	104	0.87
5	5	"Royaliscious Plumberry"	Jez Hall	Emma Nisbet	Alessandra Sorrentino	February 16, 2017	104	0.87
A dragon bully causes problems in the kingdom. Song: Things Are Gonna Turn Out Fine Troublesome creatures overrun the mall when a new ice cream flavor is launched.
6	6	"The Sparkle Fest Showdown"	Jez Hall	Emma Nisbet	Robin French	March 3, 2017	107	0.80
6	6	"The Sparkle Splash Friends Day"	Jez Hall	Emma Nisbet	Alessandra Sorrentino	March 3, 2017	107	0.80
"The Sparkle Fest Showdown": Going up against Clod for the Sparkle Fest Championship brings out Trinket's competitive side. "The Sparkle Splash Friends Day": Nella has organized a day at the Sparkle Splash Playspace for her friends, but then a mysterious pink mist invades the kingdom. Song: Friendship Gift
7	7	"Sir Coach's Knightly Trading Card"	Jez Hall	Kevin Del Aguila	Alessandra Sorrentino	March 17, 2017	109	0.87
7	7	"A Knight's Tale"	Jez Hall	Ashley Mendoza	Francesca Chericoni	March 17, 2017	109	0.87
"Sir Coach's Knightly Trading Card": When they accidentally ruin Sir Coach's favorite trading card, Nella and Garrett seek out to create a replica. "A Knight's Tale": Nella and her friends are excited because a celebrity is coming to Castlehaven. Song: Brave, Brave Sir Hamsworth / Wonderful, Wonderful Rumblefang
8	8	"Three's a Crowd"	Jez Hall	Ron Holsey	Alfredo Cassano	March 31, 2017	112	1.01
8	8	"More Than Meets the Eye"	Jez Hall	Emma Nisbet	Francesca Chericoni	March 31, 2017	112	1.01
"Three's a Crowd": While at the mall, Trinket becomes jealous when Nella spends more time with Minatori. Song: That's What Best Friends Do "More Than Meets the Eye": A cyclops interrupts Nella and Trinket's ballet recital. Song: A World Waiting Out There
9	9	"The Flutter Blunder"	Jez Hall	Kevin Del Aguila	Fernando Yache	May 5, 2017	106	0.94
9	9	"A Striking Surprise"	Jez Hall	Jim Nolan	Francesca Chericoni	May 5, 2017	106	0.94
"The Flutter Blunder": Nella's messenger falcon accidentally delivers some confusing invitations for Clod's birthday party. "A Striking Surprise": Nella helps an impkin compete in the Castlehaven Bowling Tournament.
10	10	"No Gown, No Crown, No Party"	Jez Hall	Sam Dransfield	Francesca Chericoni	May 19, 2017	110	0.80
10	10	"Clod Monet"	Jez Hall	Kevin Del Aguila	Fernando G. Yache	May 19, 2017	110	0.80
"No Gown, No Crown, No Party": Olivia tries to convince that Minatori would kiss a frog at a party. Song: That's What Matters Instead "Clod Monet": Clod paints pictures of Trinket to the fact that she doesn't like them. Song: Masterpiece
11	11	"Royally Awesome Beach Day"	Jez Hall	Lucas Mills	Alfredo Cassano	June 9, 2017	113	1.16
11	11	"Stop Dragon Me Around"	Jez Hall	Kevin Del Aguila	Francesca Chericoni	June 9, 2017	113	1.16
"Royally Awesome Beach Day": Sea dragons threaten to ruin the beach. "Stop Dragon Me Around": Smelgly partners up with Olivia for a scavenger hunt.
12	12	"The Share Faire"	Jez Hall	Liam Farrell	Alessandra Sorrentino	June 16, 2017	111	1.32
12	12	"Hooves Got Talent?"	Jez Hall	Sarah Jenkins	Alfredo Cassano	June 16, 2017	111	1.32
"The Share Faire": When Nella attends the school's craft fair, Blaine gets jealous. Song: Turn Lemons Into Lemonade "Hooves Got Talent?": Clod does not have any talent than Trinket or the other horses.
13	13	"Knighty Knight Dragons"	Jez Hall	Clark Stubbs	Alessandra Sorrentino	June 23, 2017 (Note: This episode was released early on iTunes on January 9, 2017.)	103	1.07
13	13	"Inside and Seek"	Jez Hall	Lucas Mills	Alfredo Cassano	June 23, 2017	103	1.07
"Knighty Knight Dragons": When sleepy dragons move to Castlehaven because of a scary monster in their cave, Nella sets out to find it. Song: There's Not a Thing to Fear "Inside and Seek": Nella's new friend Minatori wants to play hide-and-seek, but her reluctance to follow the rules causes chaos in the castle. Song: Come Out Come Out
14	14	"Of Critters and Dragons"	Jez Hall	Sarah Jenkins	Fernando G. Yache	June 30, 2017	114	1.15
14	14	"Carriages, Carts and Giantmobiles"	Jez Hall	Dana Chan	Francesca Chericoni	June 30, 2017	114	1.15
"Of Critters and Dragons": After Garrett and Nella make a female mechanical dragon named Fire heart, the Orange-Striped Dragon for show and tell, things get out of hand as Nella brings critters to show and tell. "Carriages, Carts and Giantmobiles": Two rock giant brothers argue with each other, causing the family carriage containing Nella's parents and imouto to become stuck on top of the tip of a raised bridge leading to Lilymyre Meadows where they planned to fly kites. Song: I'm Your Bro
15	15	"Nella vs. The Wicked Wizard"	Mick Harrison & Oren Mashkovski	Scott Gray	Francesca Chericoni	August 11, 2017	123	0.97
Nella seeks out to find the Wicked Wizard, who took all of Castlehaven's fanciest things.
16	16	"Princess Nella's Perfect Family Picture"	Mick Harrison & Oren Mashkovski	Sarah Jenkins	Francesca Chericoni	September 15, 2017	116	0.57
16	16	"Giant Trouble"	Mick Harrison & Oren Mashkovski	Clark Stubbs	Alfredo Cassano	September 15, 2017	116	0.57
"Princess Nella's Perfect Family Picture": Trinket becomes desperate on royal picture day. "Giant Trouble": Two arguing giants threaten Nella and Norma's bonding.
17	17	"Dueling Sleepovers"	Mick Harrison & Oren Mashkovski	Jessica Silcock & Naomi Smith	Alfredo Cassano	October 6, 2017	117	0.65
17	17	"The Great Doodle Star"	Mick Harrison & Oren Mashkovski	Jim Nolan	Alfredo Cassano	October 6, 2017	117	0.65
"Dueling Sleepovers": Nella and Trinket make a big mistake when they attend a sleepover with both Garrett and Minatori. "The Great Doodle Star": Garrett and Blaine disobey the rules by sneaking out to see a star.
18	18	"The Halloween Hippogriff"	Mick Harrison & Oren Mashkovski	Kevin Del Aguila	Alfredo Cassano & Alessandra Sorrentino	October 13, 2017	121	0.73
18	18	"King Gork the First"	Mick Harrison & Oren Mashkovski	Jim Nolan	Isadora Morales Chaves	October 13, 2017	121	0.73
"The Halloween Hippogriff": Blaine sets out to give everybody a big scare at Nella's Halloween party. Song: Let's Hear It for Halloween "King Gork the First": Gork the Orc becomes king for a day, and he wants to have fun...too much fun, that is.
19	19	"Trink On The Rink"	Mick Harrison	Sam Barlow	Alfredo Cassano	October 20, 2017	124	0.56
19	19	"The Brave Dragon"	Mick Harrison	Jim Nolan	Alfredo Cassano	October 20, 2017	124	0.56
"Trink On The Rink": Trinket is desperate on going to the Castlehaven Rollerfest until she finds a pair of magical roller skates. "The Brave Dragon": Blaine gets jealous over the fact that Garrett took his place in a talent show.
20	20	"Sir Coach's Quest"	Mick Harrison & Oren Mashkovski	Dustin Ferrer	Lior Lev	October 27, 2017	115	0.63
20	20	"The Dragon Knight"	Mick Harrison & Oren Mashkovski	Ashley Mendoza	Alessandra Sorrentino	October 27, 2017	115	0.63
"Sir Coach's Quest": Nella tags along on Sir Coach's quest. "The Dragon Knight": Nella helps Smelgly fulfill her dream to be a knight. Song: There's a Lot of Ways to Be a Knight
21	21	"Triple Play"	Mick Harrison & Oren Mashkovski	Sarah Nerboso	Touraj Khosravi	November 3, 2017	125	0.46
21	21	"Flutter 2.0"	Mick Harrison & Oren Mashkovski	Andrew Burrell	Francesca Chericoni & Fernando G. Yache	November 3, 2017	125	0.46
"Triple Play": Nella must stop three hydra sisters from destroying this year's Harvest Festival by teaching them how to take turns. Song: Taking Turns "Flutter 2.0": Flutter becomes jealous after Nella asks Flapper to deliver her mail.
22	22	"The Fanciest of Them All"	Mick Harrison & Oren Mashkovski	Jen Upton	Alfredo Cassano	November 17, 2017	118	0.63
22	22	"Practice Makes Progress"	Mick Harrison & Oren Mashkovski	Sarah Jenkins	Alfredo Cassano	November 17, 2017	118	0.63
"The Fanciest of Them All": Olivia asks questions on Nella's ability to become both a princess and a princess knight. "Practice Makes Progress": Nella is determined to improve through practice when it comes to losing at a contest. Song: I'll Make It If I Try
23	23	"The Knight Before Christmas"	Mick Harrison & Oren Mashkovski	Jim Nolan	Francesca Cherioni	December 22, 2017	119	1.04
Song: Christmastine is Finally Here
Part 2: Nick Jr. channel
24	24	"Let It Snow"	Mick Harrison	Ashley Mendoza	Lior Lev	February 12, 2018	120A	0.47
Song: Turn It Down
25	25	"Go Dragondaisies! Go!"	Oren Mashkovski	Ron Holsey	Alfredo Cassano	February 13, 2018	120B	0.44
Song: We Can Win It All
26	26	"Sir Blaine's Quest for Badges"	Mick Harrison	Kerri Grant	Isadora Morales Chaves	February 14, 2018	122A	0.45
27	27	"Trinket's Big Break"	Oren Mashkovski	Alex Collier	Sarah Hiorns	February 15, 2018	122B	0.42
28	28	"Surf's Down"	Mick Harrison	Adam Long	Alessandra Sorrentino & Alon Ziv	February 16, 2018	126A	0.45
Song: Sharing The Fun
29	29	"One Giant Journey"	Mick Harrison	Kevin Del Aguila	Sarah Hiorns	February 20, 2018	126B	0.50
30	30	"Nella's A-maze-ing Adventure"	Mick Harrison	Jim Nolan	David J. Butler & Isadora Morales Chaves	February 21, 2018	127A	0.53
31	31	"The Castlehaven Wrap Battle"	Mick Harrison	Ron Holsey	Francesca Cherioni	February 22, 2018	127B	0.43
32	32	"Tricks of The Trade"	Mick Harrison	Jim Nolan	Stela Dorin	February 23, 2018	129A	0.58
33	33	"The Taste Race"	Mick Harrison	Kevin Del Aguila	Alfredo Cassano	March 26, 2018	129B	0.36
34	34	"A Very Clothes Call"	Mick Harrison	Liam Farrell	Richard Bazley & Lior Lev	March 27, 2018	130A	0.38
Song: For The Jubilee Party
35	35	"Dragon Taggin'"	Mick Harrison	Liam Farrell	Alfredo Cassano	March 28, 2018	130B	0.38
Nella accompanies Snowpuff the dragon on a quest to find a legendary wishing well.
36	36	"The Day The Music Stopped"	Mick Harrison	Jim Nolan	Isadora Morales Chaves	March 29, 2018	133A	0.38
When Badalf the wicked wizard takes Nella and Olivia's musical instruments, they have to work together to get them back. Song: King Dad and the Dukes
37	37	"The Clod Couple"	Mick Harrison	Jim Nolan	Alfredo Cassano	March 30, 2018	133B	N/A
Clod moves in with Trinket while his stable undergoes roof repairs.
38	38	"Queen Mom's Day"	Mick Harrison	Melinda LaRose	Alon Ziv	May 13, 2018	135	0.27
38	38	"Dragon Playdate Disaster"	Mick Harrison	Kevin Del Aguila	Alon Ziv	May 13, 2018	135	0.27
"Queen Mom's Day": Nella and Trinket try to surprise Nella's mom for Queen Mom's Day by making her favorite pancakes but must explore an old mine to acquire the special berries required to make them before her mother wakes up but end up getting lost, forcing Queen Mom to help them navigate the mine. Song: The Greatest Mother in All the Land "Dragon Playdate Disaster": Polkadottie brings her children to Castlehaven for a playdate with Princess Norma. Princess Nella and Sir Blaine volunteer to watch them but Blaine carelessly leaves a window open forcing Nella and Sir Blaine to work together to track down the young dragons. Song: Apple Swiffle Snap Cakes
39	39	"The Duke of Sparkleburg"	Mick Harrison	Ashley Mendoza	Alon Ziv	June 24, 2018	131	0.35
39	39	"A Royal Cliffhanger"	Mick Harrison	Sarah Jenkins	Lior Shkedi	June 24, 2018	131	0.35
"The Duke of Sparkleburg": Song: Who I Am "A Royal Cliffhanger":
40	40	"Quest in The Castle"	Mick Harrison & Oren Mashkovski	Jim Nolan	Lior Lev	July 1, 2018	132	0.35
40	40	"Cute Critter Watching"	Mick Harrison & Oren Mashkovski	Emma Nisbet	Francesca Chericoni	July 1, 2018	132	0.35
"Quest in the Castle": "Cute Critter Watching": Song: Café Gotcha
41	41	"The Unicorn of the Lake"	Mick Harrison & Oren Mashkovski	Kevin Del Aguila	Touraj Khosravi	July 8, 2018	128	0.36
41	41	"Trinket's Toy Trouble"	Mick Harrison & Oren Mashkovski	Kerri Grant	Touraj Khosravi	July 8, 2018	128	0.36
"The Unicorn of the Lake": When Trinket accidentally damages her horn, Nella and her friends go on a quest to find the Unicorn of the Lake to restore it. However along the way her horn falls off in a river and Trinket fears that she will no longer be special without it. Song: That's What Makes You, You
42	42	"Nella Ever After"	Mick Harrison	Kevin Del Aguila	Denzel De Meerleer	July 15, 2018	139	0.41
42	42	"One Two Switcheroo!"	Mick Harrison	Ashley Mendoza	Ben Hennessy	July 15, 2018	139	0.41
Song: Believe in Yourself
43	43	"The Bravie Awards"	Mick Harrison	Sarah Jenkins	Denzel De Meerleer	July 22, 2018	140	0.31
43	43	"The Museum of Knightly Magic"	Mick Harrison	Kevin Del Aguila	Isadora Morales Chaves	July 22, 2018	140	0.31
"The Museum of Knightly Magic": Princess Nella's class visits the Museum of Knightly Magic which contains magic items. Badalf and Terry end up joining their tour group. However when the dangerous Sand Saber is stolen by Badalf, Nella must retrieve it before Badalf turns all of Castlehaven into sand.
44	44	"Frozen Trinket"	Mick Harrison	Jim Nolan	Isadora Morales Chaves	October 29, 2018	134	0.20
44	44	"Anything For A Friend"	Mick Harrison	Sam Dransfield	Francesca Chericoni	October 29, 2018	134	0.20
"Frozen Trinket": When Trinket is mysteriously "frozen" at the Castlehaven Carnival, everyone blames Badalf though Nella comes to suspect the wicked wizard is innocent. Song: You Don't Have to Prove You're My Best Friend
45	45	"A Princess Knight Never Gives Up"	Mick Harrison	Liam Farrell & Robert Vargas	Francesca Chericoni	October 30, 2018	136	N/A
45	45	"Joust About Time"	Mick Harrison	Kevin Del Aguila	Lior Lev	October 30, 2018	136	N/A
Song: There's No Way I'll Give Up
46	46	"Knight Riders"	Mick Harrison	Kevin Del Aguila	Alfredo Cassano & Vittorio Pirajno	October 31, 2018	137	0.20
46	46	"The Knight Who Cried Sea Monster"	Mick Harrison	Liam Farrell	Isadora Morales Chaves	October 31, 2018	137	0.20
Song: Make Sure You Have Heart Song: Way-Ho, It's Blaine-Yo
47	47	"The Courage Carriage"	Mick Harrison	Jim Nolan	Alfredo Cassano	November 1, 2018	138A	0.24
Nella and Trinket pay a visit to the Unicorn of the Lake for a tea party only to find Badalf and his goat Terry have stolen a magic crystal from the lake to redecorate his castle. During their quest to retrieve the crystal, Trinket learns a valuable lesson on courage earning herself a new magical Courage Carriage in the process that grants Trinket with super speed after her old one is damaged saving her idol from a rolling boulder.
48	48	"The Castlehaven Rescue Club"	Mick Harrison	Kevin Del Aguila	Francesca Chericoni	November 2, 2018	138B	N/A
Nella and Cici form the Castlehaven Rescue Club after Nella discovers Cici's glasses give her keen eyesight allowing her to spot danger. However Cici unintentionally causes trouble with her overenthusiastic rescue efforts. Song: The Castlehaven Rescue Club

=== Season 2 (2018–21) ===
No. overall	No. in season	Title	Directed by	Written by	Storyboard by	Original release date	Prod. code	U.S. viewers (millions)
Part 1: Nick Jr. channel
49	1	"The Unicorn Rescue"	William Gordon	Kevin Del Aguila	Isadora Morales and Denzel De Meerleer	November 21, 2018	201	0.42
Nella and Trinket visit a magical spring that shows the story of how the young Princess Nella befriended Trinket and acquired her magic necklace that allowed her to fulfill her dream of becoming a Princess Knight after saving Trinket from a dragon named Stella who had been stealing objects from Castlehaven. Song: A Princess Knight
50	2	"Awesome Blossom"	William Gordon	Liam Farrell	Mick Harrison	January 20, 2019	202	0.40
50	2	"A Dragon Ate My Homework"	William Gordon	Sam O'Neal & Neal Boushell	Alfredo Cassano	January 20, 2019	202	0.40
Song: Make a Meal of Your Dreams
51	3	"Norma's Very Big Day"	William Gordon	Kevin Del Aguila	Francesca Chericoni	February 10, 2019	203	0.31
51	3	"Minatori's Tea Party"	William Gordon	Mia Resella	Mick Harrison	February 10, 2019	203	0.31
Song: How Minotaurs Have Fun
52	4	"Clod's Big Bounce"	William Gordon	Lisa Kettle	Isadora Morales	March 3, 2019	204	0.40
52	4	"The New Neighbors"	William Gordon	Kevin Del Aguila	Denzel De Meerleer	March 3, 2019	204	0.40
Song: New Neighbors
53	5	"A Need for Steed"	William Gordon	Liam Farrell	Mick Harrison	March 31, 2019	205	0.27
53	5	"Trinket's Lost Voice"	William Gordon	Liam Farrell	Mick Harrison	March 31, 2019	205	0.27
Song: Light Up the Night
54	6	"Trinket's Bad Hair Day"	William Gordon	Peter Gaffney	Francesca Chericoni	April 28, 2019	207	0.34
54	6	"Blaine Stirs Things Up!"	William Gordon	Ron Holsey	Mick Harrison	April 28, 2019	207	0.34
55	7	"Nella in Bowling Land"	William Gordon	Howie Kremer	Isadora Morales	May 26, 2019	208	0.25
55	7	"A Tricksy Wedding"	William Gordon	Kevin Del Aguila	Denzel De Meerleer	May 26, 2019	208	0.25
Song: Rolling With the Bowling Song: Something So Beautiful
56	8	"See You Later Gladiator"	William Gordon	Matt Fleckenstein	Isadora Morales	June 16, 2019	206	0.24
56	8	"Clod O'Matic"	William Gordon	David Polsky	Denzel De Meerleer	June 16, 2019	206	0.24
Song: Think It See It Do It
57	9	"Just Another Manic Mud Day"	William Gordon	Matt Fleckenstein	Mick Harrison	July 21, 2019	209	0.26
57	9	"Best Friends Forever"	William Gordon	Kerri Grant	Francesca Chericoni	July 21, 2019	209	0.26
Song: Best Friends Forever and Ever
58	10	"Knights of the Sparkly Table"	William Gordon	Ron Holsey	Isadora Morales	August 18, 2019	210	0.23
58	10	"Knights to the Rescue"	Paul Madden	Neal Boushell & Sam O'Neal	Denzel De Meerleer	August 18, 2019	210	0.23
59	11	"Winning Friends"	William Gordon	David Polsky	Mick Harrison	September 8, 2019	211	0.34
59	11	"Willow Gets to the Root of It"	Paul Madden	Ron Holsey	Francesca Chericoni	September 8, 2019	211	0.34
Song: Win Win Song: The Roots
60	12	"The Tooth Fairy Tale"	William Gordon	Kerri Grant	Boyet Gopez and Clinton J. Priest	September 22, 2019	213	0.34
60	12	"Tough Break for Garrett"	Paul Madden	Kevin Del Aguila	Isadora Morales	September 22, 2019	213	0.34
Song: Tooth Fairy Tale Song: Tough Break
61	13	"Bouncy Babies and Springy Kings"	William Gordon	Kevin Del Aguila	Andres Alvarez	October 6, 2019	214	0.21
61	13	"Rock-A-Bye-Baby"	Paul Madden	Ron Holsey	Denzel De Meerleer	October 6, 2019	214	0.21
62	14	"Piece of Cake"	William Gordon	Liam Farrell	Isadora Morales	October 20, 2019	218	0.40
62	14	"A Tale of Two Nellas"	Paul Madden	Kerri Grant	Denzel De Meerleer	October 20, 2019	218	0.40
63	15	"A Chompling Sleepover"	William Gordon	Kerri Grant	Boyet Gopez and Clinton J. Priest	November 10, 2019	215	0.33
63	15	"Knights Making News"	Paul Madden	Liam Farrell	Francesca Chericoni	November 10, 2019	215	0.33
Song: The Bravest Knight
64	16	"Cheeks the Showstopper"	William Gordon	Kevin Del Aguila	Isadora Morales	November 24, 2019	216	0.32
64	16	"Dwayning Day"	Paul Madden	Liam Swann	Denzel De Meerleer	November 24, 2019	216	0.32
Song: Just Like You Song: A Good Steed
65	17	"Freezing Out the Fleagles"	William Gordon	Kevin Del Aguila	Isadora Morales	June 19, 2020	212	0.29
65	17	"The Big Concert"	Paul Madden	Kevin Del Aguila	Andres Alvarez	June 19, 2020	212	0.29
Song: Winter Winter Song: You and Me and the Whole Wide World
Part 2: Paramount+
66	18	"Cici Saves the Day"	William Gordon	Mia Resella	Clinton J. Priest	July 21, 2021	217	N/A
66	18	"Big Little Rides"	Paul Madden	Kerri Grant	Andres Alvarez	July 21, 2021	217	N/A
67	19	"The Queen's Court"	William Gordon	Ron Holsey	Francesca Chericoni	July 21, 2021	219	N/A
67	19	"Picture Perfect"	Paul Madden	Kerri Grant	Clinton J. Priest	July 21, 2021	219	N/A
Song: I Can't Wait
68	20	"The Great Sparkle Quest"	William Gordon	Ron Holsey	Isadora Morales	July 21, 2021	220	N/A
68	20	"Twinkle Twinkle Family Vacation"	Paul Madden	Liam Farrell	Erin Mercer	July 21, 2021	220	N/A
Song: A Princess Knight Song: Everything is Better on Vacation
