= Billy the Krill =

Uruguayan animated television series

- Also known as: Billy the Krill
- Genre: Comedy
- Created by: Ricardo Pisano
- Screenplay by: Ricardo Pisano, Fernando Schmidt
- Directed by: Ricardo Pisano
- Composers: Martín Ariosa, Bruno Boselli, Gastón Otero, Ricardo Pisano
- Country of origin: Uruguay
- Original language: Spanish
- No. of seasons: 1
- No. of episodes: 4

Production
- Executive producers: Irene Goncalvez, Enrique Pereira, Ricardo Pisano
- Running time: 5-7 minutes
- Production company: Coyote Sociedad Animada
- Budget: US$100,000

Original release
- Network: TNU
- Release: September 25, 2017

Billy the Krill (also known as Billy the Krill, la leyenda de la Antártida) is an Uruguayan animated television series produced by Coyote Sociedad Animada and aired in TNU in 2017.

== Premise ==
The plot follows the story of Billy, a krill that wants to change his own destiny and that of his own species by showing the world that the krill are not second to last on the scale of living beings of Antarctica and also aims to conquer that region.

This work was produced as an interactive multimedia product aimed to the children as well as to adults as a family entertainment with educational purposes, teaching with humour about science and the Antarctica.

== Characters ==
- Billy, the krill and main character of the series.
- Washington García, a railway employee who for bureaucratic reasons ends working at the Artigas Base.
- Aquiles, Washington García's hamster.

== Production ==
The main character was created in 2006 by then student in Animation Campus, Mariana López, as an end project of animated character design course.

Production company Coyote Sociedad Animada since then began, at first without success, to seek for financing to produce the series. By 2013 it obtained 1.5 million pesos after gaining a contest of the Ministry of Industry, Energy and Mining's National Communications Directorate, to produce an educational audiovisual project aimed at children, but it had to change the initial project: from 13 episodes of 11 minutes to 4 episodes of 5 minutes, and adding to it an educational and multimedia profiles, with the possibility to broadcast it to Plan Ceibal platform. Subsequently they obtained 450.000 pesos from the Intendency of Montevideo and another fund of 30.000 US dollars. The producer company invested 500.000 pesos.

The production and funding of the series lasted approximately a 10-year process. It was created and directed by Ricardo Pisano, who also was in charge of the art and characters design. Pisano himself as well as Irene Goncalvez and Enrique Pereira were the executive producers, the latter also in charge of post-production. Teleplay was written by Fernando Schmidt and Pisano. Martín Ariosa was the theme composer and he together with Bruno Boselli, Gastón Otero and Ricardo Pisano —also as a lyricist— where the music composers. Alvar Carranza and Richard Fariña were the scientific advisors to the project.

In addition to the animated series, this project included a "multiplatform dialogue" with an expectation campaign through social networks and a future mobile app.

== Broadcast ==
The 4-episode series began to be broadcast in "El canal de los niños" ("The Children's Channel") children's programming block of statewide TNU air channel, which is aired from Monday to Friday at 10:30 a.m. and 5:00 p.m. and Saturdays and Sundays at 8:30 a.m. and 3:30 p.m.

== See also ==
- Television in Uruguay
