= Nella the Princess Knight =

- Created by: Christine Ricci
- Developed by: Clark Stubbs
- Voices of: Akira Golz; Samantha Hahn; Micah Gursoy; Matthew Gumley
- Theme music composer: Gabriel Mann; Jeannie Lurie
- Opening theme: "Nella the Princess Knight" performed by April Bender
- Ending theme: "Nella the Princess Knight" (instrumental)
- Composer: Matt Mahaffey
- Country of origin: United States
- Original language: English
- No. of seasons: 2
- No. of episodes: 68 (list of episodes)

Production
- Executive producers: Cathal Gaffney; Darragh O'Connell
- Producers: Emma Fernando; Gillian Higgins
- Running time: 11 minutes
- Production companies: Brown Bag Films; Nickelodeon Animation Studio

Original release
- Network: Nickelodeon
- Release: February 6 – December 22, 2017
- Network: Nick Jr. Channel
- Release: February 12, 2018 – December 8, 2019
- Network: Paramount+
- Release: July 21, 2021

Nella the Princess Knight is an American animated children's television series created by Christine Ricci, premiering on Nickelodeon on February 6, 2017. Toys produced for the series are manufactured by Vivid Imaginations. The show was removed from Paramount+ on January 1, 2024, along with Sunny Day.

== Plot ==
The series follows Princess Nella, a girl who saves the citizens of her parents' kingdom by turning into a princess knight whenever there is catastrophic trouble. She goes on missions with Trinket, Sir Garrett, and Clod. Together they go on quests, solve mysteries, and learn valuable lessons.

== Episodes ==
Season	Episodes		Originally released		
Season	Episodes		First released	Last released	Network
1	48	23	February 6, 2017	December 22, 2017	Nickelodeon
1	48	25	February 12, 2018	November 2, 2018	Nick Jr. Channel
2	20	17	November 21, 2018	December 8, 2019	Nick Jr. Channel
2	20	3	July 21, 2021		Paramount+

== Characters ==
=== Main ===
- Princess Nella (voiced by Akira Golz in US and Zaris-Angel Hator in UK) is a biracial fun-loving princess who goes in the way of a knight in order to protect her kingdom. Nella is a fearless, confident, and a sweet girl. Her exploration of various hobbies and other interests are the basis of several episodes. Originally, Nella was a normal Princess who dreamed of being a knight and received her magical necklace that allows her to transform into a Princess Knight after saving and befriending the unicorn Trinket.
- Trinket (voiced by Samantha Hahn) is Nella's talking unicorn and best friend who loves fashion, making her very stylish. She is supportive and encouraging of her friends, and will be serious if the situation calls for it, in order to help Nella solve problems. Nella befriended Trinket after saving her when Trinket became trapped in slime while looking for a magic pendant inside a cave, which the unicorn later gave to Nella as a "trinket" for saving her. Since Trinket's unicorn name was impossible for Nella to pronounce she gave her the name "Trinket" as a nickname.
- Sir Garrett (voiced by Micah Gursoy) is a knight who tags along with Nella on her quests. He collects Knightly trading cards that identify different types of magical creatures. He is very smart and offers his intelligence to help the kingdom as well.
- Clod (voiced by Matthew Gumley in US and Joe Attewell in UK) is Garrett's talking steed, who has two horns on his head. He is best friends with Sir Garrett, and is also on good terms with Nella and Trinket. Quite often, Clod is the comic relief of the gang.

=== Villains ===
- Badalf (voiced by Chris Critelli) is a wizard who wishes to steal all of Castlehaven's fancy things. Though he tends to cause trouble with his magic or steals important magical items for himself he can be friendly at times and in one episode is falsely accused of freezing Trinket at a carnival though Nella later discovers it was all a misunderstanding and Badalf was innocent.
- Terry is Badalf's loyal pet goat whom often assists Badalf in his schemes. While he does not speak, Badalf can apparently understand his vocalizations.
- The Frostbite Brothers, three ice dragons known as Snowpuff (voiced by Pierce Cravens), Freezy (voiced by Chuck Lewkowiecz), and Frozey take Santa's sack of presents.
- Stella is a female Dragon who stole things from Castlehaven around the time Nella befriended Trinket. Stella accidentally kidnapped Trinket when she stole the Unicorn's sleeping bag forcing the young Princess Nella to go on a quest to save her best friend. Nella's courage in confronting Stella who had a fearsome reputation allowed Nella to transform into a Princess Knight for the first time. However though Stella stole things and appeared intimidating she felt terrible when Nella revealed she had taken Trinket and revealed she only stole things to decorate her cave. Nella, Trinket, and friends Nella made along her quest helped decorate Stella's cave. Thankful Stella returned what she stole from Castlehaven and apologized for her behavior causing King Dad to knight Nella for her bravery.

=== Recurring ===
- King Dad (voiced by Ty Jones) is Nella and Norma's dad who is the ruler of Castlehaven. Despite being a king, he's surprisingly an average dad and is pretty down to earth. He is supportive of Nella and was responsible for knighting her after she bravely confronted the dragon Stella to rescue Trinket.
- Queen Mom (voiced by Rebecca Soler in Season 1 and Alex Covington in Season 2) is Nella and Norma's mom. She is a kind and supportive mother. Like Nella, she was quite adventurous in her youth and was active in sports.
- Princess Norma (voiced by Courtney Shaw) is Nella's baby sister. Nella gets along well with Norma and often helps her parents care for Norma.
- Sir Blaine (voiced by Evan Christy) is a mean and bossy 9-year-old knight who thinks that he is the best at everything he does. Quite often, his ego causes trouble for himself, and he must ask for help.
- Olivia (voiced by Alyson Leigh Rosenfeld in Season 1 and Laurie Hymes in Season 2) is Sir Blaine's princess-obsessed cousin who often causes trouble for Nella and her friends as she is somewhat stuck-up though deep down she is a good person who often focuses too much on appearances. She admires Nella for being a Princess however was at first dismissive of the idea of a Princess Knight though she later came to be more accepting of the idea after Nella saved her. She tends to take advantage of Nella's less glamorous friends such as Smelgly and Minatori causing trouble for them, herself, and Castlehaven, though usually learns important lessons even befriending Smelgy and Minatori in the process. Like her cousin, she and Nella occasionally work together.
- The Knight Brigade (voiced by Tyler Bunch) is a group of clumsy but well-meaning knights who guard the royal castle.
- Willow (voiced by Maya Tanida in the U.S. and Kimani Arthur in the UK) is a shy 7-year-old farmer who has green hair and knows how to cultivate plants.
- Fidget is a purple and white raccoon.
- Fickle is a pink owl.
- Gork is an Orc. He has expressed instances of gender non-conformity.
- Polkadottie is a pink polka-dotted dragon who is initially referred to as Mrs. Dragon. She is the mother of a dragon that Nella finds. Her young children later become playmates of Princess Norma with Pokadottie becoming friends with Queen Mom.
- Minatori (voiced by Rivki Bench) is a friendly female minotaur. Like the classic minotaur of Greek myth, her home is a labyrinth.
- Tilly is a rabbit.
- Cici is a cyclops who has bad eyesight and must wear glasses. She befriends Nella and her friends after they teach her the importance of wearing her glasses so she can see properly.
- Smelgly is an awkward dragon who has trouble making friends. Despite being a dragon she dreams of being a knight.
- Sir Coach is an armored schoolteacher of Castlehaven and an experienced knight. He mentors Nella, Sir Garrett, and Sir Blaine in being knights. Like Sir Garrett, Sir Coach collects knightly trading cards.
- Flutter is a messenger falcon who often delivers mail for Princess Nella.
- The Unicorn of the Lake is a wise and powerful unicorn introduced in Season 2 whom Trinket idolizes and admires.

== Production ==
Nella the Princess Knight is produced by Brown Bag Films in the United Kingdom. The series was renewed for a second season on May 24, 2017.

== Broadcast ==
Nella the Princess Knight debuted on Nickelodeon in the United States on February 6, 2017. The series aired on Treehouse TV in Canada on May 6, 2017. The final three episodes of the second season were released on Paramount+ on July 21, 2021. Until, January 1, 2024, it was pulled from the streaming service.

== Home media ==
- Nickelodeon, and Paramount Home Entertainment released a DVD of the show on January 30, 2018.
- Nickelodeon, and Paramount Home Entertainment released a second DVD of the show on July 3, 2018.
- Nickelodeon, and Paramount Home Entertainment released a third DVD of the show on February 5, 2019.

== Reception ==
=== Critical response ===
Emily Ashby of Common Sense Media rated Nella the Princess Knight 5 stars, stating the series is "a lot of fun, filled with funny moments and messy encounters in a place where berry bushes can pelt people with their fruits and volcanoes spew sudsy concoctions."

=== Awards and nominations ===
Year	Award	Category	Nominee(s)	Result	Ref.
2018	NAACP Image Awards	Outstanding Children's Program	Nella the Princess Knight	Nominated	

== Books ==
A book, Nella's Unicorn Rescue, was released on March 7, 2017.
