= School of Roars =

British animated children's television series

- Genre: Children's television
- Created by: Alan Robinson
- Directed by: Alan Robinson
- Voices of: Andrew Scott; Kathy Burke; Sarah Lancashire; Che Grant; Max Pattison; Rosie Cooper-Kelly; Ellie Gee; Ben Guiver; Jess Robinson; Georgia Coates; Alan Robinson
- Narrated by: Andrew Scott
- Country of origin: United Kingdom
- Original language: English
- No. of series: 2
- No. of episodes: 104

Production
- Executive producers: Jo Killingley; Sarah Legg
- Running time: 7 minutes
- Production companies: Dot to Dot Productions; Monster Paw Productions

Original release
- Network: CBeebies
- Release: 6 February 2017 – 1 December 2022

School of Roars is a British animated children's comedy television series created by Alan Robinson. The show is about five monsters who go to a school for preschool monsters at night called the School of Roars to learn lessons whilst having fun with various activities. It was recommissioned for a second series.

== Premise ==
The show focuses on five little monsters named Wufflebump, Meepa, Icklewoo, Yummble, and Wingston through their nights of attending the School of Roars, where they're taught about how to deal with daily life problems by five big monsters named Miss Grizzlesniff, Mr. Marrow, Mrs. Twirlyhorn, Miss Sneezle, and Mr. Snapper.

== Characters ==
=== Main ===
- Wufflebump (voiced by Che Grant) is a purple rhinoceros-like monster who lives in a volcano. He is the leader of the young monsters. He can be clumsy, as he often trips over his own tail. His Italian name is "Burlagiu".
- Icklewoo (voiced by Rosie Cooper-Kelly) is a yellow goat-like monster who lives in a Dutch flower windmill. She doesn't roar as loud as the others do, as she is the smallest and a little shy. Her Italian name is "Minilu".
- Yummble (voiced by Max Pattison) is an orange monster with three eyes and legs who lives in a giant mushroom and loves to eat. He is best friends with Wufflebump. Because of his appetite, he can have a hard keeping any kind of food where it is by gobbling it up and breaking the adults' rules of not eating them at the wrong times. He has tons of favourite foods, and is shown having super stretchy arms. Unlike the other students, he can't sing out of tune and his singing is all in tune. His Italian name is "Iammi".
- Meepa (voiced by Ellie Gee in Series 1, Georgia Coates in Series 2) is a green alien-like monster who lives in a tree flat and has four hands. She likes to say her name twice, as she can never stop talking. She has a love for monster animals, and has the most flexible body out of anyone in the School of Roars. Her Italian name is "Mipa".
- Wingston Waftywing (voiced by Ben Guiver) is a blue bat-like monster who lives in a castle and is the smartest. He is depicted as the fastest monster in the school thanks to his wings, size, and energy. His Italian name is "Wingy".
- Miss Grizzlesniff (voiced by Kathy Burke) is a pink-red tyrannosaurus rex-like monster and the teacher of the School of Roars. She's one quirky teacher.

=== Other ===
- Miss Sneezle (voiced by Jess Robinson) is the school nurse. Her room isn't like any other school hospital - the students from the classroom can have squidgy pillows when they need a rest. The bandage bats can also sing a lullaby, which most of the monsters like, but Yummble doesn't because it's too squeaky. The students can also get lollipops for being brave.
- Miss Twirlyhorn (voiced by Sarah Lancashire) is the headmonstress of the School of Roars.
- Mr Marrow (voiced by Andrew Scott) is the chef who works in the café at the School of Roars. In the episode Get Well Soon, he was the substitute teacher in the classroom.
- Mr Snapper (voiced by Andrew Scott) is a photographer that looks like a crocodile. He does not work at the School of Roars, but he visits when it is in need of a camera.
- Mr. Bogglelots (voiced by Andrew Scott) is the school optician. Out of all the characters, he has the most eyes.
- Mrs. Wufflebump (voiced by Jess Robinson) is Wufflebump's mother.
- Mr. Wufflebump (voiced by Alan Robinson) is Wufflebump's father.
- Growlbert (vocal effects provided by Alan Robinson) is Wufflebump and his parents' pet monster dog.
- Mr. Yummble (voiced by Andrew Scott) is Yummble's father.
- Mrs. Yummble is Yummble's mother.
- Yummble's baby brother
- Yummble's baby sister
- Meepa's mummy
- Meepa's daddy
- Icklewoo's mummy
- Icklewoo's daddy
- Mr. Waftywing (voiced by Andrew Scott) is Wingston's father. He works as a mailman monster.
- Mrs. Waftywing is Wingston's late mother. In Series 2, she was mentioned in the episode titled "Wingston's Mummy", and was revealed to have died. Wingston misses her.
- Granny Waftywing is Wingston's grandmother.

== Episodes ==
Series	Episodes	Originally released	
Series	Episodes	First released	Last released
1	52	6 February 2017	1 May 2018
2	52	31 October 2020	20 August 2021

This is the list of episodes and their morals.

=== Series 1 ===
No.	Title	Written by	Original release date
1	""Show and Tell""	Tracey Hammett	21 December 2017
2	""Bestest Friends""	Lisa Akhurst	22 December 2017
Moral: You can have more than one best friend. If someone else plays with your friend, that doesn't mean your best friend doesn't like you anymore.
3	""Daddy's Late""	Denise Cassar	23 December 2017
Moral: You can make the most out of a boring day.
4	""I Want the Human""	Lisa Akhurst	24 December 2017
Moral: The way to achieve something isn't being the best at everything, because mistakes are not bad, they're actually good, because they're the source of learning.
5	""Monster Assembly""	Lisa Akhurst	25 December 2017
Moral: Be brave. Being small doesn't mean you can't be brave.
6	""Get Well Soon""	Sara Brabus	28 December 2017
Moral: Every teacher's a good teacher. Making mistakes doesn't make you bad.
7	""Wobbly Tooth""	Tim Dann & Neil Mossey	29 December 2017
Moral: Having a wobbly tooth is good, because if you lose a tooth, that just means another stronger tooth will grow through. Don't be afraid to have a loose tooth!
8	""Snap""	Lee Pressman	30 December 2017
Moral: Even if you think you look gorgeous, you should still stay still when a photographer visits. Also, don't stay up late at night.
9	""Boo""	Dave Ingham	31 December 2017
10	""Blushberry Blob Cakes""	Tracey Hammett	1 January 2018
11	""Wufflebump Owns Up""	Dave Ingham	4 January 2018
Moral: Nobody will be mad at you if you just own up. Note: The hopak is a Ukrainian dance.
12	""Growling Up""	Tim Dann & Neil Mossey	5 January 2018
Moral: It's OK to feel worried, but not for too long. It's much better to be brave.
13	""Nurse Meepa""	Darren Jones	6 January 2018
14	""Measuring Chart""	Sara Barbas	7 January 2018
Moral: If you're the shortest, it doesn't mean you're the worst. There's a good thing about everyone!
15	""Buddy Bench""	Howard Davidson	8 January 2018
16	""Shriekend News""	Howard Davidson	23 March 2018
Moral: Your friends will like it if you just go with all you've got. Things come out when you least expect it!
17	""Sleepover""	Gerard Foster	24 March 2018
Moral: If you need something, just be honest and tell an adult. Don't pretend you don't need what you actually need.
18	""Dressing Up""	Sara Barbas	25 March 2018
19	""Full Moon""	Tim Dann & Neil Mossey	26 March 2018
20	""Doodah""	Dave Ingham	27 March 2018
Moral: If you need the toilet, you have to go, even if you're scared.
21	""Funny Bones""	Tim Dann & Neil Mossey	30 March 2018
Moral: Don't touch fragile things. They could easily break.
22	""The Very Important Monster""	Rebecca Stevens	31 March 2018
23	""Monster Choir""	Dave Ingham	1 April 2018
Moral: Everyone has a special talent.
24	""Class Monitor""	Howard Davidson	2 April 2018
25	""Googly Glasses""	Gerald Foster	3 April 2018
Moral: Don't pretend you can't see what you can in an optician's test. If you don't need glasses, you shouldn't wear them.
26	""Wingston Wins""	Lisa Akhurst	10 August 2018
Moral: Let people do things themselves. Also, champions don't always win.
27	""Monster Book Day""	Rebecca Stevens	11 August 2018
Moral: Make the most of what you're dressed up as for World Book Day. Note: The name of this episode is a reference to World Book Day.
28	""Hoopla""	Sara Barbas	12 August 2018
Moral: Don't be a sore loser, be a good loser. Also, don't angrily break things.
29	""Monster Pet""	Rebecca Stevens	13 August 2018
30	""Time Capsule""	Tim Dann & Neil Mossey	14 August 2018
31	""My Old Scooter""	Tim Dann & Neil Mossey	17 August 2018
32	""Miss Sneezle's Birthday""	Tracey Hammett	18 August 2018
33	""Stop Copying""	Denise Cassar	19 August 2018
Moral: Don't copy people if they don't like it.
34	""Hats Off To Yummble""	Dave Ingham	20 August 2018
Moral: Don't worry about losing.
35	""Painty Play Tree""	Dave Ingham	21 August 2018
Moral: Don't touch paint that isn't dry yet.
36	""Oh Wingston!""	Dave Ingham	24 February 2019
Moral: Don't be rude.
37	""Teddy Monster""	Rebecca Stevens	25 February 2019
Moral: Don't give away something that you really love, because you'll later regret it. Note: This is the first (and probably only) episode when Yummble's baby siblings cry.
38	""Monster Joke""	Rebecca Stevens	26 February 2019
39	""Glog""	Denise Cassar	27 February 2019
40	""the Itchlings""	Tim Dann & Neil Mossey	28 February 2019
41	""The School Inspector""	Denise Cassar	3 March 2019
42	""Squish Squash Salad""	Tracey Hammett	4 March 2019
Moral: Try food you've never had before. How come you don't like something if you've never tried it?
43	""Sports Night""	Gerard Foster	5 March 2019
Moral It's not about winning or losing, it's the taking part that counts. Don't worry about losing, just be brave.
44	""Froggy""	Tracey Hammett	19 April 2018
45	""Fibbing""	Dave Ingham	20 April 2018
Moral: Tell the truth, and don't lie. Lying is really bad.
46	""Dragon Brigade""	Tracey Hammett	23 April 2018
47	""Lost Property""	Howard Davidson	24 April 2018
48	""Telling Tales""	Tim Dann	25 April 2018
Moral: Don't tell tales.
49	""Marching Band""	Alan Robinson & Simon Rolph	26 April 2018
Moral: It could be: Try other possible ways if you can't do something. Things come out when you least expect them. Note: The "bogpipes" is a reference to bagpipes. Additionally, "the boggy Highlands" is a reference to the Highlands in Scotland.
50	""Whizzy Worms""	Tracey Hammett	27 April 2018
51	""Toys""	Neil Mossey	30 April 2018
Moral: Don't play with a toy that belongs to someone else, without permission.
52	""Snowed In""	Dave Ingham	1 May 2018
Moral: Staying inside doesn't mean the day will be boring. Note: This is a Christmas episode.

=== Series 2 ===
No.	Title	Written by	Original release date
1	""School Library""	Alan Robinson	9 November 2020
Moral: Don't get distracted by cool things.
2	""Monster Post""	Alan Robinson	10 November 2020
3	""Paws and Claws""	Lee Pressman	11 November 2020
Moral: There's a special thing about every animal.
4	""Breakfast Club""	Alan Robinson	12 November 2020
5	""The Daily Growl""	Alan Robinson	13 November 2020
Moral: Don't make up fake news.
6	""Ringo""	Alan Robinson	16 November 2020
Moral: No child knows everything. Not knowing everything doesn't mean you're not good.
7	""Fangella's Biggest Fan""	Lee Pressman	17 November 2020
8	""Puppet Show""	Alan Robinson	18 November 2020
Moral: There's no such thing as perfection. Things don't have to be perfect to be good. Just go with something if it's imperfect.
9	""Computer Bug""	Alan Robinson	19 November 2020
Moral: At school, don't get distracted by cool things. Only listen to what the teacher says. Note: Mentioning and playing on "Slimey Slimey Squish Squish" is a callback to the episode titled "Daddy's Late".
10	""Grizzletown""	Alex Collier	20 November 2020
11	""Grumble Plant""	James Henry	23 November 2020
12	""Beaster Eggs""	Alex Collier	24 November 2020
13	""Pumpkin Parade""	Alan Robinson	25 November 2020
14	""Shop Meepa""	Jason Tammemagi	5 April 2021
Moral: Be humble. Give people credit if they helped you.
15	""Bird Feeder""	Alan Robinson	6 April 2021
16	""Monster Cave""	James Henry	7 April 2021
17	""Squeezing In""	Alan Robinson	8 April 2021
18	""Boring Box""	Bec Hill	9 April 2021
Moral: Using your imagination can make a boring thing fun.
19	""Funky Frames""	Bec Hill	12 April 2021
Moral: Don't worry about other people's opinions. Focus on your own.
20	""Call Miss Sneezle""	Bec Hill	13 April 2021
Moral: Don't pretend to be poorly, because being poorly isn't fun.
21	""I Hear Thunder""	Bec Hill	14 April 2021
Moral: If you hear thunder, you're safe in the room.
22	""Hot Cakes""	Sophie Dutton	15 April 2021
Moral: Some people like spicy food. Making mistakes can actually be good!
23	""Big Monsters""	Jason Tammemagi	16 April 2021
Moral: Being small isn't boring. It doesn't mean you're a baby.
24	""Mr Babble Beast""	Howard Davidson	19 April 2021
25	""Interesting Monster""	Rebecca Stevens	20 April 2021
Moral: Anything can be interesting, and a person's a thing.
26	""Frosty Claws""	Rebecca Stevens	21 April 2021
Moral: It could be: If you don't get what you want, you can make your own happiness.
27	""Safari""	Unknown	22 April 2021
Moral: It may be: You can find an adventure anywhere, even indoors. It could also be: Staying inside does not mean you can't have fun. Note: According to the subtitles on BBC iPlayer, when Meepa says her last line, she is possibly parodying David Attenborough.
28	""Camping Trip""	Unknown	23 April 2021
29	""The Greatest Showmonster""	Unknown	26 April 2021
Moral: Being different doesn't mean you can't be like someone. Being different is a good thing. Note: The name of this episode is a reference to The Greatest Showman. Also, "Huge Giantman" is a parody of Hugh Jackman.
30	""Number Wizard""	Unknown	27 April 2021
31	""Monstersitter""	Unknown	28 April 2021
32	""Swamp Trip""	Unknown	29 April 2021
33	""Mee T.V.""	Unknown	1 August 2021
Moral: Don't get carried away if you want to see or do something.
34	""The Sillies""	Unknown	2 August 2021
Moral: Don't do something that ruins the day.
35	""Tick Tock Time""	Unknown	3 August 2021
36	""Wingston's Mummy""	Unknown	4 August 2021
Moral: Using all you have can get surprising results.
37	""School Disco""	Unknown	5 August 2021
Moral: There's no right or wrong way to dance.
38	""Float""	Unknown	6 August 2021
39	""Smelling Bee""	Unknown	7 August 2021
40	""Monster Mystery""	Unknown	8 August 2021
41	""Out of this World""	Unknown	9 August 2021
42	""Swapsies""	Unknown	10 August 2021
Moral: If someone wants to swap, don't say "no".
43	""Pricklepig""	Unknown	11 August 2021
Moral: Bugs have to sleep all winter long.
44	""Messy Monster”"	Unknown	12 August 2021
Moral: If you make a mess, you'll later end up in one.
45	""Ickleblue”"	Unknown	13 August 2021
Moral: Don't be arrogant, because it makes other people sad.
46	""Club Yummble”"	Unknown	14 August 2021
Moral: Don't exclude someone if they bother you, because you'll end up feeling lonely if you exclude everyone. Just accept their apologies and carry on including them.
47	""Slimy Season”"	Unknown	15 August 2021
Moral: Listen to your parents. Wear the right clothes for when it rains.
48	""The Wrong Pictures”"	Unknown	16 August 2021
Moral: Don't edit someone else's work without permission.
49	""My Hero”"	Unknown	17 August 2021
50	""Super Goo”"	Unknown	18 August 2021
51	""Treasure Trail”"	Unknown	19 August 2021
52	""First Time”"	Unknown	20 August 2021
Moral: First times aren't scary with your friends.

== Broadcast ==
CBeebies aired the show on its debut in 2017. Then, Universal Kids was next to acquire it in August the same year with it only airing the first 26 episodes. When it ended, Universal Kids permanently removed it in 2018, but airs on Nick Jr., DeA Junior and Rai Yoyo in Italy, TG4 in Ireland and ABC Kids in Australia.
