= List of television programmes broadcast by TVB =

As Television Broadcasts Limited (TVB) is Hong Kong's largest television station, the television programmes it broadcasts form a major part of popular culture in Hong Kong. TVB programmes have major societal and cultural effects on the Hong Kong populace, influencing fashion, hairstyles, speech patterns and public attitudes. Its programmes have been and continue to be exported to many Chinese-speaking communities around the world, including Mainland China, Taiwan, Macau, Singapore, Malaysia, the Philippines, Japan, the United States, Canada, Australia, South Korea, India and most of Europe (including the United Kingdom) via satellite, video cassettes, VCDs, DVDs and the internet.

== TV drama series ==
See Lists of TVB dramas and series

== Live-Action TV series ==
=== Chinese Live-Action ===
- Journey to the West 1986
- The Legend of Haolan 皓镧传 (Jade)

=== Japanese Live-Action ===
- 1 Litre of Tears (Jade)
- Bambino! (Jade)
- Daitokai (Pearl)
- Galileo 神探伽利略 (Jade)
- Great Teacher Onizuka (Jade)
- Oooku 大奧 (Jade)
- The Prince of Tennis (Jade)

=== Japanese Tokusatsu ===
- Super Sentai series 超級戰隊系列 (Maskman, Turboranger-Zyuranger, Megaranger-Zenkaiger (excluding: GoGo V-Timeranger, Goseiger and Zyuohger))
- Ultraman series 超人系列 (Tiga-Mebius)
- Kamen Rider series 幪面超人系列 (Ryuki-Gaim)

=== American Live-Action ===
- 20/20 (Pearl)
- The 4400 (Pearl)
- Alcatraz (Pearl)
- Amazing Stories (Pearl)
- American Experience (Pearl)
- America's Funniest Home Videos (Pearl)
- America's Next Top Model (Pearl)
- Animal World (Pearl)
- Benson (Pearl)
- The Best Times (Pearl)
- Boston Public (Pearl)
- The Bozo Show (Pearl)
- Breaking Bad 絕命毒師
- Bret Maverick (Pearl)
- Captain Power and the Soldiers of the Future (Pearl)
- Charlie's Angels (Pearl)
- Cheers (Pearl)
- Civil Wars (Pearl)
- Combat Missions (Pearl)
- The Cosby Show (Pearl)
- Dallas (Pearl)
- Dark Angel (Pearl)
- A Different World (Pearl)
- Dinah! (Pearl)
- Dinosaurs (Pearl)
- Doogie Howser, M.D. (Pearl)
- Drexell's Class (Pearl)
- Dynasty (Pearl)
- ER (Pearl)
- The Fall Guy (Pearl)
- The Family Man (Pearl)
- Family Ties (Pearl)
- Felicity (Pearl)
- Firestarter: Rekindled (Pearl)
- Freaks and Geeks (Pearl)
- Free Spirit (Pearl)
- The Fresh Prince of Bel-Air (Pearl)
- Glitter (Pearl)
- Good Advice (Pearl)
- Hardcastle and McCormick (Pearl)
- Head of the Class (Pearl)
- Hearts Afire (Pearl)
- Heroes (Pearl)
- Home Improvement (Pearl)
- Hour of Power (Pearl)
- iCarly 愛卡莉
- Island Son (Pearl)
- Jackass 死蠢鬥一番 (J2)
- The Jersey (Pearl)
- Just the Ten of Us (Pearl)
- Kate & Allie (Pearl)
- Las Vegas (Pearl)
- Maggie Winters (Pearl)
- The Magical World of Disney (Pearl)
- Magnum, P.I. (Pearl)
- The Mary Tyler Moore Show (Pearl)
- Max Headroom (Pearl)
- Me and the Boys (Pearl)
- Medium
- Modern Family 行屍 (Pearl)
- Murphy Brown
- Mr. Belvedere (Pearl)
- The Muppet Show (Pearl)
- My Two Dads (Pearl)
- Naked Science (Pearl)
- Now and Again (Pearl)
- NYPD Blue (Pearl)
- Once and Again (Pearl)
- Parenthood (Pearl)
- Parker Lewis Can't Lose (Pearl)
- Party of Five (Pearl)
- Power Rangers (Pearl)
- Prison Break (Pearl)
- Private Benjamin (Pearl)
- Queer Eye (Pearl)
- Quincy, M.E. (Pearl)
- Rhoda (Pearl)
- Riptide (Pearl)
- Rituals (Pearl)
- Roseanne (Pearl)
- The Secret Circle 魔環 (J2)
- Seinfeld (Pearl)
- Simon & Simon (Pearl)
- Small Wonder (Pearl)
- Solid Gold (Pearl)
- Something Is Out There (Pearl)
- Spin City (Pearl)
- Standoff (Pearl)
- Suddenly Susan (Pearl)
- That's Incredible! (Pearl)
- Totally Hidden Video (Pearl)
- Tru Calling (Pearl)
- Ugly Betty (Pearl)
- The Walking Dead (Pearl)
- Webster (Pearl)
- The West Wing (Pearl)
- Wild, Wild World of Animals (Pearl)
- Wiseguy (Pearl)
- Wish You Were Here (Pearl)
- Who's the Boss? (Pearl)
- Without a Trace (Pearl)
- The X-Files (Pearl)

=== Australian Live-Action ===
- The Big Byte (Pearl)
- The Castaways (Pearl)
- Ferry Boat Fred (Pearl)
- Five Mile Creek (Pearl)
- Hey Dad..! (Pearl)
- Neighbours (Pearl)
- Spyforce (Pearl)
- Talkin' 'Bout Your Generation (Pearl)

=== British Live-Action ===
- After Henry (Pearl)
- At Home with the Braithwaites (Pearl)
- The Benny Hill Show (Pearl)
- Big Cat Diary (Pearl)
- The Bill (Pearl)
- Cutting Edge (Pearl)
- Delia's How to Cook (Pearl)
- Executive Stress (Pearl)
- Father, Dear Father (Pearl)
- Gems (Pearl)
- Heroes Unmasked (Pearl)
- Hogg's Back (Pearl)
- Horizon (Pearl)
- Hotel Babylon (Pearl)
- Human Universe (Pearl)
- Jekyll (Pearl)
- Jim Henson's The Storyteller (Pearl)
- Just Good Friends (Pearl)
- Merlin of the Crystal Cave (Pearl)
- Minder (Pearl)
- Monarch of the Glen (Pearl)
- The Naked Chef (Pearl)
- No Place Like Home (Pearl)
- Oliver's Twist (Pearl)
- Only Fools and Horses (Pearl)
- Rising Damp (Pearl)
- Sinbad (Pearl)
- Slinger's Day (Pearl)
- The Thin Blue Line (Pearl)
- UFO (Pearl)

=== Canadian Live-Action ===
- The Campbells (Pearl)
- Captain Power and the Soldiers of the Future (Pearl)
- Danger Bay (Pearl)
- The Doodlebops (Pearl)
- Falcon Beach 青春沙灘 (Pearl)
- Murdoch Mysteries (Pearl)
- Night Heat (Pearl)
- The Red Green Show (Pearl)
- Republic of Doyle 多伊爾共和國 (Pearl)
- Wingin' It 天使新人王 (Pearl)

=== Filipino Live-Action ===
- Juan dela Cruz (J2)

=== Indian Live-Action ===
- Mahabharat 摩訶婆羅多 (Jade)

=== Korean Live-Action ===
- Full House 浪漫滿屋 (Jade)
- Jewel in the Palace 大長今 (Jade)
- The Way of Medicine 醫道 (Jade)
- Scent of a Woman (Jade)

=== Taiwanese Live-Action ===
- Justice Pao

== Animation ==
=== Hong Kong cartoons ===
- The Adventures of Hello Kitty & Friends 愛漫遊
- The Legend of Condor Hero (卡通) 神鵰俠侶 (Parts I and II with 26 episodes each)
- My Life as McDull 麥兜故事
- Old Master Q 老夫子
- Professor Panda Says 成語動畫廊
- Xianqi Master

=== Japanese anime ===
- 21 Emon 21-宇宙
- Aikatsu! 星夢學園
- Alfred J. Kwak
- Animal Yokocho 動物橫町
- Appare-Ranman!
- Ashita no Nadja 妮嘉尋親記
- Astro Boy 小飛俠阿童木
- Atashin'chi 我們這一家
- Attack on Titan 進擊的巨人 (J2)
- Bakugan Battle Brawlers
- Battle B-Daman B傳說戰鬥彈珠人
- Battle Spirits series
- Black Jack 怪醫黑傑克
- Black Lagoon 黑礁
- Bleach 漂靈
- Blue Dragon 藍龍
- Bomberman Bom Bom 彈珠人
- Canaan 迦南 (J2)
- Captain Tsubasa 足球小將
- Cardcaptor Sakura 百變小櫻魔法卡
- Chibi Maruko-chan 櫻桃小丸子
- Chinpui 超級大耳鼠
- Chuka Ichiban 中華一番
- City Hunter 城市獵人
- Code Geass 叛逆的魯魯修
- Crayon Shin-chan 蜡笔小新
- Creamy Mami, the Magic Angel 小忌廉
- Crush Gear Turbo 激鬥戰車
- Cyborg Kuro-chan 超级小黑咪
- Death Note 死亡筆記
- Detective Conan 名偵探柯南
- Digimon series 數碼暴龍
- Doraemon 多啦A夢 (originally named 叮噹)
- Dr. Slump IQ博士
- Dragon Ball Z series 龍珠系列
- Duel Masters 決鬥大師
- Eden of the East 東之伊甸
- Esper Mami 超級力魔美
- Eyeshield 21 衝鋒21
- Evangelion 新世紀福音戰士 (Jade & HDJ)
- F
- Fables of the Green Forest
- Fairy Musketeers 俏皮劍俠小紅帽
- Fairy Tail 魔導少年
- Fighting Foodons 功夫小食神
- Full Moon wo Sagashite 尋找滿月
- Fullmetal Alchemist 鋼之鍊金術師
- Fushigi Yuugi 不思議游戲
- Fushigiboshi no Futagohime 雙子公主
- Galaxy Railways 銀河鐵道物語
- Game Center Arashi 電子神童
- GeGeGe no Kitaro
- Gin Tama 銀魂 (J2)
- Goldfish Warning! 娛樂金魚眼
- Gundam series 機動戰士高達系列
- Hamtaro 哈姆太郎
- Hans Christian Andersen
- Hayate no Gotoku 旋風管家
- Hungry Heart Wild Striker 野驁射手
- Hunter × Hunter 全職獵人
- InuYasha 犬夜叉
- Inazuma Eleven 閃電十一人
- Inazuma Eleven GO 閃電十一人GO
- Jewelpet series 寶石寵物
- K-On! 輕音少女 (J2)
- Kaibutsu Kun 怪物小王子
- Kaichou wa Maid-Sama! 會長是女僕大人! (J2)
- Kaitou Saint Tail 圣少女
- Kaleido Star 星夢美少女
- Kamichama Karin 小女神花铃
- Kamikaze Kaitou Jeanne 神風怪盜貞德
- Kirarin Revolution 花漾明星
- Kiteretsu Daihyakka 奇天烈大百科
- Kobato. 奇蹟少女KOBATO.
- Kuroshitsuji 黒執事 (J2)
- Madö King Granzört 魔動王
- Mahoujin Guru Guru 咕嚕咕嚕魔法陣
- Mama Loves the Poyopoyo-Saurus BB保你大
- Maple Town
- Maya the Honey Bee
- MegaMan NT Warrior series 網路英雄洛克人
- The Melancholy of Haruhi Suzumiya 涼宮春日的憂鬱 (J2)
- Mermaid Melody Pichi Pichi Pitch 唱K小魚仙
- Mirmo! 魔法小米路
- Mitsume ga Toru 三眼小子
- Mojacko 外星毛查查
- Moomin (1990)
- The Mythical Detective Loki Ragnarok 魔偵探洛基
- Nadia: The Secret of Blue Water 冒險少女娜汀亞
- Nana
- Naruto 火影忍者 (tvbQ)
- Neighborhood Story 近所物語
- Nichijou 日常 (J2)
- Nintama Rantarō 忍者亂太郎
- Ninja Hattori-Kun 忍者小靈精
- Obake no Q-tarō Q太郎
- Oh My Goddess! 幸運女神
- Ojamajo Doremi 小魔女Doremi
- Onegai My Melody 奇幻魔法Melody
- Onmyō Taisenki 陰陽大戰記
- Ouran High School Host Club 櫻蘭高校男公關部
- Pandora Hearts 潘多拉之心
- Parasol Henbē
- Patlabor 機動警察
- Perman 小超人帕門
- Pokémon 寵物小精靈 (Original Series through XY)
- Pretty Cure series 光之美少女系列
- Pro Golf Saru 高爾夫球手猿
- Ranma ½ 亂馬1/2
- Saber Marionette J to X
- Saber Rider and the Star Sheriffs
- Sailor Moon 美小女戰士
- Saiunkoku Monogatari 彩雲國物語
- Samurai Pizza Cats
- School Rumble 惡搞校園 (J2)
- Seven of Seven 七小花
- Sgt. Frog Keroro 軍曹
- Sherlock Hound
- Shugo Chara! 守護甜心
- Skip-Beat! 華麗的挑戰
- Slam Dunk 灌籃高手
- Sonic X 超音鼠X
- Special A 特优生
- Sugar Sugar Rune 魔界女王候補生
- Samurai Shodown Series 侍魂 (Pearl)
- Sword Art Online 刀劍神域 (J2)
- Tamagotchi! 寵物反斗星 (First series and the first four episodes of Yume Kira Dream Only)
- Taro the Space Alien 我的ET同學
- Tokyo Magnitude 8.0 東京地震8.0 (J2)
- Tokyo Mew Mew 東京喵喵
- Tonde Buurin 飛天小女豬事丁
- Tottemo! Luckyman 行運超人
- Tsubasa: Reservoir Chronicle 翼之奇幻旅程
- Ultra Maniac 魔法留学生
- Urusei Yatsura 山T女福星
- Vampire Knight 吸血鬼騎士 (J2)
- Viewtiful Joe 完美超人JOE
- Virtua Fighter
- Wedding Peach 婚紗小天使
- Working!! 無聊西餐廳 (J2)
- Wowser 零蛋多毛狗
- Yakitate!! Japan 日式面包王
- You're Under Arrest series 皇家雙妹嘜系列
- Yu Yu Hakusho 幽遊白書
- Yume no Crayon Oukoku 蠟筆小王國
- Zatch Bell!

=== American cartoons ===
- The 13 Ghosts of Scooby-Doo (Pearl)
- 101 Dalmatians: The Series (Pearl)
- 3-2-1 Penguins (Pearl)
- Action Man (1995) (Pearl)
- The Addams Family (1992) (Pearl)
- Adventures from the Book of Virtues (Pearl)
- The Adventures of Jimmy Neutron, Boy Genius (Pearl)
- The Adventures of Mickey and Donald (Pearl)
- The Adventures of Rocky and Bullwinkle and Friends (Pearl)
- The Adventures of Teddy Ruxpin (Pearl)
- Adventure Time (Pearl)
- Aladdin (Pearl)
- Alice's Wonderland Bakery (Pearl)
- Alienators: Evolution Continues (Pearl)
- The All New Popeye Hour (Pearl)
- The Amazing World of Gumball (Pearl)
- Amigo and Friends (Pearl)
- Amphibia (J2)
- Angela Anaconda (Pearl)
- The Angry Beavers (Pearl)
- Animaniacs (Pearl and Jade)
- Animated Tales of the World (Jade) 童心看世界
- The Archie and Sabrina Show (Pearl)
- Archie's TV Funnies (Pearl)
- Archie's Weird Mysteries (Pearl)
- The Astronut Show (Pearl)
- Avatar: The Last Airbender (Jade) 降世神通
- The Baby Huey Show (Pearl)
- Baby Looney Tunes (Pearl)
- Baby Shark's Big Show! (Pearl)
- Bratz
- The Backyardigans (Pearl)
- Batman of the Future (Pearl)
- Batman: The Animated Series (Pearl)
- The Batman (Pearl)
- Beetlejuice (Pearl)
- Ben 10 (Pearl)
- The Berenstain Bears (1985) (Pearl)
- Best Bugs Forever (Pearl)
- Betty Boop (Pearl)
- Big Guy and Rusty the Boy Robot (Pearl)
- Biker Mice from Mars (Pearl)
- Birdman and the Galaxy Trio (Pearl)
- The Biskitts (Pearl)
- Bobby's World (Pearl)
- Bubble Guppies (Pearl)
- Bump in the Night (Pearl)
- The Busy World of Richard Scarry (Pearl and Jade)
- Butch Cassidy and the Sundance Kids (Pearl)
- The California Raisin Show (Pearl)
- Camp Lazlo (Pearl)
- Capitol Critters (Pearl)
- Captain Caveman and the Teen Angels (Pearl)
- Captain Simian & the Space Monkeys (Pearl)
- Care Bears (Pearl)
- Casper and Friends (Pearl)
- Casper Classics (Pearl)
- CatDog (Pearl)
- Centurions (Pearl)
- Challenge of the GoBots (Pearl and Jade)
- The Charlie Brown and Snoopy Show (Pearl)
- Chip 'n Dale Rescue Rangers (Pearl and Jade) 小松鼠老友記
- Clue Club (Pearl)
- Courage the Cowardly Dog (Pearl)
- Curious George (2006) (Pearl)
- Daria (Pearl)
- Darkwing Duck (Pearl)
- Defenders of the Earth (Pearl)
- Dennis the Menace (1986) (Pearl)
- Denver, the Last Dinosaur (Pearl and Jade)
- Dexter's Laboratory (Pearl)
- Devlin (Pearl)
- Disney's Adventures of the Gummi Bears (Pearl)
- House of Mouse (Pearl)
- Dragon Flyz (Jade)
- DuckTales (1987) (Pearl and Jade)
- Dungeons & Dragons (Pearl - US version without English subtitles)
- Dynomutt, Dog Wonder (Pearl)
- Earthworm Jim (Pearl)
- Eek! The Cat (Pearl)
- Esme & Roy (Pearl)
- Family Dog (Pearl)
- Fangface (Pearl)
- The Fantastic Four (1967) (Pearl)
- Fantastic Four (1994) (Pearl)
- Fat Albert and the Cosby Kids (Pearl)
- Festival of Family Classics (Pearl)
- Firebuds (Pearl)
- Firehouse Tales (Pearl)
- The Flintstone Kids (Pearl)
- Foster's Home for Imaginary Friends (Pearl)
- Free Willy (Pearl)
- Frosty the Snowman (1969) (Jade - Christmas season only) 雪人FROSTY
- The Further Adventures of SuperTed (Pearl)
- Futurama (Pearl)
- Gadget Boy & Heather (Pearl)
- Gadget Boy's Adventures in History (Pearl)
- Galaxy High (Pearl and Jade)
- Garfield And Friends
- Gargoyles (Pearl)
- Gaspard & Lisa (Pearl)
- Geronimo Stilton (Pearl)
- The Get Along Gang (Pearl)
- Ghostbusters (1986) (Pearl)
- Goldie and Bear (Pearl)
- Gravity Falls (Pearl and Jade)
- The Great Grape Ape Show (Pearl)
- Gumby (Pearl)
- Gumby Adventures (Pearl)
- Happily Ever After: Fairy Tales for Every Child (Pearl)
- Heathcliff and the Catillac Cats (Pearl)
- Heckle & Jeckle (Pearl)
- Hello Kitty's Furry Tale Theater (Pearl)
- Hercules (1998) (Pearl)
- Heyyy, It's the King! (Pearl)
- Higglytown Heroes (Pearl)
- Hi Hi Puffy AmiYumi (Jade) 嗨嗨帕妃亞美由美
- How the Grinch Stole Christmas! (Pearl)
- Inch High, Private Eye (Pearl)
- Inspector Gadget (1983) (Pearl)
- Inspector Gadget's Field Trip (Pearl)
- Invader Zim (Pearl)
- Invasion America (Pearl)
- Iron Man (Pearl)
- Itsy Bitsy Spider (Pearl)
- Jabberjaw (Pearl)
- James Bond Jr. (Pearl)
- Jellystone! (Pearl)
- The Jetsons (Jade) 傑森一家
- Jumanji (Pearl)
- Justice League (Pearl)
- Kenny the Shark (Pearl)
- Ketchup Vampires (Pearl)
- The King Kong Show (Pearl)
- Laff-A-Lympics (Pearl)
- Lassie's Rescue Rangers (Pearl)
- Laurel and Hardy (Pearl)
- The Legend of Calamity Jane (Pearl)
- The Legend of Korra (Jade) 降世神通：寇拉傳奇
- The Little Mermaid (Pearl)
- The Littles (Pearl)
- Lloyd in Space (Pearl)
- Looney Tunes (Pearl)
- Lucky Luke (1983) (Pearl)
- Madeline (Pearl)
- Maxie's World (Pearl)
- Merrie Melodies (Pearl)
- The Merrie Melodies Show (Pearl)
- MGM Cartoon Classics (Pearl)
- Mickey Mouse (TV series) (Pearl)
- Mickey Mouse Clubhouse (Pearl)
- Mickey Mouse Funhouse (Pearl)
- Mighty Mouse: The New Adventures (Pearl)
- Monchhichis (Pearl)
- Mummies Alive! (Pearl)
- Muppet Babies (1984) (Pearl)
- My Friends Tigger & Pooh (Jade) 小熊維尼與跳跳虎
- My Gym Partner's a Monkey (Pearl)
- My Life as a Teenage Robot (Pearl)
- My Little Pony (Pearl)
- My Little Pony: Friendship Is Magic (Jade)
- Nature Cat (Pearl)
- New Wacky Races (Pearl)
- The New 3 Stooges (Pearl)
- The New Adventures of Madeline (Pearl)
- The New Adventures of Mighty Mouse and Heckle & Jeckle (Pearl)
- The New Adventures of Winnie the Pooh (Pearl and Jade)
- The New Archies (Pearl)
- New Kids on the Block (Pearl)
- The New Scooby and Scrappy-Doo Show (Pearl)
- The New Scooby-Doo Mysteries (Pearl)
- The Oddball Couple (Pearl)
- Wacky Races (1968) (Pearl)
- Oswald (Pearl)
- Paddington Bear (1989) (Pearl)
- Paw Paws (Pearl)
- Peabody's Improbable History (Pearl)
- Peanuts (Pearl)
- Peg + Cat (Pearl)
- The Penguins of Madagascar (Pearl)
- Penn Zero: Part-Time Hero (Jade) 潘恩·澤羅：兼職英雄
- Pepper Ann (Pearl)
- Phineas and Ferb (Pearl)
- Piggsburg Pigs! (Pearl)
- The Pink Panther (Pearl)
- Pinky and the Brain (Pearl)
- Pinky, Elmyra and the Brain (Pearl)
- Police Academy (Pearl)
- Popples (1986) (Pearl)
- Pound Puppies (1986) (Pearl)
- A Pup Named Scooby-Doo (Pearl)
- Quack Pack (Pearl)
- Quick Draw McGraw (Pearl)
- Rambo: The Force of Freedom (Pearl)
- Rainbow Brite (1984) (Pearl)
- The Real Ghostbusters (Pearl)
- Recess (Pearl)
- Richie Rich (1980) (Pearl)
- Ring Raiders (Pearl)
- Road Rovers (Pearl)
- Rocko's Modern Life (Pearl)
- Rod Rocket (Pearl)
- Rolie Polie Olie (Pearl)
- Rubik the Amazing Cube (Pearl)
- Rude Dog and the Dweebs (Pearl)
- Sabrina: The Animated Series (Pearl)
- Samurai Jack (Pearl)
- The Savage Dragon (Pearl)
- Sealab 2020 (Pearl)
- The Shnookums and Meat Funny Cartoon Show (Pearl)
- The Secret Lives of Waldo Kitty (Pearl)
- Secret Millionaires Club
- Sherlock Holmes in the 22nd Century (Pearl)
- She-Ra: Princess of Power (Pearl)
- Sid the Science Kid (Pearl)
- Sidney the Elephant (Pearl)
- SilverHawks (Pearl and Jade)
- The Simpsons (Jade & Pearl)
- Sitting Ducks (Pearl)
- Sky Commanders (Pearl)
- Slimer! And the Real Ghostbusters (Pearl)
- The Smurfs (1981) (Pearl and Jade) 藍精靈
- Snorks (Pearl)
- Sofia the First (Pearl)
- Sonic Underground (Pearl)
- Space Ghost (Pearl)
- Spider-Man (1994) (Pearl)
- The Spooktacular New Adventures of Casper (Pearl)
- Stanley (2001) (Pearl)
- Star vs. The Forces of Evil (J2)
- Star Wars: Clone Wars (2003) (Pearl)
- Street Sharks (Pearl)
- Stuart Little (Pearl)
- Super Friends (1973) (Pearl)
- Super Robot Monkey Team Hyperforce Go! (Jade) 超級機器人猴子隊超力去！
- Sylvester and Tweety Mysteries (Pearl)
- SWAT Kats: The Radical Squadron (Pearl and Jade) 霹靂特警貓
- T.O.T.S. (Pearl)
- TaleSpin (Pearl)
- Tarzan, Lord of the Jungle (Pearl)
- Teenage Mutant Ninja Turtles (1987) (Pearl and Jade) 龜之忍者
- Teen Titans (Pearl)
- Terrytoons (Pearl)
- Thomas Edison's Secret Lab (Pearl)
- ThunderCats (1985) (Pearl and Jade)
- ThunderCats (2011) (Pearl)
- Time Warp Trio (Pearl)
- Timeless Tales from Hallmark (Pearl)
- Tiny Toon Adventures (Pearl and Jade)
- The Tom and Jerry Comedy Show (Pearl)
- Tom and Jerry (Pearl - November 20, 1967-December 29, 1989)
- Toonsylvania (Pearl)
- The Transformers (Jade)
- True and the Rainbow Kingdom
- T.U.F.F. Puppy (Jade and J2)
- Ultimate Book of Spells (Pearl)
- VeggieTales (Pearl)
- The Wacky World of Tex Avery (Pearl)
- Walt Disney's Mickey and Donald (Pearl)
- Warner Bros. Cartoons (Pearl)
- What-a-Mess (Pearl)
- What's New Scooby-Doo? (Pearl)
- Where's Wally? (Pearl)
- Wild Kratts (Pearl)
- Will the Real Jerry Lewis Please Sit Down (Pearl)
- Wild West C.O.W.-Boys of Moo Mesa (Pearl)
- The Woody Woodpecker Show (Pearl)
- The Wuzzles (Pearl)
- X-Men: Evolution (Pearl)
- The Yogi Bear Show (Pearl)
- Yogi's Treasure Hunt (Pearl)
- Yo, Yogi! (Pearl)
- Zazoo U (Pearl)
- The Zeta Project (Pearl)
- ¡Mucha Lucha! (Pearl)

=== Australian cartoons ===
- Bananas in Pyjamas (CGI Series) (Pearl)
- The Berenstain Bears (1985) (Pearl)
- Berry Bees (Pearl)
- Bluey (Pearl)
- Bright Sparks (Pearl)
- Dennis and Gnasher (2009) (Pearl)
- The Greatest Tune on Earth (Pearl)
- Pearlie (Pearl)
- Sea Princesses (Pearl)
- Tabaluga (Pearl)

=== Belgian cartoons ===
- Ovide Video (Pearl)
- The Smurfs (1981) (Pearl and Jade) 藍精靈
- Snorks (Pearl)

=== Brazilian cartoons ===
- Doggy Day School (Pearl)
- Oswaldo (Pearl)
- Paper Port (Pearl)
- Sea Princesses (Pearl)

=== British cartoons ===
- 64 Zoo Lane (Pearl)
- The Adventures of Abney & Teal (Pearl)
- Albie (Pearl)
- Alias the Jester (Pearl)
- The Amazing World of Gumball (Pearl)
- Andy Pandy (Pearl)
- Angelina Ballerina 老鼠仔與芭蕾舞 (Pearl and Jade)
- The Animal Shelf (Pearl)
- The Animals of Farthing Wood (Pearl)
- Animated Tales of the World 童心看世界 (Jade)
- Avenger Penguins (Pearl)
- Bananaman (Pearl)
- Ben & Holly's Little Kingdom (Pearl)
- Best Bugs Forever (Pearl)
- The Big Knights (Pearl)
- Bimble's Bucket (Pearl)
- The Blunders (Pearl)
- Budgie the Little Helicopter (Jade)
- Captain Zed and the Zee Zone (Pearl)
- Charlie Chalk (Pearl)
- Chuggington (Pearl)
- City of Friends (Pearl)
- Cockleshell Bay (Pearl)
- Count Duckula (Pearl)
- The Cramp Twins (Pearl)
- Creepy Crawlies (Pearl)
- Dan Dare: Pilot of the Future (Pearl)
- Danger Mouse (2015) (Pearl)
- Dennis and Gnasher (2009) (Pearl)
- DinoCity (Pearl)
- Dino Babies (Pearl)
- Doris (Pearl)
- Dork Hunters from Outer Space (Pearl)
- The Dreamstone (Pearl and Jade)
- Famous 5: On the Case (Pearl)
- Fantomcat (Pearl)
- Fifi and the Flowertots (Pearl)
- The Further Adventures of SuperTed (Pearl)
- Gaspard & Lisa (Pearl)
- Get Squiggling (Pearl)
- Grizzly Tales for Gruesome Kids (Pearl)
- Hana's Helpline
- Hey Duggee (Pearl)
- Hilltop Hospital (Pearl)
- Humf (Pearl)
- Jimbo and the Jet-Set (Pearl)
- JoJo & Gran Gran (Pearl)
- King Rollo 廣東話配音 (Jade)
- The Large Family (Pearl)
- Make Way for Noddy 小司機Noddy (Pearl and Jade)
- Maisy (Pearl)
- Mike the Knight (Pearl)
- Molly's Gang (Pearl)
- Noah's Island (Pearl)
- Noddy (Pearl)
- Noddy's Toyland Adventures (Pearl)
- Pablo the Little Red Fox (Pearl)
- The Perishers (Pearl)
- Poddington Peas (Pearl)
- The Pondles (Pearl)
- Olive the Ostrich (Pearl)
- Olivia (Pearl)
- Olly the Little White Van (Pearl)
- Operavox: The Animated Operas (Pearl)
- Paddington Bear (Pearl)
- Peppa Pig (Pearl)
- Pigeon Street (Pearl)
- The Pondles (Pearl)
- Roary the Racing Car (Pearl)
- Rotten Ralph (Pearl)
- Rubbadubbers (Pearl)
- School of Roars (Pearl)
- Sea Princesses (Pearl)
- The Secret Show (Pearl)
- Shakespeare: The Animated Tales (Pearl)
- Shaun the Sheep 超級無敵羊咩咩 (Pearl)
- Sherlock Holmes in the 22nd Century (Pearl)
- The Shoe People (Pearl and Jade)
- Simon in the Land of Chalk Drawings (Pearl)
- Sooty's Amazing Adventures (Pearl)
- Supertato (Pearl)
- Tales of Little Grey Rabbit (Pearl)
- The Three Friends and Jerry (Pearl)
- Thomas & Friends (Pearl)
- Tilly and Friends (Pearl)
- Timmy Time (Pearl)
- Tinga Tinga Tales
- Tiny Planets (Pearl)
- Tree Fu Tom (Pearl)
- The Twins (Pearl)
- Where's Wally? (Pearl)
- Wilf the Witch's Dog (Pearl)
- William's Wish Wellingtons (Pearl)
- Willo the Wisp (Pearl)
- The Wind in the Willows (Pearl)
- The World of Peter Rabbit and Friends (Pearl)
- Yakka Dee! (Pearl)

=== Canadian cartoons ===
- The Adventures of Teddy Ruxpin (Pearl)
- The Amazing Spiez! (Pearl)
- Angela Anaconda (Pearl)
- Atomic Betty (Pearl and Jade) 原子貝蒂
- Babar and the Adventures of Badou (Pearl)
- The Backyardigans (Pearl)
- Beetlejuice (Pearl)
- The Berenstain Bears (2002) (Pearl)
- Braceface (Pearl)
- The Busy World of Richard Scarry (Pearl and Jade)
- C.L.Y.D.E. (Pearl)
- Care Bears (Pearl)
- The Cramp Twins (Pearl)
- Creepschool (Pearl)
- Cybersix (Jade & HDJ)
- Doggy Day School (Pearl)
- Eckhart (Pearl)
- Eek! the Cat (Pearl)
- Family Dog (Pearl)
- Franklin and Friends (Pearl)
- Free Willy (Pearl)
- Flying Rhino Junior High (Pearl)
- George Shrinks (Pearl)
- Inspector Gadget (1983) (Pearl)
- Inuk (Pearl)
- Jacob Two-Two (Pearl)
- Kaput and Zösky (Pearl)
- Kid vs. Kat (J2) 男孩和冤家貓
- King
- Lilly the Witch (Pearl)
- Madeline (Pearl)
- Mike the Knight (Pearl)
- Miss Spider's Sunny Patch Friends (Pearl)
- Mona the Vampire (Pearl)
- Monster Buster Club (Pearl)
- Mudpit (Pearl)
- My Friend Rabbit (Pearl)
- My Little Pony: Friendship Is Magic (Jade)
- Oh No! It's an Alien Invasion (Pearl)
- Oswaldo (Pearl)
- Ovide Video (Pearl)
- Pearlie (Pearl)
- Peg + Cat (Pearl)
- Polly Pocket (Pearl)
- The Raccoons (Pearl)
- ReBoot (Jade)
- Rolie Polie Olie (Pearl)
- Sagwa, the Chinese Siamese Cat (Jade) 傻瓜貓
- Sharky & George (Pearl)
- The Smoggies (Pearl and Jade) 大自然環保寶
- Stickin' Around (Pearl)
- Street Sharks (Pearl)
- Toot and Puddle
- True and the Rainbow Kingdom
- The Twins (Pearl)
- Ultimate Book of Spells (Pearl)
- What's with Andy? (Pearl)

=== Chilean cartoons ===
- 31 minutos
- Ozie Boo!: Save The Planet
- Zumbastico Fantastico
- Con Que Suenas
- La tortuga Taruga
- Paper Port (Pearl)
- Pulentos

=== Dutch cartoons ===
- Alfred J. Kwak (Jade)
- The Bluffers (Pearl)
- Miffy (Pearl)
- Moomin (1990) (Jade)
- Star Street: The Adventures of the Star Kids (Jade)
- Wowser (Jade) 零蛋多毛狗

=== Finnish cartoons ===
- The Hydronauts (Pearl)
- Moomin (1990) (Jade)

=== French cartoons ===
- 64 Zoo Lane (Pearl)
- The Amazing Spiez! (Pearl)
- Angelo Rules (Pearl)
- The Animals of Farthing Wood (Pearl)
- Babar and the Adventures of Badou (Pearl)
- Barbapapa (Pearl)
- Best Bugs Forever (Pearl)
- The Busy World of Richard Scarry (Pearl and Jade)
- C.L.Y.D.E. (Pearl)
- Clémentine (Pearl)
- Code Lyoko (Pearl)
- Colargol (Jade) 小熊杰里米
- Creepschool (Pearl)
- Dragon Flyz (Jade)
- Famous 5: On the Case (Pearl)
- Flying Rhino Junior High (Pearl)
- Gadget Boy & Heather (Pearl)
- Gaspard & Lisa (Pearl)
- Gawayn (Jade)
- Geronimo Stilton (Pearl)
- The Get Along Gang (Pearl)
- Grizzy & the Lemmings (Pearl) 大笨熊與吱吱鼠
- Dennis the Menace (1986) (Pearl)
- Denver, the Last Dinosaur (Pearl and Jade)
- Heathcliff and the Catillac Cats (1984) (Pearl)
- Hilltop Hospital (Pearl)
- The Hydronauts (Pearl)
- Inspector Gadget (1983) (Pearl)
- Inuk (Pearl)
- Kaput & Zösky (Pearl)
- The Large Family (Pearl)
- The Legend of Calamity Jane (Pearl)
- The Littles (Pearl)
- Lucky Luke (Pearl)
- Madeline (Pearl)
- Moka's Fabulous Adventures! (Pearl)
- Mona the Vampire (Pearl)
- Monster Buster Club (Pearl)
- Mummy Nanny (Pearl)
- Nate Is Late (Pearl)
- Nick & Perry (Pearl)
- Oggy and the Cockroaches (Pearl)
- Once Upon a Time... Life
- Once Upon a Time... The Explorers
- Oscar's Oasis (Pearl)
- Pablo the Little Red Fox (Pearl)
- Pirate Family (Pearl)
- Popples (1986) (Pearl)
- Robotboy (Jade)
- Rolie Polie Olie (Pearl)
- Rolling with the Ronks! (Pearl)
- Sharky & George (Pearl)
- The Smoggies (Pearl and Jade) 大自然環保寶
- Space Goofs (Pearl)
- Spartakus and the Sun Beneath the Sea (Pearl)
- Tales of Tatonka
- Talis and the Thousand Tasks (Pearl)
- Titeuf (Pearl)
- Trust Me, I'm a Genie (Pearl)
- What's with Andy? (Pearl)
- Zig & Sharko (Pearl)

=== German cartoons ===
- Best Bugs Forever (Pearl)
- Bill Body: Crazy World of Sports (Pearl)
- Dork Hunters from Outer Space (Pearl)
- The Hydronauts (Pearl)
- Lilly the Witch (Pearl)
- Lisa (Pearl)
- Lucky Luke (Pearl)
- Maya the Honey Bee (Pearl)
- Mummy Nanny (Pearl)
- Nick & Perry (Pearl)
- Pirate Family (Pearl)
- Tabaluga (Pearl)
- Talis and the Thousand Tasks (Pearl)
- The Three Friends and Jerry (Pearl)

=== Chinese cartoons ===
- The Olympic Adventures of Fuwa 福娃奧運漫遊記

=== Korean cartoons ===
- Baby Shark's Big Show! (Pearl)
- Oscar's Oasis (Pearl)
- Pororo the Little Penguin (Jade) 冰鎮企鵝仔
- Restol, The Special Rescue Squad
- Tai Chi Chasers (Jade) 太極千字文

=== Indian cartoons ===
- Berry Bees (Pearl)
- Motu Patlu (Jade) 摩都伯德祿
- Oswaldo (Pearl)
- Raju the Rickshaw (Pearl)

=== Italian cartoons ===
- Berry Bees (Pearl)
- Geronimo Stilton (Pearl)
- Sherlock Hound (Jade)
- Winx Club (Jade) 魔法學園

=== Irish cartoons ===
- The Amazing World of Gumball (Pearl)
- Berry Bees (Pearl)
- Dino Babies (Pearl)
- Lilly the Witch (Pearl)
- Lily's Driftwood Bay (Pearl)
- Pic Me (Pearl)
- Skunk Fu! (Jade) 功夫臭鼬

=== Japanese cartoons (Non-anime) ===
- Galaxy High
- The Littles

|ThunderCats (1985)

- Timberwood Tales
- The Transformers

=== Kenyan cartoons ===
- Tinga Tinga Tales

=== Malaysian cartoons ===
- BoBoiBoy on Pearl (Pearl; March 16, 2011-August 21, 2016)
- BoBoiBoy Galaxy (Pearl; December 20, 2016-present)

=== Mexican cartoons ===
- Amigo and Friends

=== New Zealand cartoons ===
- Oscar and Friends (Pearl)

=== Russian cartoons ===
- Animated Tales of the World 童心看世界 (Jade)
- DinoCity (Pearl)
- Kid-E-Cats (Pearl)
- Kikoriki 爆趣科學Pin碼 (Jade)
- Masha and the Bear (Pearl)

=== Scottish cartoons ===
- Animated Tales of the World 童心看世界 (Jade)

=== Spanish cartoons ===
- Animated Tales of the World 童心看世界 (Jade)
- Sea Princesses (Pearl)
- The Cobi Troupe 高比 (Jade)
- Mort and Phil (Jade)

=== Swedish cartoons ===
- Creepschool (Pearl)
- Lisa (Pearl)
- Moomin (1990) (Jade)
- The Three Friends and Jerry (Pearl)

=== Swiss cartoons ===
- Bill Body: Crazy World of Sports (Pearl)

=== Welsh cartoons ===
- Animated Tales of the World 童心看世界 (Jade)
- The Further Adventures of SuperTed (Pearl)
- Hana's Helpline
- Operavox: The Animated Operas (Pearl)
- Shakespeare: The Animated Tales (Pearl)

== Jamboree shows ==
=== TV charity shows ===
- Gala Spectacular 星光熠熠耀保良 - a charity show for Po Leung Kuk, shown in September every year
- Golden Star Anniversary
- Pok Oi Charity Show 博愛歡樂傳萬家 - a charity show for Pok Oi Hospitals' Group, shown in March every year
- SuperStar Charity Concert
- Tung Wah Charity Show 歡樂滿東華 - a charity show for Tung Wah Group of Hospitals, shown in December every year
- TVB Benefit Variety show for New York University (NYU) Downtown Hospital - New York, USA
- Yan Chai Charity Show 慈善星輝仁濟夜 - a charity show for Yan Chai Hospitals' Group, shown in January every year

=== Major jamboree shows ===
- TVB All Star Challenge 星光熠熠勁爭輝
- TVB Anniversary Awards 萬千星輝頒獎典禮 - an awards show celebrating the year's best in TVB programming. Hosted by Carol Cheng.
- TVB Anniversary Special 萬千星輝賀台慶 - a show celebrating the establishment of TVB, shown on November 19 each year
- Miss Chinese International Pageant 國際中華小姐競選 - an annual beauty pageant with delegates of Chinese descent from around the world competing for the title of Miss Chinese International
- Miss Hong Kong Pageant 香港小姐競選 - an annual beauty pageant that crowns Miss Hong Kong, who will then represent Hong Kong to compete in Miss World and Miss Chinese International
- Mr. Hong Kong Contest 香港先生選舉 - the male counterpart of Miss Hong Kong, this contest chooses a male contestant to crown as Mr. Hong Kong
- New Talent Singing Awards International Finals 全球華人新秀歌唱大賽 - an annual singing contest with contestants around the world vying for first place to win a record contract. Hosted by Carol Cheng.

=== Variety shows ===
- Beautiful Cooking (2006)
- Enjoy Yourself Tonight (E.Y.T.) 歡樂今宵 (1967)
- Super Trio Series 獎門人系列 - long running game show since 1994. Hosted by Eric Tsang, Jerry Lamb (Season 1-7), Jordan Chan (first season only) and Chin Kar-lok (second season onwards). The eighth season had Jerry Lamb replaced by Wong Cho Lam and Louis Yuen, because he went to seek a career opportunity at a rival network, CTV Atlantic.

=== Game shows ===
- Weakest Link 一筆 OUT 消 - Cantonese version of the quiz programme asking general knowledge questions to participants, with their majority evicting themselves out one by one until two are left to answer questions, determining who's the winner out of the two; hosted by Carol Cheng.
- Minutes to Fame 殘酷一叮 - a game show that give time to the participants for their show; the longer time they keep, the more chance to win. This game is similar to Pop Idol and American Idol and is hosted by Hacken Lee and Joey Leung.
- Justice For All 百法百眾 - a game show that gives two documents about the laws of Hong Kong to the participants, and ask them questions about the document; they can choose in two answers. Hosted by Carol Cheng.
- 15/16
- Deal or No Deal 一擲千金
- Identity 亮相
- Are You Smarter Than a 5th Grader? 係咪小兒科 (2008)
- Outsmart 財智達人 - a game show that shoot with high-definition technology. Hosted by Carol Cheng.(2009、2012)
- Checkerboard Jackpot 逐格鬥 - a game show that shoot with high-definition technology. Hosted by Carol Cheng.(2010)
- The Law Society of Hong Kong Law Week Specials 知法守法 - a game show that shoot with high-definition technology, content surrounding the laws of Hong Kong. Hosted by Carol Cheng.(2011)
- Treasure Hunt At Double Cove 迎海尋珍奪寶 - a game show that shoot with high-definition technology. Hosted by Carol Cheng.(2012)

== News programmes ==
- Hong Kong and World News
  - Good Morning Hong Kong (香港早晨) at TVB Jade
  - Noon News (午間新聞) at TVB Jade
  - News at 6:30 (六點半新聞報道) at TVB Jade
  - News at 7:30 (七點半新聞報道) at TVB Pearl
  - News File (新聞簡報) at TVB Jade & TVB Pearl (1981 - 1993)
  - News Roundup (晚間新聞) at TVB Jade & TVB Pearl
  - Putonghua News (普通話新聞報道) at TVB Pearl (1993 - 2016) and TVB J5 (2016 - Present)
- World Animation Magazine 世界動畫雜誌 World Animation and Cartoon News Report outlook (TVB Pearl)
- The Pearl Report 明珠檔案
- Global Watch 財經多國度
- Market Open 開市第一擊
- Pearl News Magazine 國際視線
- Finance Magazine 財經透視 (TVB Jade)
- Money Magazine 財經雜誌 - Hong Kong and world financial news report outlook (TVB Pearl)
- Sunday Report 星期日檔案 - features stories from Chinese and Hong Kong societies affecting people today
- News Magazine 新聞透視 - Hong Kong political news round table

== Information programmes ==
- Be My Guest 志雲飯局 (2006)
- Dolce Vita 港生活‧港享受 (2006)
- Hong Kong Live 香港直播
- Pleasure and Leisure
- So Good
- Vanishing Glacier
- Big Big World (2013)

== Sports programmes ==
- CFL on TVB
- MLB on TVB
- MLS on TVB
- NBA on TVB
- NFL on TVB
- NHL on TVB
- Summer Olympic Games (1984-)
- Winter Olympic Games (1984, 2014-)
- Sports World 體育世界 (1980-2018)
- FIFA World Cup (1980-2006, 2014)
- Macau Grand Prix at TVB Jade & formerly TVB Pearl (1967-)

== Entertainment programmes ==
Discontinued/cancelled programmes

- Entertainment News Watch 娛樂新聞眼
- Jade Starbiz 娛樂大搜查
- K-100

Currently on-air programmes

- E-Buzz 娛樂 直播
- Scoop 東張西望

== Music shows ==
- 360 Boundless Music (360° 音樂無邊)
- Children's Song Awards Presentation (兒歌金曲頒獎典禮)
- Children's Song Corner (兒歌通訊站)
- Global Rhythm (無間音樂)
- Gold Disc Awards Presentation (金唱片頒獎典禮) - awards the top 30 selling gold and platinum artists, according to sales figures
- Jade Solid Gold (勁歌金曲) - features live performances from various artists and the countdown of the top 25 or 20 albums sold during the week
- Jade Solid Gold Best Ten Music Awards Presentation (十大勁歌金曲頒獎典禮)
- Jade Solid Gold Song Video Corner (金曲挑戰站) - features music videos from various artists' top-selling albums and/or singles
- Minutes to Fame - a show where people sing to get money; they can get HK$100 every second
- Music@GIV (音樂潮@giv) - music videos, live performance from various artist and viewer shoutouts and feedback in a half-hour live programme
- Ultimate Jade Solid Gold (勁歌推介) - features the best music videos of the best top-selling albums and/or singles
- The Voice (超級巨聲) - a reality show type singing competition that eliminates contestants slowly until a winner is declared at the end of each season
- Asia Super Young (亞洲超星團) - a reality show type group competition that eliminates contestants slowly until a winner is declared at the end of season

== Children's programmes ==
- 100 Deeds for Eddie McDowd
- 3-2-1 Contact
- 430 Shuttle 430 穿梭機
- Ace Lightning
- The Adventures of Rupert Bear
- Agent Z and the Penguin from Mars
- After School ICU 放學ICU
- Animals in Action
- Art Attack
- Aquila
- Barney & Friends
- Beakman's World
- Big Bag
- The Big Bang
- Big John, Little John
- Big Kids
- Bill Nye the Science Guy
- Bits and Bytes
- The Box of Delights
- Boy Dominic
- The Boy from Andromeda
- The Boy Merlin
- Button Moon
- Catweazle
- The Children of Green Knowe
- Children of the Dog Star
- Chocky
- Chocky's Challenge
- Chocky's Children
- C.A.B.
- DaDa DeDe Melody DaDa DeDe 精靈樂園
- DaDa DeDe Petit Chefs DaDa DeDe 小名廚
- Dinosaur Detectives
- Dodger, Bonzo and the Rest
- Don't Eat the Neighbours
- Do It
- Dramarama
- The Edison Twins
- The Electric Company
- Fimbles
- Finger Tips
- Flash Fax 閃電傳真機
- The Genie from Down Under
- The Giblet Boys
- Ginger Gap
- Ghostwriter
- The Ghost of Faffner Hall
- Gophers!
- Hannah Montana
- Here Comes Mumfie
- Hero to Zero
- The Hoobs
- Iconicles
- It's a Big Big World
- Jack's Big Music Show
- Jackanory Junior
- The Jersey
- Jim Henson's Mother Goose Stories
- Kids Click 至NET小人類
- The Kids of Degrassi Street
- Kidsongs
- Korg: 70,000 B.C.
- Lassie
- Little Sir Nicholas
- Lizzie McGuire
- The Longhouse Tales
- The Magician's House
- The New Mickey Mouse Club
- Mike and Angelo
- Moondial
- Monster Squad
- Mousercise
- Munch Bunch
- My Animal and Me
- My Best Friend is an Alien
- Nina and the Neurons
- The New Ghostwriter Mysteries
- The New Mickey Mouse Club
- Nobody's Hero
- Nobody's House
- The Noddy Shop
- Old MacDonald's Sing-A-Long Farm
- The Paper Lads
- Patrick's Planet
- Pollyanna
- Pullover
- Rentaghost
- The Return of the Psammead
- Rod, Jane and Freddy
- The Roly Mo Show
- Round the Twist
- Scheewe Art Workshop
- Sea Urchins
- The Secret World of Alex Mack
- The Secrets of Isis
- Secrets of the Animal Kingdom
- Serious Amazon
- Serious Desert
- Serious Jungle
- Sesame English
- Sesame Park
- Sesame Street
- Shazam!
- Show Me Show Me
- Sky Trackers
- Sooty & Co.
- Soy Luna
- The Sooty Show
- Splash
- Square One Television
- Stig of the Dump
- The Suite Life of Zack & Cody
- Super Gran
- Swallows and Amazons Forever!
- Teletubbies
- That's So Raven
- Think Big天地
- Tikkabilla
- Tommy Zoom
- The Tomorrow People
- Topo Gigio
- Tricky Business
- Tweenies
- T-Bag
- Under the Mountain
- Violetta 音樂情人夢 (Pearl, dubbed in English with Mandarin Subtitles)
- The Wild House
- Winx Club
- Wonderstruck
- Wumpa's World 沃帕的世界
- Young Universe
- Zach's Ultimate Guide
- Zap Rap (Pearl, early 1990s)

== Films ==
=== American films ===
- The Chipmunk Adventure (Pearl)
- Barbie in the Nutcracker (Pearl)
- Cool as Ice (Pearl)
- Death Wish II (Pearl)
- Dennis the Menace (Pearl)
- Die Hard (Pearl)
- Dumbo (Pearl)
- High Spirits (Pearl)
- Home for the Holidays (Pearl)
- How to Train Your Dragon (Jade)
- Indiana Jones and the Temple of Doom (Pearl)
- A Kid in King Arthur's Court (Pearl)
- A League of Their Own (Pearl)
- Money Train (Pearl)
- The Nightmare Before Christmas (Pearl)
- Perry Mason film series (Pearl)
- Race for Your Life, Charlie Brown (Pearl)
- Rock-a-Doodle (Pearl)
- Royal Wedding (Pearl)
- There Will Be Blood (Pearl)
- Star Trek III: The Search for Spock (Pearl)
- Star Wars film series (Jade)
- The White Buffalo (Pearl)
- Who Framed Roger Rabbit (Pearl)
- Wreck-It Ralph (Pearl)

=== Australian films ===
- Crocodile Dundee (Pearl)
- Dot and the Bunny (Pearl)
- Dot and the Kangaroo (Pearl)
- Mad Max (Pearl)
- Mad Max Beyond Thunderdome (Pearl)
- Mad Max 2 (Pearl)

=== British films ===
- High Spirits (Pearl)
- Thunderbirds Are Go (Pearl)

=== Canadian films ===
- Barbie in the Nutcracker (Pearl)
- Strange Brew (Pearl)

=== Irish films ===
- High Spirits (Pearl)

=== Japanese films ===
- Doraemon film series (Jade)
- Final Fantasy: The Spirits Within 最終幻想：太空戰士 (Jade)
- Studio Ghibli film series (Jade)

=== Malaysian films ===
- BoBoiBoy: The Movie (Pearl; August 27, 2016-present on some days or months)
