= Lucky Luke (disambiguation) =

Lucky Luke is a Belgian comic book series that began in 1946.

Lucky Luke may also refer to the following adaptations of the series:

- Lucky Luke (1984 TV series), an animated television series starring William Callaway
- Lucky Luke (1991 TV series), an animated television series, consisting of 26 episodes
- Lucky Luke (1991 film), an Italian film adaptation starring Terence Hill
  - Lucky Luke (1992 TV series), an Italian television series based on the film, starring Terence Hill
- The New Adventures of Lucky Luke, an animated television series, consisting of 52 episodes
  - Go West! A Lucky Luke Adventure, an animated film adaptation based on the television series
- Lucky Luke (2009 film), a French/Argentine film adaptation starring Jean Dujardin
- Lucky Luke, the name of several video games based on the character; see Lucky Luke § Video games
