= Television drama (disambiguation) =

A television drama is a television genre.

Television drama or TV drama may also refer to:

- Arab television drama
- Chinese television drama
- Hong Kong television drama
- Indian television drama
- Japanese television drama
- Korean television drama
- Philippine television drama
- Turkish television drama
