= From Hand to Art =

- 手造成
- Genre: Lifestyle
- Written by: Liang Jian Heng (梁儉恆)
- Presented by: Sarah Song, Amigo Choi, Leung Ka Ki
- Original language: Cantonese
- No. of episodes: 18

Production
- Producer: Zhang Yong Shan (張穎珊)
- Production company: Television Broadcasts Limited (TVB)

Original release
- Network: TVB Jade
- Release: 30 September 2012 – 17 February 2013

From Hand to Art (Chinese: 一手造成) is a Hong Kong lifestyle television program produced by Television Broadcasts Limited (TVB). It was created by TVB programme producer Liang Jian Heng 梁儉恆) and Zhang Ying Shan (張穎珊). The programme was first showed on 30 September 2012, and ended on 17 February 2013, on TVB Jade. It was broadcast on every Sunday at 7 pm, 30 minutes each. A total of 18 episodes were aired.

From Hand to Art was themed on traditional handicrafts in Hong Kong. It was hosted by TVB artists Sarah Song, Amigo Choi and Leung Ka Ki. In each episode, two hosts visited and interviewed experts of traditional handicrafts such as Shanghai barber Tao and Gao, wooden puppet master Choi, and Qipao tailor Liu. While listening to the stories of old Hong Kong, the hosts learnt how to make the handicrafts.

== Episode guide ==
Episode	Date	Handicrafts
1. Under The Full Moon (Mid-Autumn Festival special)	30 September 2012	Traditional paper lanterns and piglets shaped pastries
2. In The Mood for Love	7 October 2012	Qipao (Chinese long dress for women)
3. The Art of Shanghai Berbers	14 October 2012	Shanghai style haircut services
4. Heritage	21 October 2012	Bamboo steamers, leather shoes
5. To Draw a Rainbow	28 October 2012	Chinese wooden furniture carving and painting
6. Carve With Care	4 November 2012	Puppet carving and controlling the strings
7. The Puppet Show	11 November 2012	Wood puppet carving and strings controlling
8. Tailor-Made in Hong Kong	18 November 2012	Tailor-made suits, cotton quilts, and bamboo mats sewing
9. Playing with Papers	9 December 2012	Paper tearing, paper cutting, and paper folding
10. Capturing the breeze	16 December 2012	Handmade kites, photo staining
11. the Amazing Shadow Play	23 December 2012	The crops and the techniques of shadow play
12. A Second Life for old treasures	6 January 2013	Sewing clothes, repairing umbrellas and old pots
13. It's All about Wood	13 January 2013	Wooden carts, Erhu
14. Commemorating Gods and Ancestors	20 January 2013	Sweet dumplings for worship, ancestral tablet carving
15. Hard and Soft Wisdom	27 January 2013	Ferroalloy mailbox forging, stained pottery
16. Flower and Flour	3 February 2013	Chinese style funeral flower baskets, flour dolls
17. Golden Lions in CNY	10 February 2013	Lion heads, face threading
18. The Grand Finale	17 February 2013	Big head, fishery

== Critics ==
From Hand to Art received support from audiences and positive reviews in online forums. Online commenters praised the programme as being "meaningful" and they did learn more about local handicrafts. Some said the programme successfully aroused arouse public's interest in traditional handicrafts such as paper crafts, carvings, shadow plays and cheongsam (qipao), while others felt sorry for the sunset of these beautiful arts due to scarce successors. Moreover, audiences admired the lifelong devotion of the art masters to their works. One forum user even asked for the address and contact number of Master Wong, a sewing master featured in episode 12.

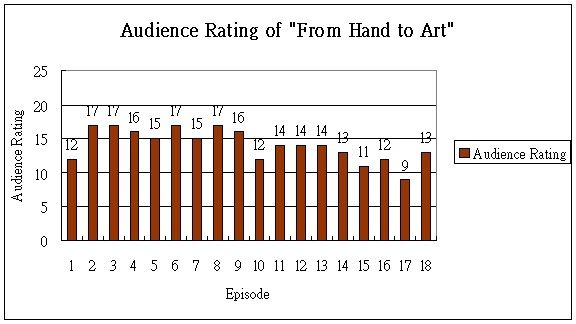

== See also ==
List of Hong Kong television series
