= Lucky Luke (1991 TV series) =

- Series poster
- Genre: Western; Adventure; Comedy; Action
- Based on: Lucky Luke by: Morris; René Goscinny; Xavier Fauche; Jean Léturgie; Lo Hartog van Banda
- Written by: Philippe Landrot; Alain de Lannoy; Xavier Fauche; Jean Léturgie; Elisabeth Bazerli; Gilberte Goscinny
- Directed by: Philippe Landrot; Morris
- Composer: Claude Bolling
- Country of origin: Belgium
- Original language: French
- No. of seasons: 1
- No. of episodes: 26

Production
- Executive producers: Bruno-René Huchez; Hélène Fatou
- Running time: 25 minutes
- Production companies: Dargaud; IDDH; FR3

Original release
- Network: FR3
- Release: 15 September 1991 – 8 March 1992

Related
- Lucky Luke (1984); The New Adventures of Lucky Luke

Lucky Luke is a Belgian animated television series based on the comic book series of the same name created by Belgian cartoonist Morris.

== Synopsis ==
The series adapts some adventures from the Belgian comic series Lucky Luke.

== Credits ==
- Director: Philippe Landrot, Morris
- Screenplay: Philippe Landrot, Alain de Lannoy, Xavier Fauche, Jean Léturgie, Elisabeth Bazerli and Gilberte Goscinny, based on the comic strip Lucky Luke by Morris, René Goscinny, Xavier Fauche, Jean Léturgie and Lo Hartog van Banda
- Storyboards: Philippe Landrot, Christian Lignan, Pierre Watrin and Alain de Lannoy
- Set design: Bernard Fiévé
- Music: Claude Bolling
- Executive producer: Bruno-René Huchez, Hélène Fatou

== Production ==
Eight years after the first Lucky Luke series, his second television series arrives on French screens. It does not benefit from a prime-time access broadcast (19:55 p.m.) and gets a broadcast slot on Sunday afternoon. The broadcast schedule and the lack of media coverage (unlike the first series) may partly explain its relative anonymity. For their part, following the failure of the first series on American television networks, Hanna-Barbera refused to produce the second series. Dargaud then entrusted the project to IDDH, an audiovisual company located in Angoulême. Morris made the model sheets while Philippe Landrot directs the end credits (who is already the director of the opening credits since the first series). The latter as well as the writers of the series in albums (Xavier Fauche, Jean Léturgie, Lo Hartog van Banda) ensure the adaptation validated by Morris and Gilberte Goscinny.

The series consists of episodes from the albums not adapted in the first series, (The Judge, Tortillas for the Daltons, The Ghost Town, etc.) and short stories to which have added new scripted material (The Alibi, Dangerous Passage and The Battle of the Rice). One episode even converges two different short stories (Challenge to Lucky Luke and Wyatt Earp's Equal). On the voice cast side, Jacques Thébault reprises the role of Lucky Luke from the previous series, as well as Pierre Tornado as the role of Averell Dalton which would also be his final time voicing the character that he had previously played for each animated adaptation. The rest of the cast has however been completely new and many recurring characters would change voices throughout the series (even Pierre Tornade would be replaced by another actor imitating his voice for a short line of Averell in Fingers), sometimes within the same episode. Claude Bolling provides the instrumental credits of the beginning and reuses some musical commas. He also reuses his own music from the first two Lucky Luke feature films.

Due to the departure of Hanna-Barbera from production, Lucky Luke finds himself, in this series, free from all the constraints imposed by American television for the first series. Ethnic minorities are back, placed in their historical context. At the same time, we find between the characters the same balance as in the albums: Jolly Jumper and Rantanplan intervene much more rarely. However, Lucky Luke still doesn't smoke (only an allusion to his past as a smoker is present in the episode The Alibi).

The official order of the episodes has some inconsistencies, especially concerning the characters supposed to have met for the first time by Lucky Luke during the episode Canyon Apache, while he already knows them in The Peddler. In France, the series was broadcast for the first time on September 15, 1991 on FR3, then rebroadcast on the same channel on June 7, 1992. In Quebec, it was broadcast on December 1, 1993 on the Super Écran channel.

The series has often been labeled as season 2 of the 1984 series.

Ten years after the creation of this second series, a third appears under the title The New Adventures of Lucky Luke produced by the company Xilam in 2001. The voice of Lucky Luke would then be attributed to Antoine de Caunes.

== Voice cast ==
=== French ===
- Jacques Thébault as Lucky Luke
- Bernard Demory as Jolly Jumper, Rantanplan, Pete the Undecided, Bill the Cheater, Omer Marshmallow, Horace Greely, Jonathan, Arthur Caille, Fingers
- Patrice Baudrier as Joe Dalton, Bad Ticket, Colonel McStraggle, Ted Ballast, Elliot Belt, Tea Spoon, William Jarrett, Colonel O'Nolan (episode 12), Patronimo (episode 14), Pat Poker, Bad Ticket, J.J.J.J.Jr., Bill Sparrow, Rattlesnake Joe, Adolphe Caille, Bart
- Michel Tugot-Doris as William Dalton (replacement voice), Jack le Muscle, Emilio Espuelas, W.H. Russel, Handy O'Toole, Badlot, Baby Crumbs, Fenweek, Jupiter, Pedro Cucaracha, Zilch, Milton
- Olivier Hémon as Jack Dalton, Hank Bully, Denver Miles, Flood, Joe L'Indien, Patronimo (episode 12), Thirsty Bear, Texas Killer, Grison
- Pierre Tornade as Averell Dalton, Bronco Fortworth
- Henri Labussière as Mathias Bones, Powell, Jerry Grindstone, Judge Roy Bean, Colonel O'Nolan (episode 14), J. S. Chester, Sam Pinball
- Françoise Blanchard as Coyotito, Miss Jingle, Pipo, Gladys, Edna
- Jean Tolzac as Chien Jaune, Joss Jamon, Oggie Svenson, Alfonsino, Erasmus Mulligan, Tchong Yen Li
- Gilles Biot as Colorado Bill, La Chique, Zip Kilroy
- Pascale Jacquemont as The diva Graziella, Jenny
- Emmanuel Karsen as Jolly Jumper (episode 8)

=== English ===
- Christian Erickson as Lucky Luke
- David Gasman as William Dalton, Jack Dalton
- Leslie Clack as Averell Dalton, Rantanplan
- Kim-Michelle Broderick as additional voices
- Patty Hannock as additional voices
- Allan Wenger as Joe Dalton, Jolly Jumper

== Episodes ==
No.	Title	Original release date
1	"The Ghost Town"	September 15, 1991
2	"The Judge"	September 22, 1991
3	"The Dalton's Escape"	September 29, 1991
4	"The 20th Calvary"	October 6, 1991
5	"Lucky Luke vs. Joss Jamon"	October 13, 1991
6	"Nitroglycerine"	October 20, 1991
7	"Tortillas for the Daltons"	October 27, 1991
8	"The Pony Express"	November 3, 1991
9	"Bounty the Hunter"	November 10, 1991
10	"Bride of Lucky Luke"	November 17, 1991
11	"Sarah Bernhardt"	November 24, 1991
12	"The Peddler"	December 1, 1991
13	"Challenge to Lucky Luke"	December 8, 1991
14	"Apache Canyon"	December 15, 1991
15	"Rantanplan's Legacy"	December 22, 1991
16	"The Daily Star"	December 29, 1991
17	"The Dalton Cousins"	January 5, 1992
18	"The Daltons Are Still Running"	January 12, 1992
19	"Lucky Luke Against Pat Poker"	January 19, 1992
20	"The Alibi"	January 26, 1992
21	"Beware of the Bluefoots"	February 2, 1992
22	"The One-Armed Bandit"	February 9, 1992
23	"Western Circus"	February 16, 1991
24	"Fingers"	February 23, 1991
25	"Dangerous Passage"	March 1, 1992
26	"The Battle of the Rice"	March 8, 1992

== Home media ==
The series was released on videocassette in the 1990s and was distributed by Citel Video. The complete series was also released on DVD in 5 volumes in October 2010 also by Citel. The episodes are out of order:

- Fingers (episodes 24, 26, 1, 2, 4)
- Rantanplan's Legacy (episodes 15, 17, 9, 11, 6, 3)
- Western Circus (episodes 23, 25, 5, 16, 18)
- The One-Armed Bandit (episodes 22, 21, 13, 7, 14)
- Bride of Lucky Luke (episodes 10, 12, 8, 19, 20)

The complete series was also released on DVD in Canada containing French and English language soundtracks.
