= May Food Keep Us Together =

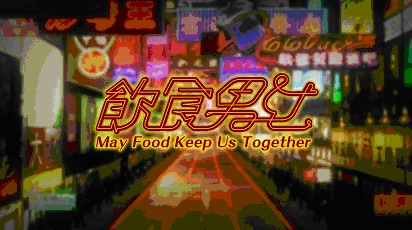
- 飲食男女
- Genre: Documentary
- Created by: Peoples Production
- Country of origin: Hong Kong
- Original languages: Cantonese & Mandarin with Chinese or English subtitles
- No. of seasons: 2 (Season 2 in production)
- No. of episodes: 52 (Season 1, 2011–2012)

Production
- Production locations: Hong Kong, Mainland China, Taiwan
- Camera setup: Canon EOS 5D Mark II; SLR cameras
- Running time: 24 minutes
- Production company: Peoples Production

Original release
- Network: Next TV, Taiwan
- Release: 4 June 2011

May Food Keep Us Together (Chinese: 飲食男女) is a television documentary series on food and people in Hong Kong. The first season contains 52 self-contained episodes, each of which tells the story of a restaurant or eatery.

== Synopsis ==
May food Keep Us Together is a documentary series that captures the lives of ordinary people who cook and serve food as a profession in Hong Kong. There is no celebrity chefs, presenters or voice-over in the series. Through their own voices and accounts, every episode tells a story of these men and women within and beyond the walls of the kitchen.

Apart from telling the human story of these food heroes, the series is also a collection of Hong Kong cuisine. The distinct food culture of Hong Kong is illustrated in the programs.(e.g. Dai Pai Dong, eating dim sum as breakfast, dining together as the ties of family, etc.).

== Production Team ==
May food Keep Us Together is a production of Peoples Production Limited, a wholly owned subsidiary of the Next Media Limited.

== Episodes ==
There are a total of 52 half-hour (24 minutes) episodes in the first season. The following table summarises the cuisines featured.

=== Season 1 ===
Episodes	Titles (original titles in Chinese)	Featured cuisine / food
1	Tango with Snakes (與蛇共舞)	Snake soup and snake feast
2	Al Fresco Dining, Hong Kong-style (食在路邊)	Hong Kong styled seafood
3	Boiling Water Hot Tea (水滾茶靚)	Yum Cha / Dim Sum
4	The Coffee Man (咖啡人生)	Coffee
5	The Dim Sum Masters (叄去壹)	Yum Cha / Dim Sum
6	Sweet Troubles (老實糖水)	Sweet soup
7	More than Enough (盆滿缽滿)	Pooh Choi / Big Bowl Feast
8	There's No Place like Home (回家百利好)	Cha Chaan Teng / Hong Kong-style Teahouse
9	Kung Fu Kitchen (百轉紅廚房)	Chinese home cuisine
10	No Door to be Closed (麵店不關門)	Cantonese styled noodles
11	Roast Goose on Fire (火鳳凰)	Roast Goose
12	Call me Mr. To-fu (豆腐佬係我)	To-fu
13	Love Spins on Beef Offal (牛雜大佬)	Beef offal and brisket noodles
14	Mooncakes for All (大同人月圓)	Mooncakes
15	Five-storied Roast Belly Pork (炭燒五層樓)	Siu yuk / Roast Pig
16	Inside Mr. Bii's Dumplings (老畢的故事)	Shandong Dumpling / Jiaozi
17	Farewell, Dream Team (拍檔再見)	Teochew Cuisine
18	Buns Let Us Live in Peace (總會平安)	Traditional Ping on Buns
19	Chicken Intestines for the Soul (緣繫蘭香)	Beef Omasum and Chicken intestine noodles
20	Swiss-sweet Chicken Wings (黑色幽默)	Soy-sauce Western
21	A Time to Cook (造麵有時)	Taiwan beef noodles
22	Father and Son on a Bamboo Ride (剛柔竹昇麵)	Jook-sing noodles
23	The Vietnamese Way to Feel Full (越南式溫飽與幸福)	Vietnamese cuisine
24	When Times Taste Bittersweet (奶茶回甘時)	Hong Kong-style milk tea
25	Old flavours, New Times (回鍋懷舊菜)	Traditional Chinese cuisine
26	Hot Pot Rock'n Roll (滾滾樂手)	Hong Kong styled hotpot
27	What Makes Us A Couple (無冤不成夫妻檔)	Dai Pai Dong
28	The Tie of a Teochew Family (情暖潮州冷)	Teochew cuisine
29	Jamming Tears and Smiles (Jam出百味人生)	Handmade jam
30	The Banquet Must Go On (不散筵席)	Banquet catering
31	Going with the Ebb and Flow (順流逆流)	Typhoon shelter styled seafood
32	Growing Old with Chinese Pastries (夕陽餅香)	Traditional Chinese Pastries
33	Happy Chef, Happy Restaurant (法式開心大廚)	French Cuisine
34	The Grassland Seahopper (塔門遊子)	Congee and seafood
35	Making Sushi, Making Friends (和味･喜八)	Japanese Cuisine
36	Brothers and Bothers (難為車仔麵)	Cart noodle
37	Little Egg Tarts Made by My Great Parents (小城蛋撻)	Egg tarts
38	Off the Stage, On the Pan (後生仔煎包)	Shanghai-styled meat bun
39	Fish Balls on the Road (手打魚蛋腳踏車)	Fish balls
40	Congees for Three (食粥三代)	Cantonese styled congee
41	The Women in Our Family (廚房半邊天)	Seafood and Hong Kong stir-fry
42	The Pride of a Hangzhou Cook (味出杭州)	Hangzhou cuisine
43	A Colorful Organic Taste (種出美味色彩)	Organic vegetable
44	French Chef in a Chinese Village (法國大廚回小鄉)	French home cuisine
45	Last Stall Standing (圍村街坊味)	Dai Pai Dong
46	The Burnings of Brotherhood (兄弟不怕洪爐火)	Steak
47	The Chef with the Dragon Tattoo (左青龍 右大廚)	Hong Kong stir-fry
48	Nyonya Mother Cooks Best (家香娘惹菜)	Nyonya Cuisine
49	Best Before (此日期前最佳)	Yunnan wild mushroom
50	My Grandma from Thailand (泰菜傳香)	Thai cuisine
51	Fresh Chef, Fresh Seafood (流浮海上鮮)	Seafood
52	Bugs and Noodles, Yunnan Delicacies (情牽米線)	Yunnan cuisine

== Awards and nominations ==
- 17th Asian Television Awards 2012, Singapore

Winner (Best Infotainment Program)

Finalist (Best Infotainment Program)

- 48th Chicago Intercom Competition 2012

Gold Plaque (Community Relations / Development)

Silver Plaque (Human Relations / Social Issues)

- 2012 Accolade Competition, USA

The Best of Show Award

The Award of Merit

- 33rd Annual Telly Awards 2012

Bronze Award (Documentary)

Bronze Award (Cultural)

- 47th Chicago Intercom Competition 2011

Gold Plaque (Community Relations / Development)

Silver Plaque (Human Relations / Social Issues)

Silver Plaque (Arts / Culture)

- 16th Asian Television Awards 2011, Singapore

Finalist (Best Infotainment Program)

== Broadcasting ==
May Food Keep Us Together was premiered on Next TV in Taiwan on 4 June 2011. Subsequently, the series has been broadcast in San Francisco, Hong Kong, Malaysia and Singapore.

Territories	Network/Channel	Premiere date	Timeslot
Taiwan	Next TV (Variety)	4 Jun 2011	1100 and 1500 on Sat (Re-run)
San Francisco	KTSF 26	29 Oct 2011	1730 on Sat
Hong Kong	TVB HD Jade; TVB J2	19 Feb 2012; 29 May 2012	1755 on Sun; 2130 on Tue
Singapore	Mio TV (Jia Le)	5 Sep 2012	1830 on Wed
Malaysia	Astro (Quan Jia HD)	21 Oct 2012	1830 on Sun
