= Helen Tam =

- Born: November 27, 1963 (age 61)
- Occupation: Television host

Helen Tam Yuk Ying (traditional Chinese: 譚玉瑛; simplified Chinese: 谭玉瑛; pinyin: Tán Yùyīng, born 27 November 1963) is a host of children's programmes in Hong Kong.

She joined Television Broadcasts Limited (TVB) in 1980 and has hosted for children's shows since the 1980s, including 430 Space Shuttle (1982–1989), Flash Fax (1989–1999), Kids Click (2000–2004) and After School ICU (2005 - 2014). Therefore, she is often called "Sister Tam Yuk Ying" (譚玉瑛姐姐) as if she is an elder sister.

== Biography ==
Due to unsatisfactory HKCEE results, Helen Tam was unable to be promoted to form 6, and she applied for courses in shipping engineering and constructions, but was rejected by both because she did not have enough weight. As the talent training class of TVB was open for recruitment, she applied in the hope of learning magic, and she was subsequently enrolled.

At the completion of the training class, Helen had a chance to act in a TVB serial drama. On 26 April 1982, she begin her career in children's shows when she was assigned as a co-host in the newly established children' show, 430 Space Shuttle. In the course of 30 years, the children's shows were re-organized several times by TVB, but Helen remained a core member of the shows and is the only person to host all of the shows. She was most well known by her role as an English-teaching witch in Flash Fax. Some of her partners, such as Stephen Chow, Tony Leung and Athena Chu, have become successful film actors. In 2012 TVB celebrated her 30-year contributions to the children's shows. However, due to human resource decisions, in 2014, she was forced to relinquish her roles as a children TV host after her contract was not renewed, ending her 32-year tenure. She then made her debut as an entertainment news host, and made her debut on April 17, 2014,

In spite of her famous role, Tam is not fond of having her own children.

As a prominent figure among teenagers, she regularly appears in TV commercials and promotional films targeted at students. She played the role of a school principal in the "DSE Myth" series produced by the Hong Kong Examinations and Assessment Authority. She explained to the candidates the instructions and procedures for candidates of the Hong Kong Diploma of Secondary Education Examination to ease candidates' concerns.
