= Berry Bees (TV series) =

- Official poster for the series featuring the Berry Bees. From left to right: Juliette, Lola, and Bobby.
- Genre: Action; Adventure; Comedy; Spy
- Based on: Berry Bees by Cat Le Blanc
- Directed by: Niccolò Sacchi
- Creative directors: Lisa Arioli; Jo Boag
- Voices of: Sheena May; Nneka Okoye; Harriet Kershaw; Tim Howar; Josie Taylor; Harriet Collings; Daniel Fletcher; Dan Russell; Ben Whitehead; Colin Cassady
- Theme music composer: Fabrizio Baldoni
- Opening theme: "Berry Bees" by Filip (StudioPros)
- Ending theme: "Berry Bees" (instrumental)
- Composer: Fabrizio Baldoni
- Countries of origin: Italy; Australia; Ireland; India; Singapore
- Original languages: Italian; English; Hindi; Malay; Mandarin; Tamil
- No. of seasons: 1
- No. of episodes: 52

Production
- Executive producers: Caterina Vacchi; Suzanne Ryan; Paul Cummins; Anish Js Mehta; Sara Cabras; Jo Rooney; Andy Ryan; Claudia Mazzucco; Pietro Marietti
- Producers: Lorenza Lazzarini; Yasmin Jones; Cathy Ní Fhlaithearta; Joris Eckelkamp; Adi Shayan; Devdatta D. Potnis
- Running time: 11 minutes
- Production companies: Atlantyca Entertainment; SLR Productions; Telegael; Cosmos-Maya Production

Original release
- Network: 9Go! (Australia); Rai Gulp (Italy)
- Release: 5 October 2019 – 16 July 2020

Berry Bees is an animated television series developed for the Nine Network that premiered on 9Go! in Australia on 5 October 2019. The series is based on the Italian book series of the same name by Cat Le Blanc. The series is produced by Atlantyca Entertainment, SLR Productions, Telegael and Cosmos-Maya Production. The entire series is available to stream on Stan.

The show centers around three young girls who carry out spy missions.

== Plot ==
Bobby, Lola, and Juliette are three extraordinary 10-year-old girls who live a seemingly normal life. However the trio work undercover as the "Berry Bees" for the Bee Intelligence Agency (B.I.A. for short), a secret agency that selected them to carry out special spy missions. The girls, all codenamed after a type of berry, are given gadgets each episode by the head of the agency, Ms. Berry.

Usually the girls have to foil the evil plans of recurring villains such as Tara Bytes, Mirage, and the Greenthumbs. At the end of each episode, the villain escapes the confusion to fight the girls another day while things return to normal.

== Characters ==
=== Main ===
- Bobby – An expert in technology and a nerd. Her codename is Raspberry.
- Lola – A skilled contortionist and acrobat. Her codename is Strawberry.
- Juliette – A talented actress and mentalist. Her codename is Blueberry.
- Ms. Berry – The head of the B.I.A.

=== Villains ===
- Tara Bytes – A corrupt tech mogul. Her plots usually focus on advanced technology.
- Aaron Mirage – A thief who can assume the identity of anyone.
- Cosmo and Fauna Greenthumb – A bickering old couple who wish to make the environment better for animals.

== Production ==
On 16 October 2018, it was announced that an animated series based on the Berry Bees book series was being produced. The series is produced by Atlantyca Entertainment in Italy, SLR Productions in Australia, Telegael in Ireland, and Cosmos-Maya Production in India.

The show's visual team found their inspiration in Mission Impossible and James Bond movies. The director, Niccolò Sacchi also singled out The Incredibles for its character and action scenes. He looked at Kim Possible all the time, "because of the show’s fantastic direction and staging of the shots." The team's reference for design was Rapunzel's Tangled Adventure. "[He] wanted to have the same feel for the characters with no outline and where shadows were used to give depth to the characters' skin and expressions."

== Episodes ==
The first season consists of 52 11-minute episodes.

No.	Title	Directed by	Written by	Storyboard by	Australian air date	Italian air date	Prod. code
1	"Princesses Pose a Problem" "Missione doppia principessa"	Niccolò Sacchi	Katiedid Langrock and Keith Brumpton	Ivan Evans	5 October 2019	19 December 2019	TBA
The Berry Bees have to protect the princess of a small European country when Aaron Mirage disguises himself as a photographer, intending to steal valuable pearls.
2	"Social Oversharing" "Ladri di segreti"	Niccolò Sacchi	Katiedid Langrock	Ian Milne	5 October 2019	16 December 2019	106
New high-tech headphones upload people's secrets when connected to a social media app. Tara Bytes invented them so she can sell an anti-secret-stealing device at a high price.
3	"Xmas 2.0" "Natale 2.0"	Niccolò Sacchi	Written by : David Witt; Story by : Charlotte Hamlyn	Regine Clarke	12 October 2019	24 December 2019	TBA
4	"Xmas 2.0" "Natale 2.0"	Niccolò Sacchi	Written by : David Witt; Story by : Charlotte Hamlyn	Caiyen Tse	12 October 2019	24 December 2019	TBA
In this 2-part episode, the Berry Bees have to go to the North Pole to save Santa on Christmas Eve. Tara wishes to kidnap him so that she will be the ambassador of Christmas.
5	"The Milk Shakey Shook" "Spie, animali e passepartout"	Niccolò Sacchi	Katiedid Langrock and Keith Brumpton	Cindy Scharka and Simon Turnbull	19 October 2019	17 December 2019	102
The Greenthumbs ransack the "Milk Shakey Shake", the Berry Bees' headquarters, holding the BIA's adult spies' information for ransom.
6	"Stars Fall" "Le scarpe Salta-Salta"	Niccolò Sacchi	Katiedid Langrock and Keith Brumpton	Greg Ingram	19 October 2019	18 December 2019	103
The new "Moon Bouncer" shoes brainwash their wearers into committing crimes, which Tara uses to cover for her theft of a rare asteroid.
7	"It's a Winner Wipeout" "Una buona torta non si scorda mai"	Niccolò Sacchi	Katiedid Langrock	Paolo Solaro	27 October 2019	22 December 2019	112
At a pie-eating contest, high-tech towels literally wipe the memories from people.
8	"Hypnotic Hair Don't Care" "Brillantina con ipnosi"	Niccolò Sacchi	Joel Slack-Smith	Archi Bolina	27 October 2019	18 December 2019	104
Jeremy Dreamboat, a young rock star, sends subliminal messages to people using a special shampoo, which the Greenthumbs use to make his fans act like animals.
9	"Haunted Amusement Park" "Fantasmi al luna park"	Niccolò Sacchi	Maria Chiara Oltolini	Ian Milne	3 November 2019	22 December 2019	120
Aaron disguises himself as the ghost to steal treasure buried underneath a soon-to-be-demolished amusement park.
10	"Drop in the Ocean" "S.O.S. Barriera corallina"	Niccolò Sacchi	Senta Rich and Nick Wilkinson	Caiyen Tse	3 November 2019	16 December 2019	121
Strange currents at a junior regatta turn out to be cover for Aaron Mirage's illegal pearl fishing expedition.
11	"Tricky Business" "Missione spettacolo truccato"	Niccolò Sacchi	Beatrice Guzzetti	Tang Lee	9 November 2019	21 December 2019	128
Aaron disguises himself as a magician's stagehand in order to steal the magician's book of tricks.
12	"To Bee or Not to Bee" "Non ti ricordar di me"	Niccolò Sacchi	Muireann Ní Chíobháin	Regine Clarke	9 November 2019	21 December 2019	125
The Greenthumbs plan to deploy exotic flowers with a memory-wiping scent at a flower garden, on the day the Berry Bees have their field trip there.
13	"String Sting" "Un violino sotto chiave"	Niccolò Sacchi	Alexa Moses	Birgit Maier and Irene D′Apote	10 November 2019	17 December 2019	111
The Berry Bees have to protect a child prodigy violinist's rare "Minivarius" from Aaron.
14	"Growing Pains" "Teneri pelosetti crescono"	Niccolò Sacchi	Cleon Prineas	Laura Davanzo	10 November 2019	23 December 2019	117
The Berry Bees go to a remote town in Australia to prevent the Greenthumbs from turning novelty pets into ravenous monsters.
15	"Love Is in the Net" "Troppo perfetto per essere vero"	Niccolò Sacchi	Gabriele Guariso	Simona Capovilla	17 November 2019	19 December 2019	109
Identical children named "Ralph" and "Britney Pretty" appear in schools all across the country, which are androids created by Tara to gain popularity.
16	"Clover's Got Talent" "Sfida tra talenti"	Niccolò Sacchi	Richard Hansom	Alice Nicoletti	17 November 2019	29 December 2019	TBA
At a talent show, all the winners are subjected to various accidents. Tara staged them in an elaborate plan to have her niece, DeeDee, win, and become an influencer for her brand.
17	"Someone Went Off Course" "Una nave fuori rotta"	Niccolò Sacchi	Andrea Marchetti	Cristina Parisotto	24 November 2019	26 December 2019	110
The Berry Bees investigate when ships go missing in the North Sea; the Greenthumbs sank them to save the oceans.
18	"Rare Earth Sledding" "Che fine ha fatto la neve?"	Niccolò Sacchi	Katiedid Langrock	Paolo Solaro and Laura Davanzo	24 November 2019	23 December 2019	124
A mountain in Switzerland has mysteriously not received snowfall; as the Berry Bees find out, Tara has been operating an illegal mine in order to extract a rare earth mineral that can create flexible touchscreens.
19	"Berry Fall" "Tre volte trappola"	Niccolò Sacchi	Joel Slack-Smith	Amy Stewart	1 December 2019	31 December 2019	TBA
20	"Berry Fall" "Tre volte trappola"	Niccolò Sacchi	Joel Slack-Smith	Amy Stewart	1 December 2019	31 December 2019	TBA
In this two-part episode, the Berry Bees are lured to an abandoned amusement park, as part of a diabolical plan masterminded by Tara, Aaron, and the Greenthumbs.
21	"Look, Up in the Sky" "Un eroe in ognuno di noi"	Niccolò Sacchi	Ross Duncan	Manuk Chang	8 December 2019	28 December 2019	138
The Berry Bees have to protect a rare comic book at a comic book convention, which Aaron wants to steal.
22	"Cowabunga, Bees!" "Cowabunga, Berry Bees!"	Niccolò Sacchi	Katiedid Langrock	Archi Bolina	8 December 2019	28 December 2019	144
While the Berry Bees are on vacation at a desert ranch, the Greenthumbs create abnormal growths of cacti.
23	"A Prank Is Not a Crime" "Scherzare non è reato"	Niccolò Sacchi	Andrea Marchetti	Regine Clarke	14 December 2019	30 December 2019	115
A new student, Isaac, uses a high-tech mask to play pranks and appear as different people.
24	"Action! BBs on the Movie Set" "Pronte, apine, si gira!"	Niccolò Sacchi	Cassandra Albani	Cindy Scharka	14 December 2019	26 December 2019	118
Tara plants subliminal messages in an upcoming superhero movie to brainwash kids into uncharacteristically acting like superheroes.
25	"Mission to Mars" "Missione su Marte"	Niccolò Sacchi	Muireann Ní Chíobháin	Alice Nicoletti	15 December 2019	29 December 2019	137
The Greenthumbs sabotage the launch of a Space Shuttle in order to give animals new life on Mars.
26	"License to Munch" "Bruchi mangia kart"	Niccolò Sacchi	Amy Stewart	Daniel Foley	15 December 2019	30 December 2019	105
The Greenthumbs genetically engineer giant caterpillars in order to disrupt a go-kart race in Australia.
27	"Chinese Shadows" "Ombre cinesi"	Niccolò Sacchi	Nicola Peirano	Laura Davanzo	4 July 2020	6 May 2020	126
The Berry Bees have to protect a Chinese statue from Aaron.
28	"Nightmare Before Halloween" "Un Halloween da paura"	Niccolò Sacchi	Antonio Kyriakopoulos	Laura Davanzo	4 July 2020	14 May 2020	122
Tara's new Halloween costumes brainwash their wearers into acting like the characters they resemble.
29	"Micro Mayhem" "Furto tra i ghiacci"	Niccolò Sacchi	Greg Ó Braonáin	Ivan Evans	11 July 2020	TBA	TBA
Aaron desires to steal a newly discovered microorganism from a science lab.
30	"The Winner Loses It All" "Giovani geni in pericolo"	Niccolò Sacchi	Andrea Marchetti	Alice Nicoletti and Giorgio Scotto	11 July 2020	TBA	TBA
The Berry Bees compete on a trivia game show where Tara uses the winner's intelligence to power an AI.
31	"Mind the Cat" "Attenti al gato!"	Niccolò Sacchi	Saschia Masini	Archi Bolina	18 July 2020	7 May 2020	116
The Berry Bees have to protect the princess of a tropical island when Aaron desires to steal her cat's necklace.
32	"Watch the Birdie" "Pioggia di aquiloni"	Niccolò Sacchi	Ross Duncan	Stefano Giannelli and Laura Davanzo	18 July 2020	8 May 2020	119
The Greenthumbs seek to disrupt a kite-flying competition with giant mechanical birds.
33	"Boiling Point" "Tropici in Irlanda"	Niccolò Sacchi	Senta Rich and Nick Wilkinson	Cristina Parisotto	25 July 2020	15 May 2020	127
The Berry Bees travel to Ireland when the Greenthumbs destroy a Celtic stone structure for their circus.
34	"Hamster Haul" "Il ruggito del criceto"	Niccolò Sacchi	Dee Roycroft	Paola Solaro	25 July 2020	13 May 2020	129
A dinosaur bone goes missing and is found at a pet show.
35	"Mystery in Venice" "Mistero a Venezia"	Niccolò Sacchi	Cassandra Albani	Giorgio Scotto and Cristina Parisotto	1 August 2020	10 May 2020	130
The Berry Bees travel to Venice to prevent Aaron from stealing a rare Venetian mask.
36	"Taking the Plunge" "Un tuffo a rana"	Niccolò Sacchi	Clare Dowling	Stefano Giannelli	1 August 2020	6 May 2020	131
The Greenthumbs disrupt a junior swimming contest by dumping frogs into the pool.
37	"Mummy's Boy" "Mummie, dinosauri e falsi allarmi"	Niccolò Sacchi	Carol Walsh	Stefano Giannelli	8 August 2020	18 May 2020	133
Aaron disguises himself as a mummy in order to steal a rare Egyptian necklace from a museum, while the Berry Bees have a sleepover there.
38	"Having a Ball" "Un campione alla Paillard"	Niccolò Sacchi	Greg Ó Braonáin	Daniel Foley, Ian Milne and Richard Bailey	8 August 2020	11 May 2020	134
Aaron disguises himself as a basketball champion in order to steal a trophy.
39	"Don't Stop the Music" "Una musica spinosa"	Niccolò Sacchi	Senta Rich and Nick Wilkinson	Gary Blatchford	15 August 2020	16 May 2020	135
The Greenthumbs develop plants that grow rapidly when exposed to music, which they deploy at a rock concert,
40	"The Host Heist" "Tutti in carrozza!"	Niccolò Sacchi	Ross Duncan	Daniel Foley	15 August 2020	14 May 2020	136
Using a VR exercise app, Aaron brainwashes several people into helping him infiltrate a toy store in order to steal a levitating toy train.
41	"The Game is Over" "Verdure all'arrabbiata"	Niccolò Sacchi	Andrea Marchetti	Ian Milne and Ivan Evans	22 August 2020	12 May 2020	139
A spy from Beetle Intelligence 6 (or BI6 for short), the BIA's sister organization, gets lost in a Minecraft-esque video game.
42	"Smart Pets" "Scambio di posto"	Niccolò Sacchi	Maria Chiara Oltolini	Laura Davanzo	22 August 2020	10 May 2020	140
The Greenthumbs' new pet salon secretly switches the minds of pets and their owners.
43	"The Tennis Snatch" "Acchiappa la racchetta, Lola!"	Niccolò Sacchi	Dee Roycroft	Stefano Giannelli	29 August 2020	17 May 2020	142
When several young sports players' lucky items are stolen, Lola must go undercover as a boy to prevent Aaron from stealing his next prize - a tennis racket.
44	"Model Bee-haviour" "Spionaggio con stile"	Niccolò Sacchi	Richard Hansom	Laura Davanzo	29 August 2020	12 May 2020	143
The Berry Bees go undercover at Milan's Fashion Show to prevent Aaron from stealing an expensive hat.
45	"School's Out" "La scuola è chiusa!"	Niccolò Sacchi	Written by : Greg Ó Braonáin; Story by : Clare Dowling	Alice Nicoletti	5 September 2020	13 May 2020	145
Carly, a new student, stays with the Berry Bees. She is the daughter of archaeologists who have discovered Atlantis, and Aaron wants to kidnap her to get information out of her.
46	"Patty Pizza"	Niccolò Sacchi	Greg Ó Braonáin	Giorgio Scotto and Cristina Parisotto	5 September 2020	17 May 2020	146
New "Patty Pizza" dolls turn out to be robotic spies sent by Tara, which allow her to control all their victims' devices.
47	"Mountain Madness" "Yeti o non Yeti?"	Niccolò Sacchi	Katiedid Langrock	Elk Studio	12 September 2020	9 May 2020	147
The Berry Bees save a junior mountaineering team from a yeti. Although the one they see is actually the Greenthumbs, they later see a real yeti itself.
48	"It's a Whole New World in There" "Ogni desiderio si avvera!"	Niccolò Sacchi	Antonio Kyriakopoulos	Elk Studio	12 September 2020	9 May 2020	148
Tara creates a virtual reality video game where anyone can get anything they desire. However, its users end up becoming zombie-like in real life and unable to do anything else.
49	"Cat-astrophe" "Gattastrofe"	Niccolò Sacchi	Ross Duncan	Alice Nicoletti and Giorgio Scotto	19 September 2020	18 May 2020	149
The Berry Bees uncover a secret experiment by the Greenthumbs which involves exchanging the behaviors of cats and tigers.
50	"Bees Outback" "Apine in campeggio"	Niccolò Sacchi	Richard Hansom	Elk Studio	19 September 2020	11 May 2020	150
The Berry Bees go out camping in the Australian outback, without their phones or spy gadgets. Still, they manage to foil a Greenthumb experiment which involves turning sheep into ferocious, horned creatures.
51	"Spelling Bees in Action" "Missione parole da dividere"	Niccolò Sacchi	Clare Dowling	Elk Studio	26 September 2020	15 May 2020	151
A child inventor is to receive a medal for her creation of a robot that can spell anything. However, Aaron seeks to steal the medal.
52	"Dog Gone" "Fiuta, agente Fluffy!"	Niccolò Sacchi	Greg Ó Braonáin	Giorgio Scotto	26 September 2020	16 May 2020	152
The Berry Bees and their dog Fluffy help foil Aaron's plans to steal Tricksy, a dog trained to perform several elaborate tricks.

== Broadcast ==
Berry Bees first premiered on 9Go! in Australia on 5 October 2019. By the 7th episode, premieres suddenly moved from Saturdays to Sundays starting 27 October. In Italy, the series premiered on Rai Gulp on 16 December with episodes 2 and 10. Since two segments are combined into one in the Australian broadcast of the series, the cold open in every second episode that airs is cut, but is retained in the Italian broadcast due to the segments being separately aired.

== Awards ==
On 12 July 2019, the episode "Hypnotic Hair Don't Care" was nominated in the 52nd Annual AWGIE Awards in the "Animation" category, with writer Joel Slack-Smith as a recipient, before the series premiered in Australia. It lost to an episode of Beat Bugs.
