= Jade Starbiz =

Hong Kong entertainment talk/news program

Jade Starbiz (traditional Chinese: 娛樂大搜查; simplified Chinese: 娱乐大搜查) was a Hong Kong entertainment talk/news program on Television Broadcasts Limited that was replaced by E-Buzz, a similar program, as of October 2005. It featured various celebrity news, gossip, and interviews, current popular music and culture in Hong Kong, and new and upcoming shows on TVB. Jade Starbiz played on TVB Jade and on many international TVB channels.

The first episode of Jade Starbiz aired on 30 June 2002. Its last episode aired 23 April 2005. In total, Jade Starbiz had 736 episodes. Mat Yeung, Timmy Hung, Lily Hong, and Anita Chan were the show's hosts in March 2005.

== Reception ==
Sing Tao Daily said in 2003 that the Jade Starbiz presenters "usually have somewhat vague faces" because "being a second-tier host with smooth talk is enough. Even if they’re not good at first, after enough time on the job, they become okay." The television critic continued, "The content is okay too. ... Difficult topics are narrated and easy-to-shoot ones come with video and audio." According to Macau Daily in March 2005, the show had bad ratings. The newspaper called it "a very entertaining program that allows viewers to receive the latest entertainment trends and explosive news in real time". However, the journalist called it "a dispensable program" since the program's news previously had been reported in newspapers so "the audience will feel bored" when seeing the news a second time at the end of the day.
