= The New Adventures of Lucky Luke =

French-Canadian animated television series

- Series banner
- Genre: Western; Action-adventure; Comedy; Slapstick
- Based on: Lucky Luke by Morris
- Directed by: Olivier Jean-Marie; Jean-Charles Finck
- Starring: See voice cast
- Composers: Ramon Pipin; Hugues Le Bars; Hervé Lavandier
- Countries of origin: France; Canada
- Original language: French
- No. of series: 1
- No. of episodes: 52

Production
- Executive producer: Marc du Pontavice
- Producer: Marc du Pontavice
- Running time: 22 minutes
- Production companies: Xilam; Lucky Comics; Tooncan Productions, Inc.

Original release
- Network: France 2/France 3 (France); Télé-Québec/Teletoon (Canada)
- Release: September 16, 2001 – May 4, 2003

Related
- Lucky Luke; Rintindumb

The New Adventures of Lucky Luke (French: Les Nouvelles Aventures de Lucky Luke) is an animated television series based on the Franco-Belgian comic book series of the same name created by Belgian cartoonist Morris. 52 episodes were produced.

The show was directed by Olivier Jean-Marie and Jean-Charles Finck and produced by Marc du Pontavice at the Xilam studios in Paris, France. The music for the series was composed by Ramon Pipin, Hugues Le Bars and Hervé Lavandier. A theatrical feature-length film directly based on the series titled Go West! A Lucky Luke Adventure was later released in 2007.

== Plot ==
Lucky Luke is a cowboy who shoots faster than his own shadow. With the help of his faithful horse Jolly Jumper (the world's smartest horse) and sometimes also Rintindumb (the world's dumbest dog), he maintains peace and order in the Wild West. He hunts down desperadoes, keeps sharpshooters like Billy the Kid in check and constantly recaptures and returns The Daltons to prison.

== Voice cast ==
=== Original French cast ===
- Antoine de Caunes as Lucky Luke
- Eric Legrand as Jolly Jumper, Jack and William Dalton
- Bernard Alane: Averell Dalton
- Gérard Surugue as Joe Dalton
- Francis Perrin as Rintindumb
- Isabelle Mangini as Calamity Jane
- Eric Metayer as Général Custer
- Donald Reignoux as Billy the Kid
- Marc Saez as Shérif Sleekhorn, TchinasTchin
- François Siener as Aigle Intègre, John Glutton
- Françoise Vallon as Lola Montes
- Valérie Karsenti

=== English cast ===
- Marcel Jeannin as Lucky Luke, Rintindumb and Additional Voices
- Mark Camacho as William Dalton and Additional Voices
- Ellen David
- Sonja Ball as Additional Voices
- John Stocker as Joe Dalton, General Custer and Additional Voices
- A.J. Henderson as Additional Voices
- Arthur Holden as Additional Voices
- Laura Teasdale
- Bronwen Mantel
- Pauline Little as Calamity Jane
- Rick Jones as Jolly Jumper, Jack Dalton and Additional Voices
- Rick Miller as Billy the Kid
- Susan Glover as Additional Voices
- Terry Simpson as Averell Dalton
- Kathleen Fee as Big Bone Bear

== Episodes ==
No.	Title (French title bottom)	Directed by	Written by	Storyboard by	Original release date
1	"Liki Liki"	Olivier Jean-Marie	Franck Ekicni	Olivier Jean-Marie	September 16, 2001
2	"Lucky Luke in Alaska" "Lucky Luke en Alaska"	Olivier Jean-Marie	Franck Ekinci	Charles Vaucelle	February 24, 2002
3	"Lucky Luke vs. Sherlock Holmes" "Les Dalton contre Sherlock Holmes"	Olivier Jean-Marie	Yves Coulon	François Rosso	September 23, 2001
4	"Lucky Luke Meets Lucky Luke" "Lucky Luke contre Lucky Luke"	Olivier Jean-Marie	Franck Ekinci	Luc Vinciguerra	September 30, 2001
5	"Hurray for Holly Woods" "Lumière dans l'Quest"	Olivier Jean-Marie	Olivier Jean-Marie and Jean-Luc Promental	Olivier Jean-Marie	October 14, 2001
6	"Flower Power for the Daltons" "Ni Dalton, Ni Maître"	Olivier Jean-Marie	Jean-François Henry	Jean-Charles Finck	October 21, 2001
7	"Indian Roulette" "Roulette indienne"	Olivier Jean-Marie	Jean-Luc Promental	Olivier Jean-Marie	October 28, 2001
8	"Fort Custer"	Olivier Jean-Marie	Jean-François Henry	Jean-Jacques Prunes	November 4, 2001
9	"The Daltons' Treasure" "Le tresor de Dalton"	Olivier Jean-Marie	Jean-François Henry	Diego Zamora	December 4, 2002
10	"The Flying Cowboy" "l'Homme volant"	Olivier Jean-Marie	Jean-Luc Fromental	Charles Vaucelle	November 18, 2001
11	"For a Fistful of Dalton" "Pour une poignee de Dalton"	Olivier Jean-Marie	Jean-Luc Fromental	Jean-Charles Finck	November 25, 2001
12	"The Crown Princes" "Les heritiers"	Olivier Jean-Marie	Jean-François Henry	François Rosso	December 2, 2001
13	"The Daltons Go Native" "Les Indien dalton"	Olivier Jean-Marie	Jean-Marc Lenglen	Charles Vaucelle	December 9, 2001
14	"The Last of the Buffalo" "Les derniers bisons"	Olivier Jean-Marie	Jean-François Henry	François Rosso	March 12, 2002
15	"Justice for the Daltons" "Justice pour les Dalton"	Olivier Jean-Marie	Stephen Desberg	Phillipe Leconte	March 3, 2002
16	"The Daltons' Christmas" "Le Noël des Dalton"	Olivier Jean-Marie	Kamel Benyahia and Jean-François Henry	Augusto Zanovello	December 13, 2002
17	"Cuff Love" "Les Dalton se dechianent"	Olivier Jean-Marie	Yves Coulon	Eric Serre	December 30, 2001
18	"Vultures Over the Prairie" "Vautours dans la plaine"	Olivier Jean-Marie	Jean-Marc Lenglen	Phillipe Leconte	January 6, 2002
19	"A New Dad for the Daltons" "Un papa pour les Dalton"	Olivier Jean-Marie	Monique Reboh and Patrick Nordmann	Olivier Jean-Marie	January 13, 2002
20	"Unlucky in Love" "Les promises"	Olivier Jean-Marie	Laurent Rullier and Jean-François Henry	Jean-Charles Finck	January 20, 2002
21	"Desperadoes Union" "Desperados Union"	Olivier Jean-Marie	Olivier Jean-Marie and Jean-François Henry	Laurent Salou	January 27, 2002
22	"Ghosts and Bagpipes" "Fantômes et cornemuses"	Olivier Jean-Marie	Lorris Murail and Jean-Luc Fromental	Bruno Couette	February 3, 2002
23	"The Commodore" "Le Commodore"	Olivier Jean-Marie	Jean-Luc Fromental	Pilar Balsalobre	February 10, 2002
24	"Don Quijote of Texas" "Don Quichotte del Texas"	Olivier Jean-Marie	Jean-Marc Lenglen	Jean-Luc Abiven	March 10, 2002
25	"The Battle" "La bataille"	Olivier Jean-Marie	Jean-François Henry	Olivier Grabias	February 17, 2002
26	"A Wanted Woman" "La cavale"	Olivier Jean-Marie	Jean-Marc Lenglen	Laurent Salou	March 17, 2002
27	"Lola Montes" "Lola Montès"	Olivier Jean-Marie	Kamel Benyahia and Jean-François Henry	Charles Vaucelle	April 14, 2002
28	"The Beast of Alabama" "La bête de l'Alabama"	Olivier Jean-Marie	Jean-Marc Lenglen	Charles Vaucelle	April 28, 2002
29	"The Daltons See Double" "Les Daltons voient Double"	Olivier Jean-Marie	Peter Berts	Bruno Couette	July 23, 2002
30	"A Cannon for the Daltons" "Un canon pour les Dalton"	Jean-Charles Finck	Charles Imbert and Franck Ekinci	Laurent Salou	September 15, 2002
31	"Forbidden Romance" "Romance indienne"	Olivier Jean-Marie	Yves Coulon	Pilar Balsalobre	September 22, 2002
32	"The Undead Daltons" "Les Dalton fantômes"	Jean-Charles Finck	Claude Gars and Jean-François Henry	Charles Vaucelle	September 29, 2002
33	"Kid and the Gang" "Le gang des loupios"	Jean-Charles Finck	Peter Berts	Phillipe Leconte	October 6, 2002
34	"High Flying Daltons" "Les Dalton montent en l'air"	Jean-Charles Finck	Claude Gars and Jean-François Henry Based on the idea by: Stephanie Joalland and Marc Journeux	Richard Faby	October 13, 2002
35	"Custermania"	Jean-Charles Finck	Jean-François Henry	Yves Montagne	October 20, 2002
36	"Jackpot for the Daltons" "Jackpot pour les Dalton"	Olivier Jean-Marie	Jean-Marc Lenglen	Laurent Salou	October 27, 2002
37	"Do You Believe in Martians" "La théorie martienne"	Olivier Jean-Marie	Olivier Jean-Marie and Jean-François Henry	Pilar Balsalobre	November 3, 2002
38	"The Daltons Go Cowboys" "Les Dalton cow-boys"	Jean-Charles Finck	Yves Coulon	Serge Ellisalde	November 10, 2002
39	"The Spies" "Les espions"	Jean-Charles Finck	Franck Ekicni	Alexi Ducord	November 17, 2002
40	"The Charitable Daltons" "Charity Dalton"	Jean-Charles Finck	Olivier Jean-Marie	Richard Faby	November 24, 2002
41	"Dalton Junior"	Jean-Charles Finck	Jean-Marc Lenglen	Laurent Salou	December 8, 2002
42	"The Trappers" "Les trappeurs"	Jean-Charles Finck	Franck Ekicni	Jean-Charles Finck	December 15, 2002
43	"The Revenge of the Daltons" "La vengeance de Dalton"	Jean-Charles Finck	Kamel Benyahia	Sandra Derval	March 2, 2003
44	"The War of the Docs" "La guerrue des toubibs"	Jean-Charles Finck	Jean-Marc Lenglen	Sandra Derval	March 9, 2003
45	"The Daltons vs. Billy the Kid" "Les Dalton contre Billy the Kid"	Jean-Charles Finck	Yves Coulon	Philippe Leconte	March 16, 2003
46	"Can I Get a Witness" "Témoin à charge"	Jean-Charles Finck	Jean-Marc Lenglen	Philippe Leconte	March 23, 2003
47	"The Daltons Pull a Boner" "Un os pour les Dalton"	Jean-Charles Finck	Olivier Jean-Marie	Stephane Pierra	March 30, 2003
48	"The Talisman of the Schnozzolas" "Le talisman des grands nez"	Jean-Charles Finck	Claude Gars	Yves Montagne	April 6, 2003
49	"The Daltons in Uniform" "Soldats dalton"	Jean-Charles Finck	Jean-François Henry Based on an idea by: Patrick Micel	Laurent Salou	April 13, 2003
50	"The Return of Liki Liki" "Le retour de Liki Liki"	Jean-Charles Finck	Jean-François Henry	Alexis Ducord	April 20, 2003
51	"Sequoia Bay" "Séquoia Bay"	Jean-Charles Finck	Beatrice Marthouret	Jean-Luc Abiven	April 27, 2003
52	"The Schoolmaster" "Le maître d'école"	Jean-Charles Finck	Franck Ekicni	Alexis Ducord	May 4, 2003

== Production ==
Ten years after the last series of Lucky Luke episodes, Xilam launched the production of new ones. The hope for Marc du Pontavice for this series is that it has to fill in the gap between the series already aired, "which have aged", and the new episodes, "which have not aged". Fifty-two episodes were made with a budget of 120 million francs (just over EUR 18 million). These episodes are new stories written for the series.

- Because he died in July 2001, and the show was not released until September, apart from a few rushes, Morris never viewed the series.
- The series uses the graphic process Morris used that employs colors to differentiate a character according to its value in the (foreground, background), according to his mood state (green rage, ...) or to describe a mood (red fire, night blue, ...).

Some characters are caricatures (Garcimore, Roberto Benigni, Woody Allen, ...)

- This series features new historical characters (General Custer, the Lumière brothers, Lola Montez, Buffalo Bill, John Ford, Ulysses S. Grant, Queen Victoria), or literary (Sherlock Holmes, Don Quixote).
- An error seems to have occurred in the chronology of events. In episode 47, "A Bone for the Daltons", Lucky Luke states that he knows an archaeologist who he later meets for the first time in the next episode, "The Great Nose of Talisman".

== Broadcast ==
In France, the show aired on France 2 and France 3, while in Canada, it was broadcast on Télé-Québec and also shown on Teletoon in Canada, Italia 1 in Italy, Super RTL in Germany and BBC Two and CBBC in UK.

== See also ==
- List of French animated television series
- List of French television series
- Lucky Luke
