= 430 Space Shuttle =

Hong Kong television series

430 Space Shuttle (Chinese: 430穿梭機) is a children's show shown on TVB Jade in Hong Kong that aired from 1 February, 1982 until its final episode on 8 August, 1989. The name represents the show's starting time - 4:30pm. This program aimed to educate children about astronomy or related topics with stories, songs, games and other adventures. It provided an opportunity for children to learn about different topics while being entertained at the same time.

The host of the programme was Cheung Kwok Keung aka "KK", with various supporting actresses, as well as the "silver" monster Coco and the robot that hung on it, called Lobo. When the programme was airing, many families in Hong Kong still had black-and-white televisions and mistakenly believed Coco was a gold monster. Some children got disappointed when they saw the "ugly" silver body on colour TV.

430 Space Shuttle was replaced in the early 1990s by Flash Fax, another educational children's show.

Among the show's former hosts are famous Hong Kong actors Stephen Chow and Tony Leung.

== Cartoons ==
During 430 Space Shuttle, about 20 minutes were used to showcase a cartoon. These cartoons were adapted into Cantonese, and usually from Japanese animation. The first cartoon that aired during this time was Doraemon.

=== List of cartoons ===
- 《千年女王》 Queen Millennia (83/7/18)
- 《小地鼠阿曚》(No Translation)
- 《怪物小皇子》《Kaibutsu-kun (83/6/17)
- 《藍精靈》 The Smurfs (84/1/7)
- 《宇宙大帝》 Space Emperor God Sigma
- 《電子神童》 Game Center Arashi
- 《黃金戰士》 Golden Warrior Gold Lightan
- 《足球小將》 Captain Tsubasa (85/3/5, 86/5/5)
- He-Man (84/12/24)
- She-Ra: Princess of Power (86/12/26)
- 《Q太郎》 Obake no Q-tarō (86/4/7)
- 《小雙俠》 Yatterman (83/12/5)
- 《得意仔》(No Translation) (85/8/5)
- 《腦波子》(No Translation) (83/10/8)
- 《淘氣小雪兒》 Lady Georgie (85/12?)
- 《露絲小姑娘》 Lucy of the Southern Rainbow (85/11/2)
- 《幻仙沙蜜仔》(No Translation) (85)
- 《雷鳥拯救隊》 Thunderbirds 2086
- 《戰士高狄安》(Guardian)
- 《綠野仙踪》 The Wizard of Oz (86/11/29)
- 《伊索寓言》 Aesop's Fables
- 《外星小美兒》 Memole (87/5/21)
- 《小熊貓豆豆》(No Translation) (87/7/30)
- 《格林童話》 Grimm's Fairy Tales (87/8/13)
- 《故事小寶盒》(No Translation) (89/1/6)
- 《求知奇遇記》(No Translation) (89/3/28)
- 《大武士》Tōshō_Daimos

== See also ==
- List of programmes broadcast by Television Broadcasts Limited
