= Lucky Luke (1984 TV series) =

- Recurring closing scene
- Genre: Western; Adventure; Comedy; Action
- Created by: Morris
- Based on: Lucky Luke by Morris
- Written by: Glenn Leopold; Cliff Roberts
- Directed by: Morris; Joseph Barbera; William Hanna
- Opening theme: "Bang Bang Lucky Luke"
- Ending theme: "I'm a Poor Lonesome Cowboy"
- Composers: Claude Bolling; Shuki Levy; Haim Saban
- Countries of origin: France; United States
- Original languages: English; French
- No. of series: 1
- No. of episodes: 26

Production
- Executive producers: Philippe Landrot; Arturo Scott; Kay Wright
- Running time: 22 minutes
- Production companies: FR3; Gaumont; Hanna-Barbera Productions

Original release
- Network: FR3 (France); Syndication (United States)
- Release: 15 October 1984 – 8 April 1985

Related
- Lucky Luke (1991 TV series)

Lucky Luke is a Western animated television series based on the comic book series of the same name created by the Belgian cartoonist and creator of the franchise Morris. The series lasted for 26 episodes, and was co-produced by Hanna-Barbera, Gaumont and FR3. In France, the series was broadcast from 15 October 1984 on FR3. In the United States, the show aired in syndication on various CBS and ABC stations.

== Synopsis ==
Lucky Luke is a solitary street-smart cowboy traveling through the Old West. Accompanied by his faithful horse Jolly Jumper and almost every episode by Rantanplan the prison guard dog (who gets lost in the West by wanting to follow Lucky Luke or find his prison), he finds himself confronted with various bandits and thugs like the Dalton Brothers, Billy the Kid, Jesse James, and Phil Defer.

== Voice cast ==
| Character | Original | French Dub |
|---|---|---|
| Phil Defer | Michael Bell | Henry Djanik |
| Lucky Luke | William Callaway | Jacques Thébault |
| Nebraska Kid | Henry Corden | Albert Augier |
| Jack Dalton | Rick Dees | Gérard Hernandez |
| Billy the Kid | Pat Fraley | Guy Pierauld |
| Averell Dalton | Bob Holt | Pierre Tornade |
| Calamity Jane | Mona Marshall | Micheline Dax |
| Ma Dalton | Mitzi McCall | Perrette Pradier |
| Rantanplan/Bushwack | Paul Reubens | Bernard Haller (1st voice); Roger Carel (2nd voice) |
| Jolly Jumper | Robert Ridgely | Roger Carel |
| William Dalton | Fred Travalena | Jacques Balutin |
| Joe Dalton | Frank Welker | Pierre Trabaud; Roger Carel (The Black Hills) |
| Cosmo Smith | Frank Welker | Jacques Ferrière |
| Fletcher Jones | Frank Welker | Albert Augier |

=== Additional Voices ===
- Original: Jack Angel, Peter Cullen, Barbara Goodson, Jim MacGeorge, Alan Oppenheimer, Hal Smith, John Stephenson, Lennie Weinrib
- French Dub: Albert Augier (Frank Malone, Orwell Stormwind), Roger Carel (Frank James, Senator Pendelberry, Jasper, Sam Mountaineer, Professor Gustav Cranium, Coyote Will), Jean-Henri Chambois (Cass Casey), Richard Darbois (Little John the Woodcutter), Jacques Deschamps (Cole Younger, Professor Gurgle, Yellow Feather Leader), Jacques Ferrière (Colonel Drake, Doctor Doxey, Captain Barrows, Jack Rabbit, Professor Doublelap, Petit Roquet), Marion Game, Francis Lax (Jesse James, August Oyster, Barry Blunt, Waldo Badminton, Bull Bullets, Senator Wilkins), Perrette Pradier (Annabelle Phelps)

== Episodes ==
| No. | Title | Original release date |
|---|---|---|
| 1 | "Ma Dalton" | October 15, 1984 |
| 2 | "The Tenderfoot" | October 22, 1984 |
| 3 | "The Daltons In The Blizzard" | October 29, 1984 |
| 4 | "Going up the Mississippi" | November 5, 1984 |
| 5 | "Calamity Jane" | November 12, 1984 |
| 6 | "The Daltons Redeem Themselves" | November 19, 1984 |
| 7 | "Rails on the Prairie" | November 26, 1984 |
| 8 | "Phil Defer" | December 3, 1984 |
| 9 | "The Elixir of Doctor Doxey" | December 10, 1984 |
| 10 | "Outlaw" | December 17, 1984 |
| 11 | "Billy the Kid" | December 24, 1984 |
| 12 | "The Stage Coach" | December 31, 1984 |
| 13 | "The Grand Duke" | January 7, 1985 |
| 14 | "In The Shadow of the Derricks" | January 14, 1985 |
| 15 | "The Daltons' Stash" | January 21, 1985 |
| 16 | "The White Cavalier" | January 28, 1985 |
| 17 | "On the Dalton's Trail" | February 4, 1985 |
| 18 | "The Escort" | February 11, 1985 |
| 19 | "The Rivals of Painful Gulch" | February 18, 1985 |
| 20 | "The Singing Wire" | February 25, 1985 |
| 21 | "Jesse James" | March 4, 1985 |
| 22 | "Barbed Wire On The Prairie" | March 11, 1985 |
| 23 | "The Black Hills" | March 18, 1985 |
| 24 | "Dalton City" | March 25, 1985 |
| 25 | "Caravan" | April 1, 1985 |
| 26 | "Rush on Oklahoma" | April 8, 1985 |

== Production ==
The opening credits were directed by Philippe Landrot. This series is broadcast in installments of 5 minutes every day in access prime time, followed by a full broadcast on Sunday afternoon (on FR3). Three episodes ("The Daltons in the Blizzard", "Ma Dalton" and "The Daltons Are Redeemed") were combined in a compilation feature movie: The Daltons on the Loose.

The series was produced by Hanna-Barbera in the United States. During the series' production and appearance on the American television, Lucky Luke must comply with a few rules to avoid falling foul of the censorship of children's programs. First, Lucky Luke's cigarette was replaced by a blade of grass, a change that would later also occur in the comic series. Another big change is that ethnic minorities are disappearing: no more Chinese launderers, no more black servants, no more "redskin"-speaking Amerindians. The Mexicans and the undertakers are also erased as much as possible from the Lucky Luke stories (some episodes, however, leave the role of the undertakers more or less intact). This adaptation also gave the animals Jolly Jumper and Rantanplan a much more important place than in the comics.

Episodes never had the same design, which was explained by the services of several subcontracted animation studios (in the United States, Spain and Australia). Three episodes of this series (Les Dalton dans le blizzard, Ma Dalton, and Les Dalton se rachètent) were assembled together for the theatrical release Les Dalton en cavale. In some episodes of the French dub, comedian Bernard Haller was replaced by Roger Carel. Jacques Thébault, who was the voice of Lucky Luke, had dubbed James West in The Wild Wild West and Pierre Trabaut who did Joe Dalton had voiced Loveless, James West's enemy.

A second series was produced eight years later, in 1991, under the hands of IDDH located in Angoulême. A third series, produced by Xilam, followed in 2001.

== Broadcast ==
The series was first broadcast in the United States in 1983. In France, it was broadcast on FR3 in five-minute episodes in a 7:55pm timeslot from October 15, 1984 to April 8, 1985, later in 26 weekly episodes on Sundays from October 20, 1984 to April 14, 1985. during FR3 Jeunesse. The rerun started on October 27, 1985 and ended on April 13, 1986 on the same channel. Its rerun received a further rerun with the five-minute episodes airing on weeknights in a prime access slot, followed by a late-afternoon rerun of the full-length episodes on Sundays (on FR3). This rerun started on January 5, 1987 and ended on June 28, 1987. It was repeated again from October 3, 1988 to April 2, 1989. Outside France 3 it gained further reruns from October 16, 1996 on Arte, and in 2008 on Gulli.

In Quebec, it premiered on December 29, 1984 on Télévision de Radio-Canada.

== Home media ==
The complete series was released in October 2010 by Citel Vidéo in 5 volumes. The episodes are, in order:

- Ma Dalton (episodes 1, 6, 19, 22 and 13)
- The Diligence (episodes 12, 10, 2, 7, 3, 4)
- Calamity Jane (episodes 5, 9, 24, 26, 23)
- Billy the Kid (episodes 11, 15, 18, 8, 14)
- Jesse James (episodes 21, 25, 20, 17, 16)
