= Hong Kong television drama =

Hong Kong and Cantonese language cultural TV genre

Hong Kong television drama (Chinese: 香港電視劇) refers to televised dramatic programming produced mainly by the territory's two free-to-air TV networks of Television Broadcasts Limited (TVB) and Asia Television (ATV) until its license expired. Locally produced television dramas have helped contribute to a unique cultural identity among the Hong Kong population and serve as a cultural resource for the Cantonese Chinese speaking community worldwide.

== History ==
Local broadcast television in Hong Kong was first produced in 1957 with the launch of Rediffusion Television, making it the first territory in Greater China and colony of the British Empire to be served by local TV. TVB was later founded in 1967 to become the territory's first free-to-air television network. With a massive influx of refugees from Mainland China coming into a rapidly industrializing Hong Kong during the 1960s and 1970s, the television medium became a prominent force in shaping local identity and formed a cultural resource. The development of early television dramas in the 1970s and early 1980s proved to be enormously successful, with viewership of the ending for primetime serials sometimes creating ratings as high as 70%. Television dramas tended to stray away from Chinese traditionalism, with themes relating more to those of industrialized societies, such as personal survival over collective good, reflecting Hong Kong's global position as a modernizing Asian Tiger economy.

By the 1980s, television dramas had become a cultural icon of Hong Kong throughout East and Southeast Asia, with the territory becoming a center for television and film production. Furthermore, the success of the Hong Kong television industry later served as a major influence for television in mainland China and other industrializing Asian nations, most notably Taiwan and South Korea.

== Audience and reception ==
Hong Kong television dramas, along with cinema, have fostered an identity for the Cantonese speakers separate to those of Standard Mandarin. As a result, Cantonese has been able to maintain a prominent standing relative to other non-Mandarin Chinese dialects.

The success of early Hong Kong television dramas throughout East and Southeast Asia has resulted in their continued popularity throughout the regions, as well as with Chinese immigrant populations around the world. In fact, Hong Kong media became so influential in China's neighboring Guangdong Province (which is traditionally Cantonese-speaking) in the 1980s, that in 1988 the State Administration of Radio, Film, and Television allowed for the local production of Cantonese television broadcasts in order to countermeasure against Hong Kong influence. This is a notable exception from the Chinese government's strict measures against the broadcasting and public usage of local dialects, which usually must be given approval by local and national authorities. The popularity of Hong Kong television programs in Taiwan has resulted in the launch of a TVB affiliate network in the country, TVBS, with the TVBS Entertainment Channel largely rebroadcasting Hong Kong dramas. Furthermore, TVB has also created the affiliate channels of TVB Korea and TVB Vietnam in South Korea and Vietnam respectively.

Over the past decade, TVB has consistently received a much larger market share over its competitor ATV, which in turn has reported consecutive losses. Much criticism has been due to ATV's lack of variety in programming, including television dramas that are largely out of touch with Hong Kong locals, and a pro-Beijing government stance.

== Genres and subject matter ==
Subject content and themes in Hong Kong television drama often reflect the ideals and attitudes of the general populace in the present state of the territory. For example, during the rapid development of Hong Kong during the 1960s to mid-1980s, characteristics deemed too traditional, such as communal benefit that is emphasized in traditional Chinese values, were ignored in favor of "Western, industrialized values" such as personal gain and material wealth, and became reflected in drama themes. The approach of the transfer of sovereignty over Hong Kong saw themes in television dramas shift from the general optimism of growth to increased pessimism fueled by the possible consequences of Chinese rule reflected by Hong Kongers. More recently, the increasing antagonism in relations between local Hong Kong residents and mainland Chinese has also found its way as a central theme in local TV dramas. While the majority of Hong Kong television drama serials are set in the present, historical themes set in imperial China or colonial Hong Kong are also popular. Genres of modern themed serials can include, but are not limited to: criminal and/or judicial, medical, supernatural, or comedy. The martial arts genre that has become a trademark of Hong Kong cinema is also often used in imperial Chinese themed serials.

== See also ==
- Television in Hong Kong
- List of Hong Kong television series
- Cinema of Hong Kong
- C-pop
- Cantopop
- Chinese television drama
- Taiwanese drama
- Korean drama
- Japanese television drama
