= The Pondles =

- Directed by: Terry Ward
- Starring: Christopher Sandford; Jill Shilling
- Narrated by: Robin Bailey
- Country of origin: United Kingdom
- Original language: English
- No. of seasons: 1
- No. of episodes: 13

Production
- Running time: 11 minutes

Original release
- Network: CITV; Nickelodeon UK (1994)
- Release: 16 September – 16 December 1987

The Pondles is a British animated television series which consists of 13 episodes which was originally broadcast in 1987.

== Synopsis ==
The Pondles are tiny green creatures with small caps made of acorns, who live in a small village called Puddletown located in a backyard behind a thick hedge. The series focuses on the different adventures they experience in every episode.

== Episodes ==
01. The Puddletown Parade
02. The Rain Dance
03. The Three Little Jackdaws
04. The Purple Thingamabob
05. The Puddletown Puffer
06. Mustard's Mystery Machine
07. The Tortoise and the Puffer
08. Pip's Birthday
09. The Pondleberry Robbers
10. Grandad's Shed
11. The Boat Race
12. The Concertina
13. Daisy Saves the Day
