= Berry Bees =

Italian children's book series, from 2018

- Cover of the first Berry Bees book.
- Author: Cat Le Blanc
- Country: Italy
- Language: Italian
- Genre: Spy
- Publisher: Fabbri
- Published: 27 March 2018 – present
- No. of books: 6
- Website: Atlantyca

Berry Bees is an Italian children's book series by writing duo Carolina Capria and Maria Martucci, also known as Cat Le Blanc. Published on 27 March 2018 by Fabbri, the series has 6 titles so far. Two books are usually released on the same day. The books have been translated into Spanish, Catalan, Portuguese, Slovenian, French, Turkish, Russian, Romanian, Hungarian, Arabic, and Macedonian. It hasn't been translated in English yet.

== Synopsis ==
Lola, Bobby, and Juliette are a trio of girls who have exceptional talents, friendship, and a secret life. The mysterious Ms. Berry turned them into Bees agents in the B.I.A. (Bees Intelligence Agency). With their ability to hack systems, read minds, and agility, they were sent on missions that adult agents could not do.

== Books ==
1. Three Spies for a Miss/Tre spie per una miss (27 March 2018)
2. Golden Collar Mission/Operazione collare d'oro (27 March 2018)
3. The Princess Mission/Missione principessa (23 October 2018)
4. Trapped Agents/Agenti in trappola (23 October 2018)
5. Danger in Paris/Pericolo a Parigi (16 April 2019)
6. Horse Show Mission/Spie al galoppo (16 April 2019)

== TV series ==
On 16 October 2018, it was announced that an animated series based on the books was being produced. The series premiered on 9Go! in Australia on 5 October 2019.
