= Jacques Thébault =

French actor

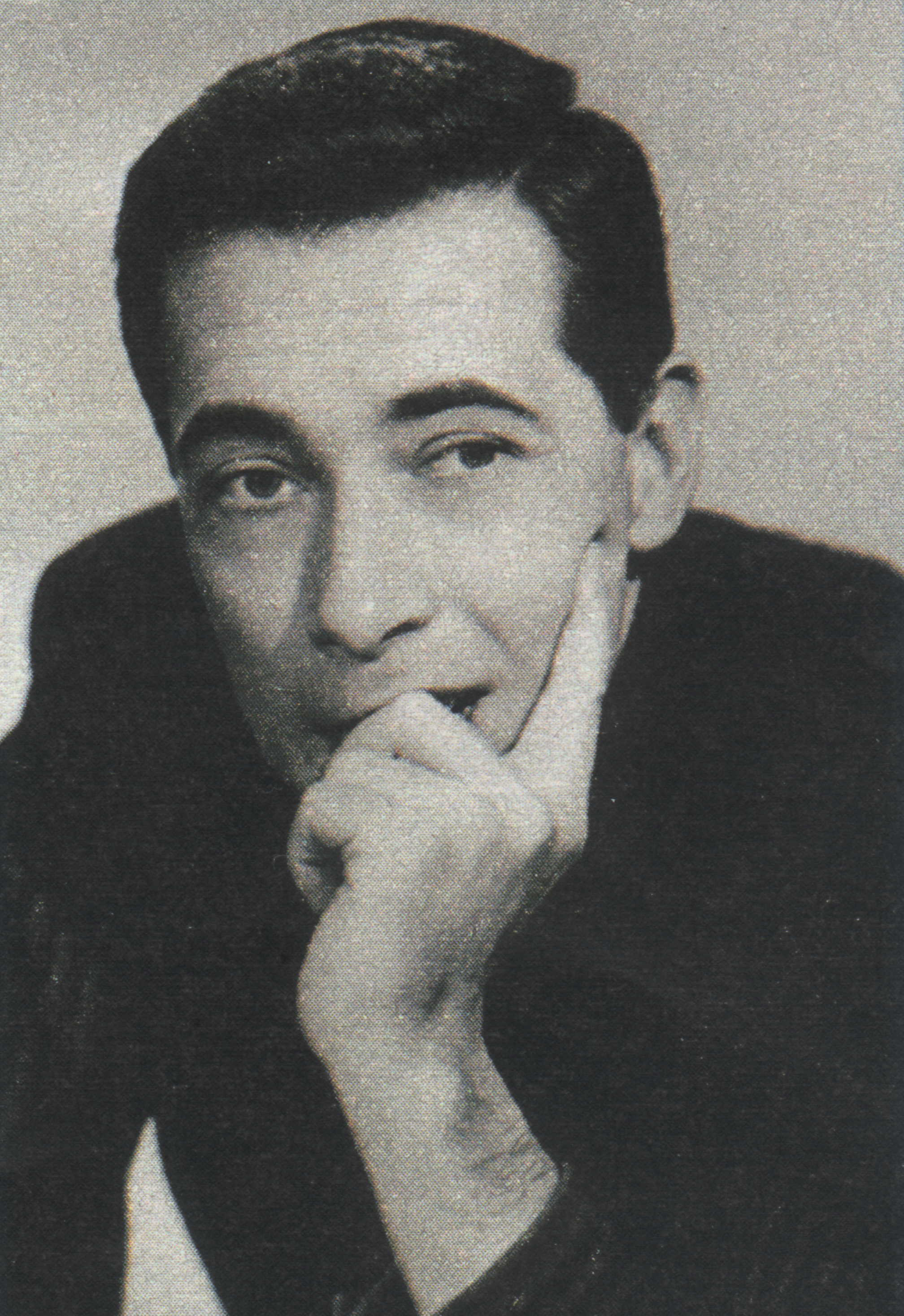
Jacques Thébault

Jacques Thébault (4 November 1924 – 15 July 2015) was a French actor. He has dubbed for or been the voice artist for:

- Robert Conrad
- Steve McQueen
- Patrick McGoohan
- Bill Cosby
- Roy Scheider
- Lucky Luke (before Antoine de Caunes)
- Jeremy Brett, from Sherlock Holmes for Granada
- One of the voice overs in Amélie.
