= List of Bluey characters =

Bluey is an Australian animated preschool television series which premiered on ABC Kids on 1 October 2018. The program was created by Joe Brumm and is produced by Queensland-based company Ludo Studio. The show follows a young girl named Bluey, an anthropomorphic six-year-old (later seven-year-old) Blue Heeler puppy characterised by her abundance of energy, imagination and curiosity about the world. The young dog lives with her father, Bandit; mother, Chilli; and younger sister, Bingo, who regularly joins Bluey on adventures as the pair embark on imaginative play together. Other characters featured each represent a different dog breed.

The child characters of Bluey are voiced by children of the program's production crew and, for privacy reasons, are not credited in the show as voice actors.

== Cast table ==
Character	Voiced by	Breed	Appearances			
Character	Voiced by	Breed	First	Series 1	Series 2	Series 3
Main characters
Bluey Heeler	Unknown (Note: An adult Bluey was voiced by Geraldine Hakewill in a flash-forward sequence in the episode "Surprise!".) (Note: Not credited for privacy reasons.)	Blue Heeler	"Magic Xylophone"	Main	Main	Main
Bingo Heeler	Unknown	Red Heeler	"Magic Xylophone"	Main	Main	Main
Bandit Heeler Dad	David McCormack	Blue Heeler	"Magic Xylophone"	Main	Main	Main
Chilli Heeler Mum (née Cattle (Note: Grandad's full name is listed as "Mort Cattle"))	Melanie Zanetti	Red Heeler	"Magic Xylophone"	Main	Main	Main
Extended Heeler and Cattle family
Muffin Heeler	Unknown	White Heeler	"BBQ"	Secondary	Secondary	Secondary
Socks Heeler	Unknown	Blue Heeler	"BBQ"	Secondary	Secondary	Secondary
Uncle Stripe Heeler	Dan Brumm	Blue Heeler	"BBQ"	Secondary	Secondary	Secondary
Aunt Trixie Heeler	Myf Warhurst	White Heeler	"BBQ"	Secondary	Secondary	Secondary
Uncle Radley Heeler	Patrick Brammall	Blue/Red Heeler mix	"Double Babysitter"		Secondary	Secondary
Aunt Frisky Heeler	Claudia O'Doherty	English Cocker Spaniel	"Double Babysitter"		Secondary	Secondary
Chris Heeler Nana	Chris Brumm	Blue Heeler	"Grannies"	Secondary	Secondary	Secondary
Grandpa Bob Heeler Bobba	Ian McFadyen (Note: "Grannies"); Sam Simmons (Note: Series 3 and Minisodes)	White Heeler	"Grannies"	Recurring	Recurring	Recurring
Mort Cattle Grandad	Laurie Newman	Red Heeler	"Grandad"		Secondary	Secondary
Aunt Brandy Cattle	Rose Byrne	Red Heeler	"Onesies"			Guest
Chilli's Mum	Kate Miller-Heidke	Red Heeler	"Dragon"			Guest
Neighbours
Pat Lucky's Dad	Brad Elliot	Labrador Retriever	"Keepy Uppy"	Secondary	Secondary	Secondary
Janelle Lucky's Mum	Anna Daniels	Labrador Retriever	"Pass the Parcel"	(Mentioned (Note: Janelle was mentioned by Pat in "Asparagus", "Shaun", and "Rug Island".))	(Mentioned)	Secondary
Lucky	Unknown	Labrador Retriever	"Keepy Uppy"	Secondary	Secondary	Secondary
Chucky	Unknown	Labrador Retriever	"Pass the Parcel"			Secondary
Wendy	Beth Durack (Note: Series 1 and 2 only); Emily Taheny (Note: Series 3)	Chow Chow	"Fairies"	Secondary	Secondary	Secondary
Judo	Charlotte Stent (Note: While Stent has revealed her role in the show, being the only member of the child cast to do so, she remains uncredited in the show.)	Chow Chow	"Butterflies"	Secondary	Secondary	Secondary
Doreen	Kelly Butler	Great Pyrenees	"Bin Night"		Recurring	Recurring
Glasshouse Primary School attendees
Mackenzie Border Collie (Note: In "Curry Quest", Bandit calls out to Mackenzie's father, revealing their surnames as Border Collie.)	Unknown	Border Collie	"Fruitbat"	Secondary	Secondary	Secondary
Rusty	Unknown	Australian Kelpie	"Calypso"	Secondary	Secondary	Secondary
Chloe	Charlotte Stent (Note: In the television series.); Unknown (Note: In Bluey's Happy Snaps.)	Dalmatian	"Bike"	Secondary	Secondary	Secondary
Honey	Unknown	Beagle	"Spy Game"	Secondary	Secondary	Secondary
Coco	Unknown	Poodle	"Shadowlands"	Secondary	Secondary	Secondary
Snickers	Unknown	Dachshund	"Shadowlands"	Secondary	Secondary	Secondary
Indy	Unknown	Afghan Hound	"Calypso"	Secondary	Secondary	Secondary
Jack Russell	Unknown	Jack Russell Terrier	"Army"		Secondary	Secondary
Winton	Unknown	English Bulldog	"Markets"	Secondary	Secondary	Secondary
Pretzel	Unknown	Chihuahua	"Calypso"	Secondary	Secondary	Secondary
The Terriers	Unknown	Miniature Schnauzer	"Calypso"	Secondary	Secondary	Secondary
Kindy attendees
Lila	Unknown	Maltese	"Daddy Dropoff"		Secondary	Secondary
Missy	Unknown	Australian Terrier	"Bob Bilby"	Secondary	Secondary	Secondary
Buddy	Unknown	Pug	"Bob Bilby"	Secondary	Secondary	Secondary
Juniper	Unknown	Shiba Inu	"Bob Bilby"	Recurring	Recurring	Recurring
Bentley	Unknown	Cavalier King Charles Spaniel	"Bike"	Recurring	Recurring	Recurring
Zara	Unknown	Cavalier King Charles Spaniel	"Fairies"	Recurring	Recurring	Recurring
Classmates' siblings
Lulu Russell	Unknown	Jack Russell Terrier	"Army"		Secondary	Secondary
Dusty	Unknown	Australian Kelpie	"Cricket"			Secondary (Note: Has a greater role in ancillary media (i.e. books).)
Digger	Unknown	Australian Kelpie	"Cricket"			Secondary
and numerous others
Other kids
Winnie	Unknown	Chocolate Labrador	"Café"		Secondary	Secondary
Jean-Luc	Unknown	Black Labrador	"Camping"	Guest	(Pictured (Note: Two drawings of him are shown on the Heelers' wall in "Bingo" and "The Show".))	
Captain	Unknown	American Foxhound	"Barky Boats"		Guest	Guest
Mia	Unknown	English Setter	"Barky Boats"		Guest	Guest
Tiny C.	Unknown	Great Dane	"Cricket"			Guest
Pom Pom	Unknown	Pomeranian	"Seesaw"		Recurring	Recurring
Dougie	Character is Deaf and uses Auslan	Cavoodle	"Turtleboy"			Guest
Other adults
Mrs. Retriever	Ann Kerr	Golden Retriever	"Bob Bilby"	Recurring	Recurring	Recurring
Calypso	Megan Washington	Blue Merle Australian Shepherd	"Calypso"	Secondary	Secondary	Secondary
Frank Chloe's Dad	Francis Stanton	Dalmatian	"Spy Game"	Recurring	Recurring	Recurring
Chloe's Mum	Hsiao-Ling Tang	Dalmatian	"Magic Xylophone"	Recurring	Recurring	
Mackenzie's Dad	Richard Jeffery	Border Collie	"Fruitbat"	Recurring	Recurring	Recurring
Mackenzie's Mum	Loren Taylor	Border Collie	"Spy Game"	Recurring	Recurring	Recurring
Rusty's Dad	Anthony Field	Australian Kelpie	"Army"		Guest	Guest
Rusty's Mum	Jane Hall	Australian Kelpie	"Explorers"			Guest
Marcus Honey's Dad	Charlie Aspinwall	Beagle	"Spy Game"	Recurring	Recurring	Recurring
Daisy Honey's Mum	Sam Moor	Beagle	"Spy Game"	Recurring	Recurring	Recurring
Maynard	Sean Choolburra	Irish Wolfhound	"Grandad"		Guest	Guest
Fido	Eliot Fish	Chocolate Labrador	"Café"		Recurring	Recurring
Cornelius Winton's Dad	Jake Bresanello	English Bulldog	"Markets"	Recurring	Recurring	Recurring
Dougie's Mum	Miranda Tapsell	Cavapoo	"Turtleboy"			Guest
Busker	Joff Bush	Irish Terrier	"Markets"	Guest	Guest	Guest
Notable guests
Surfer	Layne Beachley	Rough Collie	"The Beach"	Guest	Cameo	
Nurse	Charlotte Nicdao	Greyhound	"Bumpy and the Wise Old Wolfhound"	Guest	Guest	
Postie	Anthony Field	Catahoula Leopard Dog	"Dance Mode"		Guest	
Jack's Mum	Zoë Foster Blake	Jack Russell Terrier	"Hammerbarn"		Guest	Guest
Jack's Dad	Hamish Blake	Jack Russell Terrier	"Army"		Guest	Guest
Alfie	Robert Irwin	Dingo	"The Quiet Game"		Guest	
Bella Coco's Mum	Hsiao-Ling Tang (Note: "Shadowlands" only); Leigh Sales	Poodle	"Shadowlands"	Guest	Guest	Guest
Snickers' Mum	Vikki Ong	Dachshund	"Shadowlands"	Guest	Guest	Guest
Indy's Mum	Myf Warhurst	Afghan Hound	"Markets"	Guest	Guest	Guest
Yoga Instructor	Eva Mendes	Saluki	"Born Yesterday"			Guest
Whale Documentary Narrator	Natalie Portman	N/A (Note: Only depicted as a voiceover.)	"Whale Watching"			Guest
Major Tom	Lin-Manuel Miranda	Brown Icelandic horse (Note: Major Tom is one of the few non-dog characters in the show, being depicted as a horse.)	"Stories"			Guest
Chippy	Sam Cotton	Afghan Hound	"Tradies"			Guest
Cherry	Rhiannon Steffenson (Note: Cherry's lines in "Tradies" are muffled, and her voice actress in the episode is yet to be identified. Rhiannon Steffensen is credited as her voice actress in Bluey's Happy Snaps.)	Saluki	"Tradies"			Guest
Sparky	Mick Molloy	Pit bull	"Tradies"			Guest
Grumpy Pug	Margot Knight	Pug	"Granny Mobile"			Guest
The Terriers' Mum	Carrie Bickmore	Schnauzer	"TV Shop"			Guest
Bucky Dunstan	Rove McManus	Toy Fox Terrier	"The Sign" (Note: "The Sign" marks Bucky Dunstan's first physical appearance after an initial depiction in "Dragon".)			Guest
The Sheepdogs	Deborah Mailman; Brendan Williams	Old English Sheepdog	"The Sign"			Guest
Policeman	Joel Edgerton	German Shepherd	"The Sign"			Guest
Television Commentator	Kurt Fearnley	N/A	"Surprise!"			Guest
Gnomes
Jeremy	Unvoiced	Garden Gnome	"Hide and Seek"	Background	Background	Background
Tony	Unvoiced	Garden Gnome	"Hide and Seek"	Background	Background	Background
Gerald	Unvoiced	Garden Gnome	"Hammerbarn"		Background	
Hecuba	Unvoiced	Garden Gnome	"Hammerbarn"		Background	
Meditation Gnome	Unvoiced	Garden Gnome	"Hide and Seek"	Background		

== Main characters ==
=== Bluey Heeler ===
Bluey Heeler
- Bluey character
- First appearance: "Magic Xylophone" (2018)
- Created by: Joe Brumm
- Voiced by: Unknown (child); Geraldine Hakewill (adult)

In-universe information
- Full name: Bluey Christine Heeler
- Species: Australian Cattle Dog (Blue Heeler)
- Gender: Female
- Occupation: Student at Glasshouse Primary School
- Family: Bandit Heeler (father); Chilli Heeler (mother); Bingo Heeler (younger sister)
- Relatives: Radley Heeler (paternal uncle); Stripe Heeler (paternal uncle); Trixie Heeler (paternal aunt by marriage); Frisky Heeler (paternal aunt by marriage and godmother); Brandy Cattle (maternal aunt); Muffin Heeler (cousin); Socks Heeler (cousin); Mort Cattle (maternal grandfather); Bob Heeler (paternal grandfather); Chris Heeler (paternal grandmother); Chilli's Mum (maternal grandmother, deceased)
- Home: Brisbane, Queensland, Australia
- Nationality: Australian

Bluey Christine Heeler is a Blue Heeler puppy. A six-year-old girl who turns seven over the series' course, Bluey has a sprawling imagination and is curious, friendly, nice, well-behaved and energetic, though she sometimes can be impulsive. She enjoys having fun with her friends and family, particularly roleplaying and pretending that she is a grown-up.

Bluey has many peers, most of whom are from her class, but she has also befriended other children her age, such as a Black Labrador named Jean-Luc. Out of her friends, Mackenzie is depicted as her closest friend, and her other close friends include Rusty, best friend Chloe, Honey, Winnie, Lucky, Judo, Indy, Coco, and Missy; she has a big buddy named Mia. One of her more well-known personalities is that of a grandmother named Janet, who is depicted as a kind yet forgetful granny. Bluey is depicted as a baby in "Baby Race", a teenager in "Camping", and as an adult in "Surprise!". In the latter, Bluey, whose adult voice is provided by Geraldine Hakewill, is the mother of an unnamed daughter. Bluey's middle name, Christine, is inspired by her paternal grandmother (her "nana"), Chris.

=== Bingo Heeler ===
Bingo Heeler
- Bluey character
- First appearance: "Magic Xylophone" (2018)
- Created by: Joe Brumm
- Voiced by: Unknown

In-universe information
- Species: Australian Cattle Dog (Red Heeler)
- Gender: Female
- Occupation: Student at kindy (kindergarten)
- Family: Bandit Heeler (father); Chilli Heeler (mother); Bluey Heeler (older sister)
- Relatives: Radley Heeler (paternal uncle); Stripe Heeler (paternal uncle); Trixie Heeler (paternal aunt by marriage); Frisky Heeler (paternal aunt by marriage); Brandy Cattle (maternal aunt); Muffin Heeler (cousin); Socks Heeler (cousin); Mort Cattle (maternal grandfather); Bob Heeler (paternal grandfather); Chris Heeler (paternal grandmother); Chilli's Mum (maternal grandmother, deceased); Friskey’s Dad (great-uncle); Friskey’s Mum (Great aunt); Mary (Great aunt) Gearled (possible Uncle in some sort)
- Home: Brisbane, Queensland, Australia
- Nationality: Australian

Bingo Heeler is a Red Heeler puppy who is the younger sister of Bluey. Bingo, who is four years old (later turning five), is sweet, cute, energetic, friendly, well-behaved, curious and playful, much like her sister, but is rather sensitive and shy. Her favourite toy is a stuffed rabbit named Floppy. Bingo is depicted as a kindergarten student, and has made numerous friends there, including her best friend, a Maltese dog named Lila. Bingo is depicted as a smart, sensitive, and curious young girl. She shows an interest in bugs, taking breaks from the games she plays to observe them. One of her more well-known personalities is that of a grandmother named Rita, who is depicted as a mischievous woman who is hard of hearing. The episodes "Bingo", "Turtleboy", and "Slide" focus on her.

=== Bandit Heeler ===
Bandit Custard Heeler is a Blue Heeler who is the husband of Chilli, the father of Bluey and Bingo and the brother of Radley and Stripe, whom he enjoys playing with. He takes any role he plays in a game they devise seriously despite often being seen as reluctant and unwilling to partake in their games. He often teaches life lessons to his daughters while he plays with them, but this strains his relationship with them in some episodes. He is voiced by David McCormack, the frontman of the Brisbane-based rock group Custard.

=== Chilli Heeler ===
Chilli Heeler
- Bluey character
- First appearance: "Magic Xylophone" (2018)
- Created by: Joe Brumm
- Voiced by: Melanie Zanetti

In-universe information
- Species: Australian Cattle Dog (Red Heeler)
- Gender: Female
- Occupation: Airport security officer
- Family: Bandit Heeler (husband); Bluey Heeler (older daughter); Bingo Heeler (younger daughter)
- Relatives: Mort Cattle (father); Chilli's Mum (mother, deceased); Brandy Cattle (older sister); Radley Heeler (brother-in-law); Stripe Heeler (brother-in-law); Trixie Heeler (sister-in-law); Muffin Heeler (older niece); Socks Heeler (younger niece); Bob Heeler (father-in-law); Chris Heeler (mother-in-law)
- Home: Brisbane, Queensland, Australia
- Nationality: Australian

Chilli Heeler (née Cattle) is a Red Heeler who is the mother of Bluey and Bingo, and the wife of Bandit. While she fully partakes in her daughters' games, Chilli is much more level-headed and acts as a balance to the chaos. However, she can join in with the chaos when she sees fit. When not playing games, Chilli is depicted as a caring and comforting mother who wants the best for her daughters. While raising Bluey, Chilli, seeing Wendy's daughter Judo being the first to get sit up by herself, initially set herself the goal to get Bluey to walk before Judo could, but she failed, causing her to believe that she was a bad mother. However, she was told by Coco's mum, Bella, that she was doing good nonetheless. Ultimately, Bluey learned to walk in the kitchen when trying to hug Chilli. She enjoys playing field hockey with Trixie. She frequented Mount Coot-Tha with Frisky as teenagers, saying that she went there to "think". It is implied that Chilli has suffered a miscarriage in her past, and that her mum had died before the events of the series. She is voiced by Melanie Zanetti.

== Extended Heeler and Cattle family ==
=== Muffin Heeler ===
Muffin Cupcake Heeler is a White Heeler who is the secondary protagonist of the series, who is Stripe and Trixie's daughter, Socks' older sister and one of Bluey and Bingo's cousins. Muffin, who is three-years-old (later four), is a very energetic and loud child who can sometimes be selfish, bratty, and tantrum-prone, but is cute and has a good heart deep down. She is known to have a protracted phonological development where she struggles to pronounce the "L" and "R" sounds (e.g. "It was a vewociwaptow").

=== Socks Heeler ===
Socks Heeler is a Blue Heeler who is Stripe and Trixie's daughter, Muffin's younger sister and one of Bluey and Bingo's cousins. She is the youngest child in the Heeler family, being only one year old (later two). In earlier episodes, she barks and walks on all fours, much like a real-world puppy would, but later learns to walk and talk like the rest of her family. Later, she begins to utter full sentences, and is revealed to have been potty-trained.

=== Stripe Heeler ===
Stripe Heeler is a Blue Heeler who is the husband of Trixie, father of Muffin and Socks, one of the uncles of Bluey and Bingo, and the younger brother of Bandit and Radley. During a family trip, Stripe was bullied by Bandit, who eventually got jinxed by Radley in retaliation. Stripe is rather gentle, but is inexperienced when it comes to parenting. His wife tries to help him. He shares a friendly sibling rivalry with his brother, Bandit. He is voiced by Dan Brumm, who also works on sound production for the series.

=== Trixie Heeler ===
Trixie Heeler is a White Heeler who is the wife of Stripe, mother of Muffin and Socks, and one of the aunts of Bluey and Bingo. Trixie is caring, energetic and level-headed, particularly when it comes to parenting, and she loves spending time with her family. However, she can have arguments with Stripe about certain parenting decisions, but she can always find a middle ground. She is voiced by Myf Warhurst.

=== Radley Heeler ===
Radley Heeler is a Red/Blue Heeler mix who is the uncle of Bluey, Bingo, Muffin and Socks and the older brother of Bandit and Stripe. Radley looks out for his family and is laid-back, but has an occasional tendency to zone out; such an instance of this is him mistakenly calling Bluey a boy because of her blue fur. During his childhood, he stood up for Stripe and jinxed Bandit after he relentlessly teased his younger brother. He worked on an oil rig stationed in Western Australia and because of this, he was not able to visit his family often as he would have liked to. Radley later developed a relationship with Bluey's godmother, Frisky, who he eventually married. After learning that Frisky did not want to move west with him after their wedding, Radley decided to quit his job, moving to the city and getting a job there in order to remain close to his family. He is voiced by Patrick Brammall.

=== Frisky Heeler ===
Frisky Heeler is an English Cocker Spaniel who is Bluey's godmother, as well as Radley's wife and thus aunt to the Heeler cousins. As one of Chilli's friends, the two would frequent Mount Coot-Tha as teenagers. Prior to meeting Radley, she had a boyfriend named Bosco. Frisky met Radley while babysitting Bluey and Bingo; they eventually develop a relationship, and get married in Bandit and Chilli's backyard soon after. She also once went to a live Maroons game with Chilli and Trixie. She is voiced by Claudia O'Doherty.

=== Chris Heeler ===
Nana Christine Heeler is a Blue Heeler who is Bob's wife; Bandit, Stripe, and Radley's mother; and Bluey, Bingo, Muffin and Socks' paternal grandmother. When her granddaughters visit her house at the Gold Coast, she allows them to get what they want. In "Grannies", she and her husband, Bob, learn how to floss. In "Fairytale", she is depicted as a kind-hearted yet strict and harsh mother to Bandit, Stripe and Radley. Bandit says that the reason for her harshness was because mums "were allowed to be mean" in the 1980s. She is voiced by Chris Brumm, who was the inspiration for the character.

=== Bob Heeler ===
Grandpa Bob Heeler is a White Heeler who is Chris' husband, Bandit, Stripe and Radley's father, and Bluey, Bingo, Muffin and Socks' paternal grandfather. In the episode "Grannies", he learned to floss alongside his wife. Sometime after this, Bob traveled to India to "find himself," resulting in a long absence that went unexplained until "The Sign", where it was then revealed. He is voiced by Ian McFadyen in "Grannies"; Sam Simmons voiced a younger Bob in "Fairytale", and would go on to voice him from "The Sign" onwards.

=== Mort Cattle ===
Grandad Mort Cattle is a Red Heeler who is Chilli and Brandy's father and Bluey and Bingo's maternal grandfather. Prior to retirement, he served in the Army. He was first mentioned by Chilli in "Seesaw", telling Pom Pom's mum that he got surgery for heartworm. Despite his old age and recent surgery, Mort remains lively and energetic. He is voiced by Laurie Newman.

=== Brandy Cattle ===
Aunt Brandy Cattle is a Red Heeler who is Mort's daughter, Chilli's older sister, and Bluey and Bingo's maternal aunt. Prior to her appearance in "Onesies", she and Chilli were separated for four years. It is implied in "Onesies" that Brandy faced fertility issues, but by "The Sign", she has become pregnant. She is voiced by Rose Byrne.

=== Chilli's Mum ===
Chilli's Mum was a Red Heeler who was Mort's wife, Brandy and Chilli's mother, and Bluey and Bingo's maternal grandmother. She died at some point prior to the events of the series, but is depicted in Chilli's memory in the episode "Dragon" as a loving mother whose kind words of encouragement foster her daughter's drawing skills. She is voiced by Kate Miller-Heidke.

== Neighbours ==
=== Pat ===
Pat (often referred to as Lucky's Dad) is a Labrador Retriever who is one of the Heelers' next-door neighbours, the husband of Janelle and the father of Lucky and Chucky. He has close ties with the Heelers; he frequently involves himself with his neighbours' games, and has befriended Bandit's brother Stripe. He barracks for the Maroons along with the Heeler family and his two sons, Lucky and Chucky. He is also talented in playing the piano. He is voiced by Brad Elliott.

=== Janelle ===
Janelle is a Labrador Retriever who is one of the Heelers' next-door neighbours, the wife of Pat and the mother of Lucky and Chucky. While she does not involve herself with her neighbours' games, unlike the rest of her family, she is generally kind-hearted and wants the best for her sons. She has a good eye for planning birthday parties and keeps up with modern trends, preferring to stick with a modern version of pass the parcel while Pat suggested putting only one present in the middle (as was the case during his time), which would be met with a strong reaction at Chucky's birthday party before the kids and parents slowly began to accept it. She is the only member of her family to barrack for the New South Wales Blues, having moved from the region, so she watches their games alone. However, she joins the rest of her family in barracking for the Gold team. She is voiced by Anna Daniels.

=== Lucky ===
Lucky is a Labrador Retriever who is one of the Heelers' next-door neighbours, and the eldest son of Pat and Janelle. He is depicted as an energetic and kind boy who rarely raises his voice. While not explicitly attending Glasshouse Primary School, Lucky has numerous friends from there. He loves sports: he is proficient at cricket, and he, his father and his brother, Chucky, support the Maroons.

=== Chucky ===
Chucky is a Labrador Retriever who is one of the Heelers' next-door neighbours, and the youngest son of Pat and Janelle. Much like his brother, Lucky (whose name rhymes with his), he is playful and kind, but unlike him, is also sensitive. While not generally as sporty as his brother, Chucky likes watching football and is starting to show an interest in the sport. However, during the third game of a State of Origin series, Chucky has to choose between supporting the Maroons and the Blues, the team his mum Janelle barracks for. He ultimately barracks for the Maroons with the rest of his family. He owns a tennis ball blaster that he lends to Bluey. He is learning the piano. The book Where's Bluey? At Easter reveals that he is attending, or is a special guest at, Bingo's Kindy. (Note: Note that the books' canonicity has not been confirmed by Ludo themselves.)

=== Wendy ===
Wendy is a Chow Chow who is the mother of Judo. Having moved from England, Wendy is a sophisticated woman who initially appeared to be above the Heelers' games, but later joins in on them herself. She is very fit, having done ten years of Pilates, which allows her to lift people heavier than she is. She is also kind towards her peers, having made the Heelers five lasagnas after Bluey was born. Being from England, Wendy notably has a posh accent. She is currently voiced by Emily Taheny, having been voiced previously by Beth Durack.

=== Judo ===
Judo is a Chow Chow who is one of Bluey and Bingo's friends and neighbours; Bluey has known her since she was a baby. Being a Chow Chow, she tends to become attached to some people, such as Bluey, and her hair is very hard to clean. Judo also tended to be bossy, impatient and domineering, especially towards younger children, such as Bingo and Pom Pom, but in later episodes is receptive to cooperating when playing with Bluey and Bingo, eventually becoming closer friends to the two. It is implied that she is a child of divorce, due to her absence in most episodes that only feature Wendy. She is voiced by Charlotte Stent. Unlike her mother, Wendy, who originates from England, Judo does not have a posh accent.

=== Doreen ===
Doreen is an elderly Pyrenean Mountain Dog who is one of the Heelers' neighbours. She is sweet and kind, and tends to offer advice to any passersby. She had trouble being assertive, before Muffin showed her the ropes during a garage sale. She is voiced by Kelly Butler.

== Glasshouse Primary School attendees ==
The children of Glasshouse Primary School, a school that uses Waldorf educational principles, are taught by Calypso.

=== Mackenzie Border Collie ===
Mackenzie Border Collie, a Border Collie, is one of Bluey's closest friends. He moved to Australia from New Zealand. Mackenzie has a big heart, but prefers to get to the point when playing games. Being a Border Collie, Mackenzie is adept at herding and jumping on sheep. He has a big buddy named Captain, and his family roots for the All Blacks, much to his confusion. Out of all his friends, which include Coco, Jack and Rusty, Mackenzie has a very close relationship with Bluey. As a small puppy, Mackenzie was traumatised after being separated from his mum and thinking she had left him behind, but eventually came to terms with this. Bluey creator Joe Brumm cites Dog from New Zealand comic Footrot Flats, also a Border Collie, as an inspiration for Mackenzie's design.

=== Rusty ===
Rusty, an Australian Kelpie, is also one of Bluey's closest friends, and the best friend of Jack Russell. Living in the bush, Rusty is an athletic, adventurous, friendly and tenacious young boy who puts his friends and family above himself, but can sometimes be a bit stubborn. Rusty can be considered a male counterpart to Bluey; he shares many traits with her, including personality and appearance, and he and Bluey look very similar. Aside from his best friend Jack, Rusty's close friends include Bluey, Mackenzie, Lucky and Indy (Note: Rusty's friendship with Indy was mainly displayed in the first series, with Jack taking her place after "Army".). Rusty is quite sporty, and he aspires to play for the Australian national test cricket team when he grows up, which he ends up doing as an adult. He has two siblings, Digger, his kind and caring older brother, and Dusty, his energetic little sister whose name rhymes with his, and his father is in the army. During early development of Bluey, Rusty was named after series creator Joe Brumm's favourite childhood red kelpie, and was the main character. Brumm switched the series' focus to Bluey.

=== Chloe ===
Chloe, a Dalmatian, is Bluey's best friend. Chloe is a very sweet, smart, nice, and energetic girl who has a baby brother. She enjoys playing with Bluey and Bandit, so much that she brings some of their game ideas back home to play with her dad, Frank; who is hesitant to play due to finding it too "silly," but eventually warms up to it after they find their own way to play them. Like Judo, she is voiced by Charlotte Stent.

=== Honey ===
Honey is a Beagle who is one of Bluey's friends. Much like her parents, she wears round-rimmed glasses. However, unlike her parents Marcus and Daisy, who speak with British accents, she speaks with an Australian accent. Honey is caring and assertive towards others, but sometimes has trouble keeping up with Bluey's games. The minisode "Alongside" reveals that she maintains a neat and orderly lifestyle, is proficient at sports (playing football and netball), and is learning the piano and violin.

=== Coco ===
Coco is a Poodle who is depicted as Indy's best friend. She is one of Bluey's friends, having known her since they were babies. While sweet and good-natured, Coco can sometimes come off as controlling and impatient. She has eight other siblings, probably the reason why she tries to stand out by controlling games from lack of attention.

=== Snickers ===
Snickers is a Dachshund who is one of Bluey's friends, having known her since they were babies. While fun-loving and friendly, Snickers is aware of his skinny build and short limbs, which he considers a double-edged sword. Snickers seems to particularly enjoy pretending to be a news reporter.

=== Indy ===
Indy is an Afghan Hound who is one of Bluey's friends, whose sister was born early. A free-spirited young girl, Indy is creative and playful. Her friends include Winton, best friend Coco, Bluey, and Rusty. She has a regimented diet, leaving her unable to eat wheat, gluten, sugar, salt, dairy and food with any added ingredients.

=== Jack Russell ===
Jack Russell is a Jack Russell Terrier who is Rusty's best friend and the new kid at Glasshouse Primary School. Hailing from Victoria, (Note: According to the Russell car's number plate in "Explorers") He is very nice and friendly and loves to play with his friends, which include best friend Rusty, Mackenzie and Bluey. He is shown to have ADHD; he states that he "can't sit still or can't remember anything". He has a little sister named Lulu.

=== Winton ===
Winton is an English Bulldog who is one of Bluey's friends. He has shown difficulty in respecting personal space, but has gotten better with it over time. His parents are divorced, but his father is in a new relationship with the Terriers' mum.

=== The Terriers ===
The Terriers are triplet Schnauzer brothers. They commonly roleplay as Roman soldiers. Their mum was a single parent, but she is currently in a new relationship with Winton's father, Cornelius.

=== Pretzel ===
Pretzel is a Chihuahua in Bluey's class. Initially depicted as shy to play with his friends, he eventually becomes open to playing with them after seeing his classmates work together. He has a pet guinea pig that ran away. His parentage is unknown, but dialogue in "The Sign" shows that he is implied to have two mothers; this would make them the first LGBTQ+ characters in the series.

== Kindy attendees ==
The attendees of the Kindy are taught by Mrs Retriever.

=== Lila ===
Lila is a Maltese who is Bingo's best friend. She was initially depicted as shy and apprehensive, but came out of her shell after meeting Bingo. The two become best friends, and a flash-forward in the episode "Daddy Dropoff" shows them remaining friends throughout their future school years. Like Bingo, Lila has an affinity for bugs, saving a caterpillar that would become a butterfly that Bingo named "Flappy".

=== Missy ===
Missy is an Australian Terrier who is one of Bluey and Bingo's friends. She is in Mrs. Retriever's kindy class. Initially a shy and nervous young girl who felt terrified when playing games, she has come out of her shell in her quest to become braver. She is implied to have been adopted, due to her mother being a German Spitz and no father appearing in the show.

=== Buddy ===
Buddy is a Pug who is good friends with Bingo and the rest of the kids in Mrs Retriever's kindy class. Buddy is a loud breather and is often seen picking his nose, falling asleep at the top of the slide, or staring into space at nothing at all.

=== Juniper ===
Juniper is a Shiba Inu who is friends with most of the people and students at Mrs Retriever's school, as well as Muffin Heeler. She is the daughter of Juniper's Mum, but has an unknown father as of yet.

=== Bentley and Zara ===
Bentley and Zara are twin Cavalier King Charles Spaniels. Zara is cheerful and curious, while Bentley is small, but determined, and after many tries, makes it onto the monkey bars.

== Classmates' siblings ==
=== Lulu Russell ===
Lulu Russell is a young, chubby Jack Russell Terrier girl who is the younger sister of Jack. Originating from Victoria, Lulu is a young girl who is curious about the world around her. She is sometimes mischievous, sometimes being sassy towards others; her perceived sassiness towards others stems from her tendencies to repeat anything other people says about them. Despite that, she remains a curious and cute girl who loves her friends and family. Pre-development material for "Daddy Dropoff" initially suggests Lulu, or a character that appears like her, would take the place of Lila as Bingo's best friend. The books reveal more information about Lulu: Where's Bluey and Bingo? reveals that she is friends with Dusty, and Where's Bluey? At Easter reveals that she is attending, or is a special guest at, Bingo's Kindy.

=== Dusty ===
Dusty is a young Australian Kelpie girl with auburn-blonde hair who is the youngest sister of Rusty and Digger. A cute, exuberant and energetic little girl, she is adventurous and curious. She likes playing cricket with her family, and gets excited when Rusty bats her a catch. Ancillary material reveals that she is implied to be friends with Dougie and Lulu.

=== Digger ===
Digger is a teenage Australian Kelpie boy who is the eldest brother of Rusty and Dusty. He looks out for his younger siblings and is kind and caring. He allows Rusty to play cricket with his older friends, warning him that despite his age, he would have to brave the faster bowls. His friends include Captain, Mia, and a teenage boy named Tiny C. known for his fast bowls.

=== Other siblings ===
Lila has a younger brother who is not able to talk yet, Chloe has a baby brother, Coco has eight other siblings of varying ages, Indy has a little sister who was an early baby, and Juniper has an older brother.

== Other kids ==
=== Winnie ===
Winnie is a Chocolate Labrador who befriends Bluey upon her entrance into the same playground, where they played a game of Café with their dads serving as the customers. Over the course of the subsequent mornings, Winnie, Bluey and their fathers are drawn closer and closer to each other as they play the same game. Bandit later invites Fido and Winnie to show up for breakfast.

=== Jean-Luc ===
Jean-Luc is a Black Labrador who only appeared in season 1 episode 43 from Canada who becomes good friends with Bluey when they meet on a camping trip. He speaks French, which Bluey is unable to understand, but is able to communicate through play. Bluey is heartbroken after Jean-Luc leaves for home, but Chilli tells her she may eventually see him again. A flash-forward by the end of the episode proves this right, with Jean-Luc, who is now able to speak English, reuniting with Bluey.

=== Captain and Mia ===
Captain Hound, an American Foxhound, and Mia Setter, (Note: The sources for Captain and Mia's last names come from a piece of artwork from a Bluey animator. There is no archived link, though the image exists through a different source.) an English Setter, are the preteen-aged (Note: Mia's age has been confirmed to be twelve in the official Bluey site.) big buddies of Mackenzie and Bluey respectively. There is an implied attraction between the two of them, in spite of their buddies' friendly rivalry, which eventually leads them to have a conversation about starting high school. The two are seen attending a school fair together, and they are known to play cricket; both buddies are friends with Rusty's older brother Digger.

=== Tiny C. ===
Tiny C. is a teenage Great Dane who is friends with Captain, Mia, and Digger. A cricket player, he is known for his fast bowls, one of which catches Rusty out before the younger boy mustered the courage to bat one of his bowls.

=== Pom Pom ===
Pom Pom is a Pomeranian who is one of Bluey and Bingo's friends. While the smallest out of Bluey and Bingo's friends, Pom Pom is hardy and does not let that bring her down. She also has a squeaky high-pitched voice. The book Where's Bluey? At Easter reveals that she is attending, or is a special guest at, Bingo's Kindy.

=== Dougie ===
Dougie is a deaf Cavapoo (a mix of a Cavalier King Charles Spaniel and a Poodle) who plays with the same stuffed toy turtle Bingo finds at the park. He uses Auslan (Australian Sign Language) to communicate with his mother. He is implied to be friends with Dusty and Bingo.

== Other adults ==
=== Calypso ===
Calypso is a blue merle Australian Shepherd who is Bluey's school teacher. Being calm and level-headed, she lets her students play as a form of learning. She is known for her songs, stories, and unique methods of teaching. She is voiced by Megan Washington.

=== Mrs Retriever ===
Mrs Retriever is a Golden Retriever who is Bingo's kindy teacher. She has a bilby puppet named Bob Bilby who is the class mascot. Her students take turns taking the puppet home, and they can take it on an adventure that gets recorded in a book. She is voiced by Ann Kerr.

=== Chloe's parents ===
Frank (voiced by Francis Stanton) and Chloe's mum (voiced by Hsiao-Ling Tang) were the Dalmatian parents of Chloe. Frank dedicates his time to playing with his daughter Chloe, though he finds it difficult to fully grasp her games. Chloe's mum, however, is not much known. But she appeared in various of episodes along with Chloe's baby brother.

=== Mackenzie's parents ===
Mackenzie's dad (voiced by Richard Jeffery) and Mackenzie's mum (voiced by Loren Taylor) are both fans of All Blacks and parents of Mackenzie. Mackenzie's dad's enjoys cooking (specifically grilling and participating in neighborhood food swaps) and actively watching sports, while Mackenzie's Mum does face painting.

=== Rusty's parents ===
Rusty's parents are both Red Kelpies; Rusty's dad (voiced by Anthony Field) is in the army and is occasionally shown to be out on patrol. Not much is known about his mum (voiced by Jane Hall), but she tends to charge outside with a thong if her work is interrupted. Both parents raise three kids, Digger, Rusty and Dusty.

=== Honey's parents ===
Honey's parents, Marcus (voiced by Charlie Aspinwall) and Daisy (voiced by Sam Moor), originate from the United Kingdom; thus, they both speak with a British accent. Marcus is an archaeologist, being co-workers with Bandit, and Daisy likes the art of tea parties.

=== Maynard ===
Maynard is an elderly and eccentric Irish Wolfhound who is friends and neighbours with Mort Cattle (Bluey's grandad). Maynard lives in a little wooden house at the lake, and fishes for barramundi from his verandah. He also works at a shop that sells fishing tackle, called "Bait and Tackle". He first appears in s2 e50, "Grandad", and again in s3 e15, "Explorers". He is voiced by Aboriginal Australian comedian Sean Choolburra.

=== Fido ===
Fido is a Chocolate Labrador who befriends Bandit at a playground; the two are drawn by their respective daughters, Winnie and Bluey, to serve as customers in their game of Café. A kid at heart, the two fathers bond over many similar traits, such as an inclination to disrupt their daughters' games for their amusement and that of their offspring. He is voiced by Eliot Fish.

=== Cornelius ===
Cornelius is an English Bulldog who is Winton's father. He and his wife are recently divorced, which, according to Winton, has made him "lonely all the time." With both of their children's encouragement, he begins a relationship with the Terriers' mum, seemingly moving in with her. He is voiced by Jake Bresanello.

=== Dougie's Mum ===
Dougie's Mum is a Cavapoo who uses Auslan to communicate with her deaf son. She is voiced by Miranda Tapsell.

=== Busker ===
The Busker is an Irish Terrier who entertains others as a musician, offers music lessons, and has also officiated Radley and Frisky's wedding. He is modelled on and voiced by the show's composer, Joff Bush.

== Notable guests ==
- Surfer (voiced by Layne Beachley) – A Rough Collie with a passion for surfing.
- Nurse (voiced by Charlotte Nicdao) - A Greyhound who works at the General Hospital.
- Postie (voiced by Anthony Field) – A Catahoula Leopard Dog who works as a post office employee.
- Jack's Mum and Dad (voiced by Zoë Foster and Hamish Blake) – A pair of Jack Russell Terriers who are Jack and Lulu's parents.
- Alfie (voiced by Robert Irwin) – A dingo who works as a customer service assistant at the toy store.
- Bella (voiced by Leigh Sales) – A pink poodle who is the mother of Coco and eight other kids, who is friends with Chilli.
- Snickers' Mum (voiced by Vikki Ong) - A Dachshund who is the mother of Snickers, who is friends with Chilli.
- Indy's Mum (voiced by Myf Warhurst) - An Afghan Hound who is the mother of Indy and works at the market.
- Yoga Instructor (voiced by Eva Mendes) – A Saluki whose yoga lessons Chilli attempts to repeat while watching them on TV.
- Whale Documentary Narrator (voiced by Natalie Portman) – The narrator of a TV documentary about whales that Bluey and Bingo watch together.
- Major Tom (voiced by Lin-Manuel Miranda) – A brown Icelandic horse who lives in a field next to Bluey's school, and is given a voice within Calypso's retelling of events. Outside of the characters in the fictional series Cat Squad, he is the only voiced character in the show to not be a dog.
- Chippy (voiced by Sam Cotton) - An Afghan Hound who works under Sparky as an apprentice carpenter.
- Cherry (voiced by Rhiannon Steffensen) - A red Saluki who is the girlfriend of Chippy.
- Sparky (voiced by Mick Molloy) - A Pit bull who he acts as the lead contractor building the pond alongside his apprentice carpenter, Chippy.
- Grumpy Pug (voiced by Margot Knight) – A pug and "grouchy granny" who is very rude to everyone around her during Doreen's yard sale. She is very nasty and rudely criticises everyone.
- The Terriers' Mum (voiced by Carrie Bickmore) – The triplet Miniature Schnauzers' formerly single parent, who is now in a relationship with Winton's father, Cornelius.
- Bucky Dunstan (voiced by Rove McManus) – A Toy Fox Terrier who works as a real estate agent. He is Bandit's childhood rival, criticising his drawings of a car to the point he stopped drawing completely.
- The Sheepdogs (voiced by Deborah Mailman and Brendan Williams) – A couple who, at first, buy the Heeler family's house, but cancel the purchase and instead buy Cornelius' because it has a swimming pool.
- Policeman (voiced by Joel Edgerton) – A German Shepherd who stops Chilli on the road to check if Bluey is eligible to sit in the front seat.
- Television Commentator (voiced by Kurt Fearnley) – The commentator of a wheelchair race that Bandit watches on television.
