= The Sign (Bluey) =

- Bluey episode
- Title card
- Episode no.: Series 3 Episode 49
- Directed by: Richard Jeffery; Joe Brumm
- Written by: Joe Brumm
- Original air date: 14 April 2024
- Running time: 28 minutes

Guest appearances
- Joel Edgerton; Deborah Mailman; Rove McManus; Brendan Williams

Episode chronology
← Previous "Ghostbasket"	Next → "Surprise!"
- Bluey series 3

"The Sign" is the 49th episode of the third series of the Australian animated television program Bluey, and the 153rd episode overall. In the episode, Bluey's family—the Heelers, including her sister Bingo and their parents Bandit and Chilli—contend with selling their Brisbane home and moving away, along with an upcoming marriage between Bandit's brother Radley and Bluey's godmother Frisky.

Animated by Brisbane's Ludo Studio, and inspired by creator Joe Brumm's real-life moving experiences, "The Sign" is the show's first special episode, and also the longest, at 28 minutes. Promoted as the series 3 finale, it was produced as a test drive for a potential feature-film adaptation. It was broadcast on 14 April 2024 on Australia's ABC service (to an audience of nearly 2.3 million), and overseas on Disney's cable and streaming platforms. Reception was mainly positive, while views on the ending were mixed; various outlets also took note of the episode's emotional impact on viewers and fans. A bonus Bluey episode, "Surprise!", was released the following week.

== Plot ==
While the Heelers prepare for Rad and Frisky’s upcoming wedding, Bluey is feeling uneasy about her parents selling their house, (Note: As revealed in the previous episode, "Ghostbasket".) because Bandit has taken a better-paying job in another city. While Chilli is outwardly supportive of Bandit’s decision to move the family, she is also unsure if they are making the right decision, and Bingo is unusually calm about the situation.

At school, after Bluey reveals to the class she is moving away, Calypso reads them a pop-up book called "The Farmer". The tale concerns a character who goes through many ups and downs, facing each turn of fortune with the phrase "We'll see..." When Bluey asks what the story means, Calypso explains that everything will work out how it's supposed to. Bluey takes this to mean that her family will remain in their house, but that afternoon, a pair of Old English Sheepdogs agree to buy it, crushing her mood again.

During the wedding rehearsal, Bluey, Bingo, Muffin and Socks attempt to take down the "For Sale" sign in front of the house, thinking it will prevent the sale to the Sheepdogs. The girls believe Frisky is helping them when she tries to take the sign down for the duration of the wedding, but when she and Rad get into an argument over where they will live after their marriage, she calls off the wedding and drives away.

Chilli goes after Frisky, bringing all four girls with her. Various turns of good and bad luck befall the group before they eventually catch up to Frisky at the Mount Coot-tha Lookout, where Bluey learns that removing the sign will not prevent the sale, and also learns Chilli's own uncertainties about leaving the house. The girls attempt to use a lucky coin Bluey has found to look through a pair of binoculars, but the coin gets stuck in the slot. Muffin comments that it was not a lucky coin at all; Bluey ponders, "We'll see...", slowly learning the meaning of those words. Rad and Frisky make up, decide to stay in Brisbane, and get married at the Heeler home, with numerous guests in attendance. (Note: Among them are Chilli's sister Brandy, who is pregnant following her implied infertility issues in "Onesies", and Bandit's father Bob, who is revealed to have been on an extended trip to India following his last appearance in "Grannies".)

The next day, movers begin packing up the Heeler home, and it finally dawns on Bingo that selling the house means leaving it. Bluey attempts to calm her sister down by telling her the story about the farmer. Bandit wonders if he is making a mistake, which Chilli confirms he may be, but reassures him that they will make it together. Meanwhile, at the lookout, the Sheepdogs use Bluey's lucky coin to operate the binoculars, through which they see another house up for sale (Note: The house of Bluey's classmate Winton; he and his father appear to be moving in with the Terrier family.) that has the pool they always wanted, causing them to pull out of buying the Heeler home. Upon receiving the news, Bandit rips the "For Sale" sign out of the ground, much to the joy and relief of his family. The Heelers head back inside and later peacefully eat a takeaway dinner in the house's playroom.

== Voice cast ==
=== Main ===
- David McCormack as Bandit Heeler
- Melanie Zanetti as Chilli Heeler
- Megan Washington as Calypso
- Patrick Brammall as Radley Heeler
- Claudia O'Doherty as Frisky Heeler
- Dan Brumm as Stripe Heeler
- Myf Warhurst as Trixie Heeler
- Chris Brumm as Chris Heeler
- Sam Simmons as Bob Heeler
- Lawrence Newman as Mort Cattle
- Rose Byrne as Brandy Cattle (Note: Byrne is credited even though Brandy has no dialogue in the episode. She previously voiced Brandy in the episode "Onesies".)
- Emily Taheny as Wendy (uncredited)

The child characters are voiced by children of the series' production staff and are not credited on screen as voice actors.

=== Guest appearances ===
- Joel Edgerton as Policeman
- Deborah Mailman and Brendan Williams as the Sheepdogs
- Rove McManus as Bucky Dunstan
- Jazz D'Arcy as Cookie

== Production ==
"If you think of Bluey as a sitcom, they all have a wedding episode, so I fancied a crack. The idea lodged in my head and the story grew from there."

— Show creator Joe Brumm on the genesis of "The Sign"

Bluey is animated and produced by Brisbane's Ludo Studio for the Australian Broadcasting Corporation (ABC), with support from Screen Queensland and Screen Australia, and distribution/financing by BBC Studios. The program explores playtime, imagination, and family life as seen and experienced through the titular character, a Blue Heeler puppy, and her family and friends.

Promoted as its third-series finale, (Note: The actual third-series finale would be the unpromoted episode "Surprise!".) "The Sign" is Bluey's first special episode, as well as its longest at 28 minutes in length; Amy Amatangelo of the Los Angeles Times likened it to a two-hour film by the show's standards. According to Ludo co-founder Daley Pearson, the episode serves as a potential test drive for a feature-length installment, and will be followed by Series 4 on a future date. It was also inspired by show creator Joe Brumm's real-life moving experiences, and makes many references to previous Bluey episodes.

On the "epic" scope of "The Sign", two of the program's personnel said:

It's actually quite Shakespearean in a comedy for it to end with a wedding, so it just feels momentous and joyous. There's a lot that gets explored that we can't really do in seven minutes and I think that's one of the exciting things about the 28-minute episode.

— Melanie Zanetti

We always said wouldn't it be incredible if we could do three seasons and a movie. We would love to do beyond that but that wouldn't be an Everest to climb. I think this is a version of delivering on that promise. It was such a great creative challenge that we had to do it.

— Daley Pearson

Episodes of Bluey are made by four different teams at Ludo; "The Sign" was the first time they worked on one together, "a big production challenge in itself" in Pearson's words. Zanetti and David McCormack recorded their lines in a two-part session, not knowing in the process how the story would end or if the Heelers' move would succeed. The episode also featured guest appearances by Rove McManus (as real-estate agent Bucky), Joel Edgerton (as a roadside policeman), and Deborah Mailman and Brendan Williams as the couple who nearly purchase the Heeler home.

In December 2024, Brumm announced that "The Sign" would be his final writing credit for the series to date, as he would be taking a hiatus from writing episodes in order to focus on The Bluey Movie.

== Music ==
As with the rest of the program, Joff Bush served as composer of "The Sign", and contributed with an extended version of the Series 2 cue "Dance Mode". Megan Washington, the voice of Calypso, performed a re-recording of "Lazarus Drug" (from her 2020 album Batflowers) during the final scene; Brumm "fell in love with" the song in 2020, and planned to use it on Bluey sometime afterward. During a preview screening of the episode, Washington was "moved to tears" when the song played, and later said that its appearance was "a small miracle" for her and "a beautiful crossover." The score for The Sign won the 2024 APRA Screen Music Award for Best Music for Children's Television; it is the third episode of Bluey to win the award after "Teasing" and "Flat Pack". The score also won the AACTA Award for Best Original Music Score in Television.

== Themes ==
- Bluey: "Why do stories always have happy endings?"
- Calypso: "I guess because life will give us enough sad ones."

— Dialogue from "The Sign", which Utah's Deseret News found reflective of the episode's exploration on the challenges children face while moving.

"The life lesson [in 'The Sign']," wrote Jack Seale of The Guardian, "is that adults sometimes have to make major life changes, and that although these might look as if they will cause unhappiness, it is hard to know what is around the corner – especially since the grownups themselves don't know either." The episode's message about dealing with life's uncertainties and hoping for the better was noted by Amatangelo, as well as Andy Swift of TVLine. The assurance Calypso, Bluey's teacher, gives her on fairytales having happy endings "was real as hell. Was that lesson part of her school-approved curriculum?" wondered Swift. "Probably not. But it's a literal dog-eat-dog world out there, and she'll be damned if she doesn't prepare these puppies for it." Vulture's Kathryn VanArendonk deemed the Heelers' decision to stay "electrifying, ecstatic news" for Bandit's relatives, and also found it "a bizarre choice for a children's show that has, until this point, prioritized empathy and acceptance toward normal life events that cause real anxiety and turmoil for young kids." In the National Catholic Reporter, Eric A. Clayton said, (Note: In reference to this essay: Gilbert, Sophie (15 April 2024). "Is This the End for Bluey?". The Atlantic. ISSN 2151-9463. OCLC 1399171809. Archived from the original on 16 April 2024.) "I don't know if Bandit was clinically depressed [over the prospects of moving], but I do believe he was—to use a bedrock term of the Ignatian tradition—in a state of desolation." Thomas Mitchell of The Sydney Morning Herald saw the episode as a commentary on Australia's housing crisis.

As Oliver Brandt of Men's Journal surmised, "The Sign's" plot echoed the undertones of a venerable Australian proverb, "She'll be right", which is used to express uncertainty during a given situation. Moreover, the episode references Chinese philosophy through the tale of The Farmer—from the ancient Chinese text The Huainanzi—according to Julian Glassman of The Mary Sue.

Amanda Yeo of technology-news site Mashable stated that "fans [responded] with disbelief, sorrow, and denial" over the reveal of the "For Sale" sign at the end of the preceding episode, "Ghostbasket". As Yeo added, "The idea that we may have to say goodbye to this series stalwart [the Heeler house] is not one many viewers care to contemplate." Various U.S., Canadian, British, and New Zealand outlets reported that audiences were largely left in tears while watching "The Sign", and were worried over whether the show would end with it.

== Release and marketing ==
"The Sign" was announced by the ABC in early November 2023. A teaser was released on the 14th of that month, and a trailer the following 25 March; the day before it aired, Ludo uploaded a "Previously on..." recap on YouTube covering all three series. The lead-up to its broadcast was shrouded in secrecy on BBC Studios' part.

Following 7 April's prelude episode "Ghostbasket", "The Sign" aired on 14 April 2024 on ABC Television/ABC Kids and ABC iView in Australia, along with Disney+ and Disney Junior/Disney Channel outlets elsewhere; it also premiered on New Zealand's TVNZ+ on the 22nd. On its broadcast day, a crowd of hundreds gathered at Melbourne's Federation Square for a special screening.

In advance of "The Sign's" premiere, the Heeler family's home was "listed" (with an address in Brisbane's Oxley suburb) on Domain, an Australian real-estate site. Almost two weeks after the episode aired, Zillow launched a commercial paying homage to it, produced by Ryan Reynolds' Maximum Effort company. Featuring real-life dog actors who resembled the original animated characters, it was narrated by the series' sound designer Dan Brumm (who also voices Uncle Stripe).

A graphic novel adaptation titled Bluey: The Sign was released on 4 November 2025.

"The Sign" was later released in Japanese theatres on 12 June 2026.

== Reception ==
=== Ratings ===
Over its first two ABC airings, "The Sign" received an audience of 2,288,000 viewers, topping Australia's National TV Audience (OzTAM) ratings chart. It is currently the highest-rated Bluey broadcast in Australia; previously, series two's "Easter" held that feat. During its first week on the platform, the episode received 10.4 million views globally on Disney+. (Note: According to Variety, "a view [is] defined as total stream time divided by runtime.") The day after its premiere, Canada's CBC News reported that users on the IMDb site gave it a 9.9 rating.

=== Critical analysis ===
"The Sign" received positive reviews during and after its initial broadcast. Jack Seale declared, "It's animated Australian canines' answer to Killers of the Flower Moon. But there is no need to be concerned: everything that makes Bluey magic is intact." Andy Swift called the episode "a thrilling half hour of television — a fast-paced, sharply-written, deeply thoughtful examination of the human spirit." Joel Keller of the New York Post's Decider service awarded it a "Stream It" rating. "There are a few padded moments, like the story about the farmer," he added, "but Brumm and company have come up with a story that manages to fill the time quite well, as well as do the show's usual job at making both kids and adults laugh their butts off one minute and then have the adults reaching for the tissues the next." Julia Glassman gave it "5/5 For Sale Signs", and also took note of its "meta-narrative" approach in which "the show subtly [comments] on the fact that it's a show." Sarah Shachat of IndieWire called Joff Bush's work "one of the best TV scores". Quoted in The Canberra Times, Liz Giuffre said, "The ultimate wedding television...[this episode] rewarded longtime viewers", and "is destined to join [its] forebears as part of the history of Australian screen weddings."

Despite this level of acclaim, the episode's ending received a mixed reception. Kathryn VanArendonk found it "oddly unrealistic...[and] disappointing to the point of frustration, a departure from Bluey's usual ease in navigating complex emotions... a fairy tale that also feels like a cop-out." She added, "But as an ending, or as a way to transition the series into a new phase, 'The Sign' is like so much of Bluey: perfect and devastating." Meg Walter of the Deseret News suggested that young viewers "[deserve] a different ending" based in reality, and that Bandit's "last-minute decision might install false hope" in children moving to new cities. Collider's Kendall Myers wrote, "[While] few Bluey episodes are as much of an emotional rollercoaster as [this one]...the unexpected end [makes] the lesson fall flat. Though the longer episode is well-paced, engaging, and overall as good as any other installment, the backtracking in Bluey's storyline is a major flaw, as it isn't in line with what the series is all about." Conversely, Glassman praised the Heelers' decision to stay, leading to anticipation of future stories about the cattle-dog family.

== Sequel ==
Speculation on an extra episode following "The Sign" was discussed among fans and by The Mary Sue, with Bloomberg News reporting on Brumm's confirmation. Like "Cricket" before it, "Surprise!", which was promoted by ABC Kids' social media accounts the day before, premiered on 21 April on the channel as part of a surprise release. Alongside a first-look image, Disney announced on 20 April 2024 that this episode, titled "Surprise!", would air the following morning on their outlets. The regular-length story features Bluey and Bingo playing two different games with Bandit, and an epilogue set in the near future in which a grown-up Bluey and her child pay a visit to her parents. In the episode, Chilli refers to the incident of almost moving house from the previous episode. Much like "Ghostbasket" and "The Sign", "Surprise!" was released on Disney+ the same day as its premiere on ABC Kids.
