= Cricket (Bluey) =

- Bluey episode
- Title card
- Episode no.: Series 3 Episode 47
- Directed by: Richard Jeffery; Joe Brumm
- Written by: Joe Brumm
- Original air date: 11 June 2023
- Running time: 7 minutes

Episode chronology
← Previous "Slide"	Next → "Ghostbasket"
- Bluey series 3

"Cricket" is the 47th episode of the third series of the Australian animated television program Bluey, and the 151st episode overall. It first aired on ABC Kids in Australia on 11 June 2023. In the episode, Bluey's father, Bandit narrates a story that happened to one of Bluey's friends, Rusty, in which he tries his best to become a successful cricket player who spends his time trying to perfect his techniques.

The episode was animated by Brisbane's Ludo Studio and was directed by Richard Jeffery and co-directed and written by series creator Joe Brumm. Upon release, the episode attained critical acclaim from audiences and sportswriters, and soon became widely regarded as one of the best episodes of Bluey.

== Plot ==
Bandit recounts a cricket match involving himself, Stripe, and Pat as they try to get Rusty out during a game at an unknown child's birthday party. As present-day cricket unfolds in the park, Bluey bowls to Bingo, who accidentally knocks over the stumps, getting herself out. Stripe takes the bat next and smashes Bandit's delivery for a six and out, prompting Pat to ask who is left to bat. Bluey mentions Rusty, who is found teaching fielding to his younger sister, Dusty. Though Bluey finds cricket boring and wants to switch to playing tiggy, Bandit insists on continuing, saying they will stop once Rusty is out, unaware of just how difficult that challenge will be.

Rusty steps up and immediately proves his skill, confidently hitting Bandit's deliveries despite the other fathers' attempts to outwit him. Flashbacks reveal Rusty's dedication: he practices alone obsessively, trains his square cut with incredible precision, and even teaches himself to hit moving targets. In the park, he reads Bandit's spin and delivers clean shots, leaving Snickers struggling to return the ball. The dads hatch a plan to exploit Rusty's weaknesses, but his home training, especially his mastery of the square cut thanks to repeated backyard mishaps, causing their strategy to fail, as he places the ball perfectly between fielders.

Stripe tries spin bowling next, targeting a crack on the pitch, but Bandit doubts the tactic. A flashback shows Rusty playing on Jack's rough yard, getting used to uneven pitches. Thanks to that experience, he comfortably hits Stripe's unpredictable delivery. Bandit notes that every batter has a weakness, and for Rusty, it is facing fast bowlers, because Rusty's early struggles were with his older brother Digger's friends, particularly a fearsome bowler named Tiny. Initially overwhelmed and even hurt by Tiny's deliveries, Rusty slowly builds courage. A letter from his deployed dad encourages him to step up rather than back down, inspiring Rusty to finally stand his ground and hit a pace ball for four.

Back at the park, Pat delivers a fast ball, which Rusty dispatches with a pull shot. As lunch is called, Pat insists on one more try. Bandit narrates that Rusty would happily play all day, simply for the love of the game. The real reason Rusty loves cricket is revealed in a flashback to a game of cricket that his family played on the beach, including his father. In the final delivery, Rusty, who could easily smash the ball, instead chooses to give his sister a chance, gently lobbing the ball for her to catch. Bandit tells Bluey that this gesture, choosing team over ego, is what cricket is truly about. Rusty then imagines him standing right next to himself, now grown up and participating for the Australian national cricket team at the Gabba, and young Rusty fist-bumps his adult self.

== Production ==
"Cricket" entered production in November 2020 after Ludo Studio greenlit a third series in October 2020 due to the success of the second series. The episode was teased through an interview with Joe Brumm on 8 July 2022. The production team began development on the episode as one revolving around Bandit telling a story about the game Red Rover. The Red Rover episode revolved around a flashback in the 1980s, with a young Stripe mustering up the courage to play the game with Bandit and Radley. They shelved the idea as many schools banned the game due to its potential to cause physical harm and out of fear audiences would presumably imitate it. The creators spun off the 1980s flashback episode into its own episode, titled "Fairytale", and swapped the character who would build courage to play from Stripe to Rusty. The episode also instead revolved around the game of cricket, which is a popular sport played in Australia.

== Release ==
"Cricket" originally aired on ABC Kids in Australia as the 47th episode for the third part of the third series, debuting to an audience of around 563,000 viewers, coinciding with the 2023 World Test Championship final. Initially, the previous episode, "Slide", was going to be the last episode aired out of the batch, but "Cricket" was aired as a surprise release.

Additionally, in certain regions, Disney+ added "Cricket" to its platform on 12 January 2024 alongside much of series 3. The episode was later included on home media releases for series 3 that released in the United States on 28 May 2024.

=== Merchandise ===
"Cricket" was one of the many episodes of Bluey that received a book adaptation. The book was released in December 2023. Dusty has appeared in ancillary material, including newer entries in the Where's Bluey? book series. Music from the episode, featuring a contribution from Pluto Jonze, was featured as part of the Rug Island album, released in 2024. Dusty was added to the mobile game Bluey: Let's Play! on 23 July 2025. An action figure of Rusty and Dusty was released in January 2026, and figures in the Bluey Fuzzies line, based on this episode and including Rusty and Dusty, were showcased at Moose Toys' booth at Toy Fair 2026.

== Reception ==
"Cricket" has garnered general acclaim, with the episode receiving a hugely positive response from audiences. Nick Miller and Caitlin Cassidy of The Guardian have explained that audiences consider the episode one of Bluey's best due to its heartfelt nature and its compelling story of how a cricketer growing up trains for the game. The episode has also been praised by sportswriters for explaining the rules of cricket well to children and to people who are unfamiliar with the sport.

Fans voted "Cricket" into first place during Blueyfest, an online competition held from 23 October 2023 to 6 November 2023 for fans to vote for their choice for the top 100 Bluey episodes that would air for a marathon on ABC Kids to celebrate the show's five-year anniversary on 19 November.
