= List of Bluey episodes =

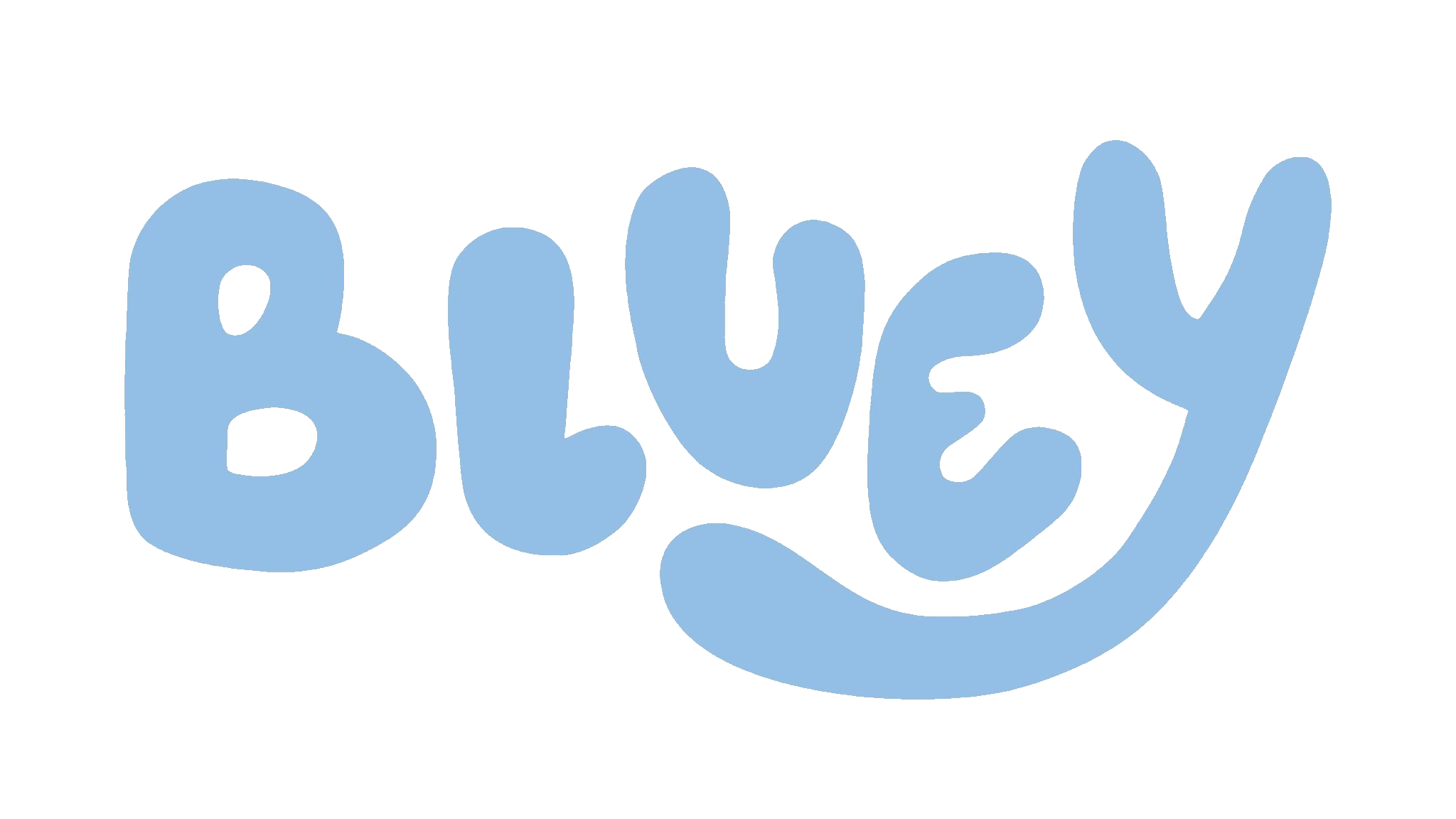

Bluey is an Australian animated television series for preschoolers that premiered on ABC Kids on 1 October 2018. The series was created by Joe Brumm with Queensland production group Ludo Studio. The show follows Bluey, an anthropomorphic six (later seven)-year-old Blue Heeler puppy who is characterised by her abundance of energy, imagination and curiosity about the world. The young dog lives with her father, Bandit; mother, Chilli; and younger sister, Bingo, who regularly joins Bluey on adventures as the pair embark on imaginative long play together. Other characters featured are each depicted as a different dog breed, some inspired by dogs from Brumm's childhood. Overarching themes include the influence of a supportive family, Australian culture, and the importance of play throughout childhood. The program was created and produced in Queensland; its capital city, Brisbane, inspires the show's setting. The series was co-commissioned by the Australian Broadcasting Corporation and the British Broadcasting Corporation. BBC Studios hold global distribution and merchandising rights. The international broadcasting rights to the series were acquired by Disney in 2019.

Since its debut on 1 October 2018, Bluey has broadcast 154 episodes across three series. Two Christmas-themed episodes have aired, as part of both the first ("Verandah Santa") and second series ("Christmas Swim"), and an Easter-themed episode ("Easter") aired as part of the second series. The third series contained a Father's Day-themed episode ("Perfect"), as well as a special 28-minute episode titled "The Sign". A collection of one-to-three minute shorts under the category of "Minisodes" aired throughout 2024. A feature-length film was announced on 17 December 2024, and is scheduled to be released theatrically worldwide on 6 August 2027, with Brumm announcing that the film will be his final writing credit for the show before stepping back.

Richard Jeffery won an Australian Directors' Guild Award in 2021 for his direction of the episode "Sleepytime"; the episode itself won the 2022 Prix Jeunesse International Award in the category of TV – Up to 6 Years Fiction (Children's). The musical scores for specific episodes of Bluey have been nominated for APRA Screen Music Awards, credited to Joff Bush as the composer. These include "Teasing" and "Flat Pack", which were both nominated for Best Music for Children's Television in 2019 and 2020 respectively. The episode "Cricket" received praise from sportswriters. Selected episodes have also been adapted into picture books, including "The Beach", which won the Australian Book Industry Awards for Book of the Year and Children's Picture Book of the Year (Ages 0–6) in 2020. Episodes have also been released in volumes on DVD in Australia, distributed by BBC Studios.

== Series overview ==
Series	Episodes		Originally released	
Series	Episodes		First released	Last released
1	52	26	1 October 2018	26 October 2018
1	52	26	1 April 2019	12 December 2019
2	52	26	17 March 2020	11 April 2020
2	52	26	25 October 2020	4 April 2021
3	50	26	5 September 2021	16 December 2021
3	50	11	13 June 2022	23 June 2022
3	50	10	9 April 2023	11 June 2023
3	50	3	7 April 2024	21 April 2024

== Episodes ==
=== Series 1 (2018–2019) ===
No. overall	No. in series	Title	Storyboarded by	Written by	Original release date	Australian viewers
Part 1
1	1	"The Magic Xylophone"	Chris Voigt	Joe Brumm	1 October 2018	N/A
Bandit uses Bluey as a pretend piano, in which Bingo begs to have a turn. When they rediscover a magical xylophone which can freeze Bandit in a position, she gets upset that Bluey is not sharing the toy with her. Bluey learns that taking turns is an important part of playing.
2	2	"Hospital"	Jasmine Moody	Joe Brumm	2 October 2018	141,000
Bandit is admitted into an imaginary hospital, where Bingo acts as the nurse and Bluey acts as the doctor. They perform an operation on Bandit to relieve him from his stomach pains, pretending that there is a cat stuck inside him that needs to be lured out.
3	3	"Keepy Uppy"	Mike Chavez	Joe Brumm	3 October 2018	122,000
Bluey blows up her last balloon and plays a game of "keepy uppy" with Bingo, where they must try to keep the balloon in the air for as long as possible. The sisters call upon Bandit to make the game more challenging, which leads to an outdoor chase to protect the balloon from popping on the grass.
4	4	"Daddy Robot"	Mike Chavez	Joe Brumm	4 October 2018	177,000
Bluey and Bingo summon "Daddy Robot" to tidy their playroom, with Bandit pretending to follow their commands. However, when the robot malfunctions, the sisters realise the importance of cleaning up their messes themselves.
5	5	"Shadowlands"	Jasmine Moody	Joe Brumm	5 October 2018	156,000
While on a picnic, Bluey plays a game of "Shadowlands" with Snickers and Coco, where they must travel across the park by only stepping on shadows. Bluey tries to teach Coco how to solve problems and follow the rules instead of taking shortcuts to make the game easier.
6	6	"The Weekend"	Jasmine Moody	Joe Brumm	6 October 2018	153,000
Bluey and Bingo are excited to spend the weekend at home playing games with Bandit. While Bingo is pretending to be a magical statue that mysteriously moves around, she finds a walking leaf insect, but is upset when Bandit is too preoccupied with the game to notice her calling.
7	7	"BBQ"	Mike Chavez	Joe Brumm	7 October 2018	109,000
Bandit and Chilli host a barbecue for Uncle Stripe and Aunt Trixie, while Bluey and Bingo roleplay their own barbecue with their cousins Muffin and Socks. Bingo is tasked with preparing the salad, and searches the garden for the best plants to use.
8	8	"Fruitbat"	Chris Voigt	Joe Brumm	8 October 2018	169,000
At bedtime, Bluey is disappointed the day is over and is unwilling to go to sleep. She learns that fruit bats are nocturnal and wishes that she could become one herself to be able to stay awake during the night. She decides to dream of being a fruit bat instead.
9	9	"Horsey Ride"	Chris Voigt	Joe Brumm	9 October 2018	162,000
Bluey forgets to put her special toy away when her cousins and Uncle Stripe come to visit, leading Socks to find the toy and insist on gnawing on it. The children decide to imagine their fathers are horses and stage a horse wedding to distract Socks from chewing on Bluey's toy.
10	10	"Hotel"	Jasmine Moody	Joe Brumm	10 October 2018	140,000
Bluey and Bingo run a pretend hotel at home, where Bandit books a room for the night and asks not to be disturbed. The sisters intrude on their guest's night, but Bingo gets upset when Bluey is being bossy and makes all of the decisions with their game.
11	11	"Bike"	Jasmine Moody	Joe Brumm	11 October 2018	135,000
Bluey becomes discouraged while learning to ride a bike, and notices that her friends and family around her are struggling with challenges of their own. She watches as they find the determination to overcome their obstacles and is inspired to persevere with her own goal.
12	12	"Bob Bilby"	Mike Chavez	Joe Brumm	12 October 2018	177,000
Bingo is given her kindergarten's class puppet, Bob Bilby, to take home for the weekend. Bluey and Bandit help Bingo take photographs of Bob Bilby for the scrapbook, but when the family realises they are spending too much time using technology, they set out to make Bob Bilby's visit the most exciting one yet.
13	13	"Spy Game"	Mike Chavez	Joe Brumm	13 October 2018	154,000
During a community barbecue at the park, Bluey and Bingo pretend to be spies on a mission with their friends. When Bingo stops playing and the game starts to fall apart, Bluey realises her sister's importance to the team and persuades her to rejoin the game.
14	14	"Takeaway"	Mike Chavez	Joe Brumm	14 October 2018	159,000
Bluey and Bingo join Bandit to collect his takeaway dinner, but must wait with him at the restaurant until his order is completed. Bandit tries to control his restless children while they wait, but ultimately realises that they should be allowed to have fun while they are still young.
15	15	"Butterflies"	Jasmine Moody	Joe Brumm	15 October 2018	153,000
Bingo feels intimidated by Bluey's friend Judo while they are playing together, reenacting the life cycle of a butterfly. When Judo encourages Bluey to abandon her sister and play elsewhere, Bingo is saddened. Bluey returns to apologise and they all learn how to play together.
16	16	"Yoga Ball"	Mike Chavez	Joe Brumm	16 October 2018	151,000
While Bandit spends the day working from home, Bluey and Bingo steal the yoga ball chair from his desk and insist that he play with them. Bingo feels disheartened when Bandit is being too rough with her while playing games, and with Chilli's help, she asks him to be more gentle.
17	17	"Calypso"	Chris Voigt	Joe Brumm	17 October 2018	124,000
Calypso facilitates a day at school and assists the children as they all engage in imaginative play together. Among the various games, Bluey runs a pretend fish and chip shop and hires Indy to work as a waitress, while Pretzel takes time to think of something to play.
18	18	"The Doctor"	Jasmine Moody	Joe Brumm	18 October 2018	153,000
Bluey works at an imaginary doctor's office, managing the appointments for Bingo while she pretends to be the doctor. Honey conjures up a pretend injury, but is disappointed when a long queue of walk-in patients take precedence over her in being attended to.
19	19	"The Claw"	Jasmine Moody	Joe Brumm	19 October 2018	183,000
Bluey and Bingo find a claw machine at a local complex and are disappointed when they are unable to win a prize. Chilli and Bandit create their own imaginary claw game at home to cheer them up, and Bandit tries to teach the children a lesson in the process.
20	20	"Markets"	Chris Voigt	Joe Brumm	20 October 2018	120,000
After a visit from the tooth fairy to reward a lost tooth, Bluey decides to spend the money she received at the local markets. Bluey searches the stalls for somewhere to make a purchase, but struggles to find an option that both she and Indy can enjoy together.
21	21	"Blue Mountains"	Chris Voigt	Joe Brumm	21 October 2018	155,000
Bluey, Bingo, and Chilli roleplay a story about two sisters and a fairy who journey across the Blue Mountains. They use their hands as puppet characters and pretend Bandit is the mountains while he sleeps. The characters encounter a suspicious fox when Bandit awakes.
22	22	"The Pool"	Chris Voigt	Joe Brumm	22 October 2018	139,000
Bandit, Bluey, and Bingo leave in rush for Uncle Stripe's pool and neglect to bring their important swimming equipment, including pool floats, sunscreen, and rashies. The trio struggle to enjoy the hot day without the equipment, which Chilli later brings, teaching them that boring tasks are still important.
23	23	"Shops"	Suzy Brumm	Joe Brumm	23 October 2018	155,000
Bluey and her friends set up a pretend shop for a roleplaying game. Mackenzie becomes frustrated when Bluey spends too long making up rules and deciding the details of the scenario. The friends learn how to assign suitable roles to each other in order to enjoy the game.
24	24	"Wagon Ride"	Jasmine Moody	Joe Brumm	24 October 2018	120,000
Bluey and Bingo ride in a wagon, pulled by Bandit, while on their way to the monkey bars. Bluey and Bandit develop a strategy to prevent her agitation when he stops to talk to other adults. Bluey learns a lesson in patience by watching Bingo entertain herself.
25	25	"Taxi"	Chris Voigt	Joe Brumm	25 October 2018	153,000
Bluey drives a pretend taxi, with Bandit and Bingo acting as passengers being transported to the airport, while Chilli provides the voice for the imaginary satellite navigation device. When the car breaks down, Bandit is forced to run on foot in order to board his flight.
26	26	"The Beach"	Mike Chavez	Joe Brumm	26 October 2018	157,000
On a family trip to the beach, Chilli decides to go for a walk by herself, and when Bluey wants to join her, she follows her mother's footsteps along the shore and enjoys the sights along the way. While walking alone for the first time, she tries to be brave, and eventually catches up to her mother.
Part 2
27	27	"Pirates"	Jasmine Moody	Joe Brumm	1 April 2019	166,000
Bluey, Bingo, and Missy pretend to be pirates on the hammock swing at the playground. Missy is frightened of the rough journey on the imaginary ship, but faces her fear to rescue her friends from inside the stomach of a whale.
28	28	"Grannies"	Ellie Goggin	Joe Brumm	2 April 2019	214,000
Bluey and Bingo dress up as grandmothers, but disagree on if grandmothers are able to perform the floss dance or not. Bluey proves that they are not by video calling Nana, but when this upsets Bingo, Bluey decides to teach Nana the dance so that Bingo will keep playing.
29	29	"The Creek"	Jim Byrt	Joe Brumm	3 April 2019	189,000
Bandit takes Bluey, Bingo, and Mackenzie to the creek after they grow tired of the local playground. Bluey struggles to appreciate the beauty of the natural world surrounding her, until they arrive at the water. Bluey learns to step out of her comfort zone and try new things.
30	30	"Fairies"	Paul Kassab	Joe Brumm	4 April 2019	194,000
When the Heelers suspects that their house has been invaded by fairies, they go on a hunt to search for and capture the invisible creatures. Bandit accidentally hurts Bingo's feelings and makes it up to her by outsmarting the fairies.
31	31	"Work"	Jasmine Moody	Claire Renton; Joe Brumm	5 April 2019	198,000
Bluey and Bingo roleplay a day at work, with Bandit acting as the boss of a drainpipe factory who hires the girls after their successful interviews. The day takes a turn when Bluey takes control of the company and fires Bandit for his breach of the strict "no dancing" rules.
32	32	"Bumpy and the Wise Old Wolfhound"	Jasmine Moody	Joe Brumm	6 April 2019	196,000
When Bingo is sick and in the hospital, she receives a video from Bluey; a short film she has made with Bandit and the family. The story is about a young dog called Bumpy who gets sick and her owner, Barnicus, who supports her through the period of difficulty.
33	33	"Trampoline"	Chris Voigt	Joe Brumm	7 April 2019	261,000
Bandit plays on the trampoline with Bluey and Bingo before he has to leave for work. The sisters devise a plan to get him to stay; pretending to feed him breakfast on the trampoline. Before leaving, Bandit tells Bluey that she has an important job too: to continue making up games.
34	34	"The Dump"	Chris Voigt	Joe Brumm	8 April 2019	233,000
Bandit takes Bluey and Bingo on a car trip to the dump to throw away rubbish. Bluey asks Bandit a range of questions on the way and he proclaims that he knows everything, but when they arrive, Bluey is saddened to learn that he is throwing away her old drawings.
35	35	"Zoo"	Jasmine Moody	Beth Harvey; Joe Brumm	9 April 2019	217,000
Bluey and Bingo set up a pretend zoo in the backyard, with Bluey acting as the zookeeper who takes Bingo and Chilli on a tour around the grounds. When Bandit, acting as a baboon, escapes from the enclosure and takes Bingo, Bluey must devise a plan to catch him.
36	36	"Backpackers"	Jasmine Moody	Joe Brumm	10 April 2019	257,000
Bluey, Bingo, Muffin and Socks roleplay a pretend backpacking adventure around the backyard. The children become the backpacks as Chilli and Bandit are tasked with carrying them around while exploring their holiday destination.
37	37	"The Adventure"	Chris Voigt	Joe Brumm	11 April 2019	243,000
Bluey plays with Chloe and pretends to be a horse as she accompanies the princess on an imaginary adventure to find food at the family farm. The friends swap roles and adopt a variety of personas as they save the kingdom from an evil queen.
38	38	"Copycat"	Chris Voigt	Joe Brumm	12 April 2019	313,000
Bandit wakes to find Bluey copying his every move. While the pair are playing outside, Bluey finds an injured budgie, and they take it to the vet and learn that it has died. When they get home, Bluey reenacts the events with Bingo to cope with the budgie's death.
39	39	"The Sleepover"	Jasmine Moody	Joe Brumm	13 April 2019	191,000
Muffin arrives at Bluey and Bingo's house for a sleepover in an extremely tired state due to her transitioning from her daily naps. The sisters stay up late and play a game with Muffin, before helping her get to sleep when they realise she is exhausted.
40	40	"Early Baby"	Suzy Brumm	Joe Brumm	14 April 2019	255,000
When Rusty and Indy's two separate games at Bluey's playgroup come into conflict, the groups explain their different activities to each other. After sharing, the friends find common ground with their games, and Rusty and Indy decide to play together.
41	41	"Mums and Dads"	Mike Chavez	Joe Brumm	15 April 2019	231,000
Rusty and Indy have a disagreement about which parent should work while playing "Mums and Dads", leading them to play separately. However, when they find that their friends have different ideas about how to play the game, the pair return to playing with each other again.
42	42	"Hide and Seek"	Chris Voigt	Joe Brumm	16 April 2019	229,000
Bluey plays hide and seek with Bingo, Chilli and Bandit, but is quickly distracted by her toys, leaving her family hiding around the house undiscovered. When she slows down and focuses, Bluey remembers the game and successfully finds her family.
43	43	"Camping"	Jasmine Moody	Joe Brumm	17 April 2019	270,000
Bluey meets a French-Canadian Labrador named Jean-Luc while on a camping trip with her family. The pair play together and build a camp site, but when Bandit acts as a wild pig, they must find a way to communicate to combat the pig.
44	44	"Mount Mumandad"	Chris Voigt	Tim Bain; Joe Brumm	18 April 2019	261,000
Bluey and Bingo pretend that Chilli and Bandit are a mountain when they are tasked with playing a game without their parents' participation. Bluey races ahead to reach the summit while Bingo brings along a backpack to carry the climbing equipment.
45	45	"Kids"	Ellie Goggin	Joe Brumm	19 April 2019	269,000
During a visit to the supermarket, Bluey adopts the role of the parent while Bandit must act as the child alongside Bingo. When he tries to fill the shopping trolley with the groceries, Bandit gets in trouble with Bluey for being a disobedient child.
46	46	"Chickenrat"	Mike Chavez	Joe Brumm	20 April 2019	242,000
Before bed, Bingo loses her favourite cuddly toy (Floppy), so Chilli and Bluey help retrace her steps to find it. The sisters recount their adventures as they remember playing with Bandit, who was pretending to be a "chickenrat" creature.
47	47	"Neighbours"	Chris Voigt	Joe Brumm	21 April 2019	195,000
Bluey builds a pretend house and gains some new neighbours when Bingo, Chilli and Bandit move into the street. Bluey must learn to get along with a difficult neighbour when Bingo invades her space and spills over onto her property.
48	48	"Teasing"	TBA	Joe Brumm	22 April 2019 (Note: This episode was first released on ABC iView on 1 April 2019.)	187,000
When Bluey teases Bingo, she argues that it is acceptable because Bandit always teases her. The family recalls all of the times that Bandit has made fun of them, but they ultimately learn that there is a difference between teasing and playing.
49	49	"Asparagus"	Chris Voigt	Joe Brumm	23 April 2019	157,000
Bandit tries to teach Bluey how to use manners while eating dinner at the dining table. However, when Chilli gives Bluey a stick of asparagus which magically turns the family into animals, Bluey discovers the importance of manners while trying to control everyone.
50	50	"Shaun"	Chris Voigt	John McGeachin; Joe Brumm	24 April 2019	172,000
Bluey and Bingo try to convince Bandit to get a pet, but he insists that they already have a pet; a disobedient emu called Shaun. Bandit's hand transforms into Shaun and the sisters learn how to look after their new pet by feeding, bathing and walking him.
51	51	"Daddy Putdown"	Suzy Brumm	Joe Brumm	25 April 2019	149,000
While Chilli is out for the night at a friend's baby shower, Bandit must put Bluey and Bingo to bed as part of their evening routine. When Bluey is missing her mother, she decides to set up a pretend baby shower of her own to take her mind off her anxiety.
52	52	"Verandah Santa"	Jasmine Moody	Joe Brumm	12 December 2019 (Note: This episode was first released on TVNZ OnDemand on 1 October 2019 and aired on Disney Junior (USA) on 30 November 2019.)	207,000
On Christmas Eve, Bluey learns that Santa only visits children who are well-behaved, but during a game of "Verandah Santa", she is bitten by Socks and becomes aggrieved. Failing to control her emotions, Bluey purposely excludes Socks from the game, before Chilli and Bandit teach her the importance of being kind-hearted throughout the whole year.

=== Series 2 (2020–2021) ===
No. overall	No. in series	Title	Storyboarded by	Written by	Original release date	Australian viewers
Part 1
53	1	"Dance Mode"	Chris Voigt	Joe Brumm	17 March 2020	458,000
When Bandit unintentionally eats Bingo's last chip at a restaurant, he makes it up to her by giving her the power of "Dance Mode"; the ability to make her family members dance at any chosen time. However, Bingo is frustrated when her family make the decisions for her and waste her chances to use the power.
54	2	"Hammerbarn"	Sarah Rackemann	Joe Brumm	18 March 2020	338,000
Bandit is inspired by Pat to build a new pizza oven, so he takes the family to visit Hammerbarn, the local hardware store, for supplies. They build pretend gardens in the shopping trolley using items collected during the journey around the warehouse. Bluey continually compares her creation to Bingo's and struggles to deal with jealousy of her sister.
55	3	"Featherwand"	Chris Voigt	Joe Brumm	19 March 2020	381,000
Bluey prepares to attend Chloe's birthday party, but Bingo feels dejected when she is reminded that she is not invited. Bingo discovers a magical "featherwand" which has the ability to deliberately make items heavy upon her command, slowing down the process of Bluey and Chilli leaving the house.
56	4	"Squash"	Jasmine Moody	Dan Brumm; Joe Brumm	20 March 2020	351,000
During their competitive game of squash, Bluey and Bingo pretend to control Bandit and Uncle Stripe’s movements. Bingo is disheartened when Bandit insists that older siblings always win, which leads her to inspire and motivate Uncle Stripe into winning the second round.
57	5	"Hairdressers"	Beth Harvey	Joe Brumm	21 March 2020	361,000
While roleplaying as hairdressers, Bingo struggles to articulate her ideas and Bluey continually speaks on her behalf. When the sisters discover that Bandit has nits, they must work together to combat the growing threat to their game. Bluey learns to stop and listen to Bingo's ideas, while Bingo finds her voice and learns how to be confident.
58	6	"Stumpfest"	Mike Chavez	Joe Brumm	22 March 2020	343,000
Bandit, Uncle Stripe, and Pat announce their intention to remove the tree stumps from the backyard; in what they call "Stumpfest". Meanwhile, Bluey, Bingo, and Muffin set up a make believe nail salon on one of the stumps, and enter a sit-in protest to stop the stump being removed by the parents, before deciding to negotiate with them.
59	7	"Favourite Thing"	Chris Voigt	Joe Brumm	23 March 2020	303,000
At the dinner table, the Heelers share their favourite things that happened throughout the day. Bluey recalls her highlight and accidentally embarrasses Bingo in the process, so the family work together to retell funny moments from the day in the hope of making Bingo feel better.
60	8	"Daddy Dropoff"	Jasmine Moody	Joe Brumm	24 March 2020 (Note: This episode was first released on ABC iView on 17 March 2020.)	192,000
When it is Bandit's turn to take Bluey and Bingo to school and kindergarten, the girls set out to make the morning a little more fun. Bandit desperately tries to adhere to the morning routine while entertaining Bluey and Bingo's gameplay along the way.
61	9	"Bingo"	Tom Ward	Joe Brumm	25 March 2020	195,000
When Bluey is away at a play date with Chloe, Bingo tries to learn how to play by herself. She initially struggles to select a suitable game to play, but is inspired by Chilli to instead find a problem that needs solving. Bingo takes on the challenge of determining the colour of a kiwi to entertain herself.
62	10	"Rug Island"	Jasmine Moody	Joe Brumm	26 March 2020	191,000
Bluey and Bingo set up the imaginative "Rug Island" in the backyard, repurposing their play mat and felt-tip pens. While adults are not typically not allowed on the island, Bandit suddenly finds himself washed up on the beach. He is tempted to stay and rediscover his inner child, as he learns about the routines and customs of the land.
63	11	"Charades"	Beth Harvey	Joe Brumm	27 March 2020	310,000
Bluey and Bingo play charades with the cousins at Nana's house, but They struggle to comprehend the rules of the game. While She tries to cater for everyone, the cousins begin to bicker and the game quickly derails. She teaches them how to sacrifice the rules of the game to ensure that their younger cousins have fun.
64	12	"Sticky Gecko"	Suzy Brumm; Beth Harvey	Joe Brumm	28 March 2020	206,000
Chilli tries to get Bluey and Bingo ready to leave for a play date, but the girls are distracted by the "sticky gecko" toy which is clinging to the ceiling. She juggles multiple tasks at once, as Bluey and Bingo reluctantly dress and ready themselves for their meeting at the park. Ultimately, Chilli and Bluey come to an understanding about the play date.
65	13	"Dad Baby"	Jasmine Moody	Joe Brumm	29 March 2020	370,000
When Bingo finds her old baby sling, Bandit demonstrates how it works. Bluey insists that he must now pretend to be pregnant while carrying Bingo around inside of it. Bandit realises how challenging it is to be pregnant, and with the help of Pat, finally gives birth to his new baby.
66	14	"Mum School"	Anna Pan	Joe Brumm	30 March 2020	277,000
Bluey attends "Mum School", a pretend training course in which she learns how to be a mother by looking after a group of balloons. Throughout the day, Bluey must learn how to manage a difficult balloon as Chilli assesses her mothering skills. Ultimately, Chilli encourages Bluey to continue refining her abilities before she can complete the course.
67	15	"Trains"	Mike Chavez	Joe Brumm	31 March 2020	312,000
Bingo roleplays a day of carrying out errands, as she travels to each location on Bandit's pretend train, but when Bluey boards the train as an unruly passenger, the journey is delayed, and Bingo's schedule is disrupted. Bingo is late for work at the vet, which sets off a chain of events that leads her to reconsider her approach to work.
68	16	"Army"	Jasmine Moody	Joe Brumm	1 April 2020	329,000
Jack has his first day at Bluey's school, but he is worried that he will struggle to sit still and follow instructions, so he befriends Rusty, who teaches him how to play "Army". As a new recruit, Jack must follow directions from his drill sergeant Rusty, as he undergoes training to become a soldier. He discovers his ability to focus and is accepted into the army as a private.
69	17	"Fancy Restaurant"	Anna Pan	Joe Brumm; Chris Bennett	2 April 2020	356,000
Bluey and Bingo want to witness their parents kiss, so they decide to teach Bandit how to be romantic. The sisters set up a pretend restaurant in the playroom, with Bluey acting as their server and Bingo becoming the chef. He tries to impress Chilli on their date, the sisters attempt to serve a special meal, with Bandit finding a unique way to be romantic.
70	18	"Piggyback"	Jim Byrt	Joe Brumm	3 April 2020	403,000
The Heelers go for a walk along the riverside, with Bluey and Bingo riding on their scooters. However, Bingo starts to tire and complains of sore legs, so Chilli, Bandit and Bluey think of inventive ways to motivate her to continue moving. Bingo makes it all the way to the riverbank and is inspired to run all the way home.
71	19	"The Show"	Jasmine Moody	Joe Brumm	4 April 2020	352,000
After Bingo accidentally drops the breakfast she and Bluey prepared for Chilli on Mother's Day, she becomes discouraged. The sisters stage a performance for their mother instead, after she teaches them that "the show must go on". However, after a minor mishap, Bingo feels as if she has ruined the entire presentation, but she returns to the show, which is ultimately a success.
72	20	"Tickle Crabs"	Tom Ward	Joe Brumm	5 April 2020	345,000
Bluey and Bingo convince their father to play one of his least favourite games, "Tickle Crabs", which requires him to pretend to be at the beach, and accidentally bring home some crabs who tickle him. Bandit begs his wife to play the game with him, but when she refuses, he realises that he must find a way to stop the tickling crabs by himself.
73	21	"Escape"	Chris Voigt	Joe Brumm	6 April 2020	420,000
Bluey and Bingo are outraged to hear that Chilli and Bandit will be spending some time alone while they are at Nana's house. The sisters form an elaborate mental image of how they could infiltrate their parents' private time, while they imagine how they might escape from the pursuit of their children, until they reversed the chase.
74	22	"Bus"	Tom Ward	Joe Brumm	7 April 2020	326,000
Bluey and Bingo dress up as grandmothers and board the imaginary bus that Bandit is driving, while befriending Chilli, acting as a lady who has a crush on him. They become matchmakers and help the lady work up the nerve to talk to the driver, wreaking havoc on the bus to allow their new friend more time to find her confidence.
75	23	"Queens"	Sarah Rackemann	Joe Brumm; Idea : Michael Griffin	8 April 2020	297,000
Bingo dresses up as a queen, while Bluey acts as her royal butler, before they switch roles, but when the sisters both want to become the royal butlers, they must appoint a new queen. She sacrifices her role as the butler for her sister, to allow her to completely enjoy the game. Later, they select Chilli to be their new queen.
76	24	"Flat Pack"	Sarah Rackemann	Joe Brumm	9 April 2020	356,000
While Chilli and Bandit struggle to assemble a flat pack garden chair, Bluey and Bingo play with the boxes and packaging in the backyard. The sisters roleplay evolution as they pretend to be different creatures navigating the new world that they have built around themselves.
77	25	"Helicopter"	Sarah Rackemann	Joe Brumm	10 April 2020	338,000
After she is forced to cancel a play date with Honey, Bluey learns that there are things in life she cannot control. At school, she flies a pretend helicopter and appoints herself as the pilot, but as her friends add their own details to her helicopter simulation, Bluey realises that she must give up some control so that others can enjoy the game too.
78	26	"Sleepytime"	Jasmine Moody	Joe Brumm	11 April 2020	376,000
At bedtime, Bingo is determined to sleep for the whole night in her own bed, and after reading a bedtime story about outer space, she is propelled into traveling through the Solar System in her dream. Along with her stuffed toy rabbit Floppy, she imagines journeying among the planets as she unconsciously switches between the beds of the house during the night.
Part 2
79	27	"Grandad"	Jasmine Moody	Joe Brumm	25 October 2020	227,000 (Note: The viewership number for this broadcast also encompassed the figure for a repeat of the episode "Charades". The broadcast was referred to as a "preview episode" in celebration of Grandparents Day.)
Chilli takes Bluey and Bingo to visit Grandad at his home near the bush, while he is recovering from heartworm. Chilli insists that he should be resting, but Grandad refutes that it should be his decision. Grandad, Bluey and Bingo adventure into the bush while Chilli chases after them. Ultimately, Grandad relents and admits that as he is getting older, he should be resting.
80	28	"Seesaw"	Chris Voigt	Joe Brumm	26 October 2020	404,000
While playing at the park, Pom Pom feels that she is too small to fully participate in Bluey and Bingo's games. However, while playing on the seesaw, the sisters are provoked by Bandit, who uses his weight to bring the equipment's movement to a standstill. Bluey and Bingo recruit a group of their friends to overthrow Bandit from the seesaw, and ultimately require Pom Pom's help.
81	29	"Movies"	Jasmine Moody	Joe Brumm	27 October 2020	383,000
Bandit takes Bluey and Bingo to the movie theatre for the first time, but Bluey is hesitant, getting worked up about the impending frightening sequence of the film. However, when Bingo's behaviour in the theatre becomes unmanageable, Bluey must conquer her fear of the movie to assist Bandit in calming her sister down.
82	30	"Library"	Sarah Rackemann	Joe Brumm	28 October 2020	343,000
Uncle Stripe tells Muffin that she is "the most special kid in the world", leading her to believe that she does not have to follow the rules. This leads to conflict when They struggle to involve her in their library roleplay without her completely disregarding their instructions.
83	31	"Barky Boats"	Jasmine Moody	Joe Brumm	29 October 2020	388,000
At school, Bluey and Mackenzie are visited by their older buddies. Bluey creates a fairy garden with Mia, while Mackenzie floats pieces of bark as boats with Captain. Mia and Captain show more interest in spending time with each other than their younger buddies and abandon Bluey and Mackenzie, which leaves them feeling disheartened.
84	32	"Burger Shop"	Tom Ward	Joe Brumm	30 October 2020	389,000
After reading a parenting book, Bandit decides to allow Bluey and Bingo to make their own choices and develop autonomy. The sisters act out the procedures of a burger restaurant while in the bathtub, and he gently encourages them to finish their game and go to bed. Ultimately, Bandit realises that a more authoritarian approach is required to make the sisters listen.
85	33	"Circus"	Jasmine Moody	Joe Brumm	31 October 2020 (Note: This episode aired on the day of the 2020 Queensland state election.)	437,000
On election day, Bluey, Bingo, and their friends perform a make-believe circus show at the park, with Bluey acting as the ringleader, while their parents cast their votes. While Hercules uses force to make Winton play with him, she demonstrates that a responsible leader shows their followers what to do in a considerate manner.
86	34	"Swim School"	Chris Voigt	Joe Brumm	1 November 2020	424,000
Bluey adopts the persona of an eccentric swimming instructor and takes on Bingo, Chilli and Bandit as her students. While in the pool, the family get tied up in the politics of rules around dobbing on one another. The parents try to teach their children that the true purposes of informing are to protect one another from danger and to support each other.
87	35	"Café"	Chris Voigt	Joe Brumm; Dave Lowe	2 November 2020	341,000
Over a consecutive few mornings at the park, Bluey makes a new friend named Winnie, and Bandit meets her father, Fido. Their friendship develops and Winnie invites Bluey over for breakfast, but Bandit and Fido take longer to affirm their own friendship. The children must convince their fathers to admit their fondness for each other and organise the gathering.
88	36	"Postman" "Postman and Ground's Lava"	Chris Voigt	Joe Brumm	3 November 2020	396,000
When Bluey overhears her parents arguing over a trivial matter, she expresses her unsettlement, so she acts as a postie with the aim of delivering an apology letter from Bandit to Chilli. However, when Bingo wants to play the floor is lava, the sisters must work together to combine their games. Bluey learns that bickering is healthy and helps people to communicate.
89	37	"The Quiet Game"	Jasmine Moody	Joe Brumm	4 November 2020	414,000
After Bluey and Bingo are playing too loudly, Bandit sneakily instructs them to remain silent for as long as they can and disguises the request as a game. However, when he visits the toy store with them to buy a birthday present for Muffin, he must rely on the girls' gestures and movements as they silently indicate which toy their cousin wants to receive.
90	38	"Mr Monkeyjocks"	Jasmine Moody	Joe Brumm	5 November 2020	397,000
Bluey asks her father for a new toy, but he says they have too many toys already and insists that the girls must decide which of their toys are special and should be kept, and which ones can be donated. When they decide their stuffed toy monkey Mr Monkeyjocks is too important to discard, Bandit challenges them to prove why he is special.
91	39	"Double Babysitter"	Sarah Rackemann	Joe Brumm	6 November 2020	314,000
Chilli and Bandit are both out for the night, and they accidentally double-book Uncle Rad and Bluey's godmother Frisky to babysit Bluey and Bingo. Bluey is uncomfortable about being put to bed by babysitters, so Uncle Rad and Frisky organise some games to help her get to know them better, and they also develop a romantic connection.
92	40	"Bad Mood"	Sarah Rackemann	Joe Brumm	7 November 2020	368,000
Chilli accidentally sends Bingo into a bad mood by calling her behaviour "cheeky", leading Bingo to run to Bandit, who acts as her "bad mood". Bingo stands on her father's feet as he stomps around the house, controlling all of her movements. Bluey tries to free Bingo from the control of her bad mood by enticing her with all of her favourite things.
93	41	"Octopus"	Sarah Rackemann	Mark Paterson; Joe Brumm	8 November 2020	392,000
Chloe is exhilarated while playing "Octopus" at Bluey's house, and tries to replicate the experience at home with her father, but becomes disheartened when her father struggles to play the game with the same zest as Bluey's father. This leads Chloe's father to research the octopus, which helps the duo to improvise and reinvent the activity in their own way.
94	42	"Bin Night"	Chris Voigt	Joe Brumm	9 November 2020	374,000
Bluey and Bingo help Bandit take out the bins at night for rubbish collection, and watch with Chilli as the rubbish truck arrives the next morning. Over a consecutive few weeks, Bingo recounts how a new student at kindergarten has been calling her names. After initially being tolerant, Bingo eventually finds a way to become friends with her new classmate.
95	43	"Muffin Cone"	Chris Voigt	Joe Brumm	10 November 2020	382,000
Muffin refuses to stop sucking her thumb, so Aunt Trixie puts her in a dog cone to help break the habit. Muffin is angered, while Bluey and Bingo are frustrated that their cousin cannot play with them due to her restricted movement. The sisters think of games that Muffin will still be able to join in with while wearing her "cone of shame".
96	44	"Duck Cake"	Sarah Rackemann	Joe Brumm	11 November 2020	416,000
Bandit sets out to prepare a famous duck-shaped cake for Bingo's birthday, which proves to be more difficult than he anticipated. Concurrently, he implores Bluey to clean up her toys, but she struggles to find the motivation to do so. When she sees her father become dispirited while baking, Bluey begins to understand the value of assisting others.
97	45	"Handstand"	Chris Voigt	Joe Brumm	12 November 2020	331,000
At her birthday party, Bingo attempts to perform a handstand, but feels overlooked when no one seems to notice her. Nana also feels out of place when she realises that no one has a job for her or requires her assistance. Ultimately, Bingo and Nana find each other and Nana watches Bingo as she accomplishes her handstand.
98	46	"Road Trip"	Sarah Rackemann	Joe Brumm; Francis Stanton	13 November 2020 (Note: This episode was first released on ABC iView on 26 October 2020.)	214,000
The Heelers embark on a road trip in the family four-wheel drive, and Bandit tries to stay ahead of the "grey nomads" to avoid losing the ideal camping location. Bluey becomes bored with the long journey, and Chilli tries to entertain her with some car games, but she ultimately learns to appreciate life's smaller details to persevere through boredom.
99	47	"Ice Cream"	Jasmine Moody	Joe Brumm	14 November 2020	218,000
Bluey and Bingo convince Bandit to buy them desserts from an ice cream cart, and he reluctantly obliges. However, the sisters get caught up in an argument about how to share their chosen flavours equally, which results in both of their ice creams melting. After wasting their treats, they decide on a more sensible way to share.
100	48	"Dunny"	Ellie Goggin	Joe Brumm	15 November 2020	204,000
Chilli asks Bluey and Bingo not to use the word "dunny" when referring to the toilet, as she believes it sounds impolite. The sisters try to comprehend their mother's reasoning for making the request, and cheekily try and find ways to keep using the slang term.
101	49	"Typewriter"	Sarah Rackemann	Joe Brumm	16 November 2020	226,000
Calypso tells her students a story and Bluey is unimpressed with the tale's resolution. She is inspired to rewrite the story herself on an old typewriter, but when it goes missing, she must journey through the gardens along with Snickers and Winton, to ask Calypso to help solve their problems. Along the way, the trio are ambushed by the Terriers.
102	50	"Baby Race"	Ellie Goggin	Joe Brumm	17 November 2020	459,000
Chilli recounts how when Bluey and Judo were both babies, she was eager to watch Bluey progress in important milestones such as sitting, crawling, and walking before Judo did. Chilli had become disheartened when Judo seemed to be winning the "baby race", but eventually realised that she needed to foster Bluey's development at their own pace.
103	51	"Christmas Swim"	Jasmine Moody	Joe Brumm	1 December 2020	414,000
The Heelers spend Christmas Day with the extended family, and Bluey receives a new stuffed toy dog, Bartlebee, as a gift. Bluey introduces the toy to her relatives, but is concerned when they all play too rough with him. After a video call with Frisky, Bluey is convinced to let everyone have another chance at adjusting to the new family member.
104	52	"Easter"	Chris Voigt	Joe Brumm	4 April 2021	607,000
Bluey and Bingo are anxious about Easter when they remember that the Easter Bunny forgot to bring them Easter eggs last year. Bingo is worried that she is a forgettable child, but Bluey tries to convince her otherwise. On the morning of Easter, the sisters wake up to find a series of clues which lead them on a treasure hunt around the house to discover their eggs.

=== Series 3 (2021–2024) ===
No. overall	No. in series	Title	Storyboarded by	Written by	Original release date	Australian viewers
Part 1
105	1	"Perfect"	Tim Delaney	Joe Brumm	5 September 2021	459,000
For her Father's Day card, Bluey sets out to draw a picture of herself and her father together. While recalling her favourite memories of playing with Bandit, Bluey struggles with the idea that her drawing must be perfect. Chilli tries to convince Bluey that perfection is not easy, or absolutely necessary.
106	2	"Bedroom"	Sarah Rackemann	Joe Brumm	22 November 2021	364,000
Chilli and Bandit turn the old nursery into a new bedroom for Bluey. In the process, Bluey and Bingo politely divide their belongings, but get absorbed by trading items and swapping notes at bedtime. Ultimately, when Bluey misses her sister, she asks to return to her old room.
107	3	"Obstacle Course"	Chris Voigt	Joe Brumm	23 November 2021	287,000
Chilli sets up an obstacle course in the backyard, but Bluey is disheartened when Bandit turns it into a race and beats her. After cheating in a rematch, Bluey discovers the importance of training in order to improve her skills.
108	4	"Promises"	Chris Voigt	Joe Brumm	24 November 2021	352,000
Bluey makes a promise that she does not keep, but gets upset when Bandit breaks one of his promises. Chilli teaches the pair that the purpose of making a promise is to build trust, and Bluey discovers the importance of upholding her agreements.
109	5	"Omelette"	Chris Voigt	Joe Brumm	25 November 2021	298,000
Chilli decides to cook Bandit an omelette for his birthday and Bingo offers her assistance. Chilli tries to make the breakfast quickly, but finds that Bingo's interference is causing delays, until she ultimately decides to relinquish control and allow Bingo to help.
110	6	"Born Yesterday"	Sarah Rackemann	Joe Brumm	26 November 2021	349,000
Bandit teaches Bluey and Bingo the idiom "born yesterday" by pretending he is newly born into the world. The sisters help him navigate his new surroundings while explaining unspoken social rules. This leads to Bandit seeing the world from a new perspective.
111	7	"Mini Bluey"	Sarah Rackemann	Joe Brumm	27 November 2021	452,000
Bandit notices the many differences between Bluey and Bingo, which inspires them to turn Bingo into a "Mini Bluey" who adopts her sister's mannerisms. Bluey then decides to change into a "Big Bingo", but is upset when she feels as if Bandit prefers Bingo's personality to her own.
112	8	"Unicorse"	Jasmine Moody	Joe Brumm	28 November 2021	402,000
Bluey cannot get to sleep, so Chilli reads her a bedtime story, while Bandit interjects through the use of a crass unicorn hand puppet named Unicorse. Bluey and Chilli are annoyed by the interruptions and try to improve the puppet's behaviour.
113	9	"Curry Quest"	Jasmine Moody	Joe Brumm	29 November 2021	323,000
Bandit and Bingo embark on a quest to exchange a dish of curry with Mackenzie's father. They travel through the park and withstand a swooping magpie, before Bingo learns an upsetting secret about Bandit at Mackenzie's house. Bingo must learn to cope with the news in order to complete the quest.
114	10	"Magic"	Tim Delaney	Joe Brumm	30 November 2021	354,000
When Chilli does not feel like playing, Bluey teaches Bingo how to use magic so that they can control and force her to play with them, but Bluey neglects to enforce the golden rule: that magic should be used to help others, rather than for mischief.
115	11	"Chest"	Claire Renton	Joe Brumm	1 December 2021	343,000
Bandit decides that Bluey is old enough to learn how to play chess, with Bingo on her team. However, Bluey and Bingo are too distracted by the elaborate chess pieces to take notice of the game's intricacies. Chilli takes over the game and encourages Bandit to focus on raising the girls to be good-hearted rather than intelligent.
116	12	"Sheepdog"	Tim Delaney	Joe Brumm	2 December 2021	281,000
Chilli requests some alone time from Bluey and Bingo, so Bandit allows them to play "Sheepdog", one of his least favourite games, in order to keep them away from their mother. Bluey is upset, but Chilli tries to explain why parents sometimes need a break. Judo's mother Wendy helps Bandit to fulfil the request.
117	13	"Housework"	Tim Delaney	Joe Brumm	3 December 2021	302,000
While Bluey and Bingo tidy up their blanket fort, Chilli and Bandit observe the many and varied silly ways of walking that the sisters use while cleaning. The parents are inspired to utilise the unusual movement strategies to make their housework more enjoyable.
118	14	"Pass the Parcel"	Jasmine Moody	Joe Brumm	4 December 2021	369,000
At a birthday party, Pat is dismayed to learn that games of pass the parcel now contain small prizes within each layer of the wrapping paper. He customises the game to only have one major prize in the middle of the parcel, which upsets Bingo and her friends. The partygoers begin to prefer the new rules, and Bingo develops the resilience to be at peace with losing games.
119	15	"Explorers"	Sarah Rackemann	Joe Brumm	5 December 2021	305,000
At school, Jack's friends depart during the middle of their roleplaying as explorers, in which they nominate him as the captain of their pretend ship. Jack must become a fearless leader in order to navigate his way back to Australia. Meanwhile, Jack's father gets lost on the drive to school to collect his son after his satellite navigation device runs out of battery.
120	16	"Phones"	Chris Voigt	Joe Brumm	6 December 2021	338,000
Grandad visits the Heelers and is astounded by their usage of mobile phones and the internet. Bluey and Bingo invite him to roleplay at their pretend restaurant, which operates as an online food delivery service. Grandad tries to adjust to the new technology and new ways of life.
121	17	"Pavlova"	Sarah Rackemann	Joe Brumm	7 December 2021	357,000
Bluey and Bingo design a simulation of a café with the specific intention of eating pavlova, which Chilli has denied them from eating. Bandit acts as a French chef to prevent their plan from working, and the parents try to convince Bingo to try eating edamame beans.
122	18	"Rain"	Jasmine Moody	Joe Brumm	8 December 2021	258,000
A summer rainstorm approaches the neighbourhood, causing the Heelers' front yard to be flooded with rain. Noticing a stream of water trickling down the footpath, Bluey tries a variety of methods to barricade the flow. Chilli is annoyed when Bluey leaves muddy footprints throughout the house.
123	19	"Pizza Girls"	Tim Delaney	Joe Brumm	9 December 2021	319,000
Bluey and Bingo roleplay a pizza delivery service using their pedal car, which is becoming run-down, and make pretend pizzas using mud to deliver to the adults. When Muffin showcases her new electric car, the group utilise the new model for their game, but Bluey realises that she prefers her old car.
124	20	"Driving"	Tim Delaney	Joe Brumm	10 December 2021	284,000
Chilli is overwhelmed by tasks at the start of a busy day, but finds five minutes to play a game of "Driving" with Bluey, who sits on her lap as she pretends to be a car, in which they go for a drive. Bluey finds a way to help Chilli give the game a purpose and fully commit to the roleplay.
125	21	"Tina"	Jasmine Moody	Joe Brumm	11 December 2021	401,000
Bluey and Bingo introduce their imaginary friend Tina to their parents when they are tired of being told what to do. The sisters use Tina's large size to their advantage so that Bandit and Chilli will do whatever they demand, until the parents plan a way to regain power.
126	22	"Whale Watching"	Sarah Rackemann	Joe Brumm	12 December 2021	312,000
While their parents are lying down exhausted, Bluey and Bingo pretend that Bandit is a boat which they board for a whale watching expedition. After encountering rough seas, Chilli adopts the role of a whale and is spotted by the girls, but the expedition does not immediately live up to their expectations.
127	23	"Family Meeting"	Tim Delaney	Joe Brumm	13 December 2021	334,000
Bandit is accused of passing wind in Bluey's face and Chilli decides to settle the matter by putting Bandit on trial at a family meeting. Chilli acts as a judge and listens to both sides of the story, before Bluey and Bingo are called to the stand as witnesses. Bandit uncovers a hidden truth about Bluey's actions.
128	24	"Faceytalk"	Sarah Rackemann	Joe Brumm	14 December 2021	414,000
Bluey and Bingo video call Muffin and Socks through "Faceytalk" on their tablet computer. When Muffin dominates the drawing function of the call while Socks patiently waits for a turn, Uncle Stripe and Aunt Trixie argue over the best way to discipline Muffin.
129	25	"Ragdoll"	Sarah Rackemann	Joe Brumm	15 December 2021	330,000
Bandit tries to teach Bluey and Bingo the value of hard work when they want to buy an ice cream with his money. He pretends to be a lifeless rag doll that they must manoeuvre out of the house in order to get to the corner shop. Later, Wendy assists the girls in outsmarting Bandit.
130	26	"Fairytale"	Jasmine Moody	Joe Brumm	16 December 2021	317,000
Bandit tells Bluey and Bingo a real-life fairytale about his childhood in the 1980s, recalling a holiday with his brothers, when he would often tease Stripe, until he is cursed with a jinx. He fixes his relationship with Stripe and finds a way to break the curse with the help of a princess.
Part 2
131	27	"Musical Statues"	Jasmine Moody	Joe Brumm	13 June 2022	489,000
When Bluey is in a bad mood, Bingo wants to play, and Bandit is eager to leave the house, Chilli demands a game of musical statues to bring the family together. After the first game concludes, the Heelers invent a new way of playing which allows them to continue their dancing and keep having fun.
132	28	"Stories"	Jasmine Moody	Joe Brumm	14 June 2022	464,000
Calypso tells a story about Indy making a craft beeswax horse at school, which ends with her giving up and believing that she is not good at anything. Indy asks for the story to be retold, where this time, Winton helps her to successfully complete her craft and both feel proud of it.
133	29	"Puppets"	Jasmine Moody	Joe Brumm	15 June 2022	418,000
Bandit facilitates Unicorse to teach Bluey how to use good manners at dinnertime. Unicorse develops feelings for Chilli, in which Bluey and Bingo help him clean himself up to win her affections. Later, Unicorse is shocked to discover that he is actually a puppet.
134	30	"Turtleboy"	Chris Voigt	Joe Brumm	16 June 2022	415,000
At the park, Bingo discovers a lost turtle toy named Turtleboy and plays with him. Bandit insists that they should not take it home as its rightful owner might return to collect it. After she leaves, a hearing impaired puppy named Dougie also plays with the turtle. Both Bingo and Dougie hide Turtleboy on separate occasions in the hope that he will not be taken from the park.
135	31	"Onesies"	Suzy Brumm	Joe Brumm	17 June 2022	378,000
Chilli's sister Brandy visits the Heelers after being apart for four years, and gifts Bluey and Bingo with animal onesies. When Bingo's cheetah onesie leads her to act like a wild cheetah and terrorise everyone, Brandy tries to cope with the emotions that visiting the family brings up.
136	32	"Tradies"	Chris Voigt	Joe Brumm	18 June 2022	289,000
Bluey and Bingo hide under the back decking of the house to spy on two tradies while they install a fishpond in the backyard. The sisters and Chilli become invested in the lives of the tradies and form a bond with them over the three days they are working.
137	33	"Granny Mobile"	Sarah Rackemann	Joe Brumm	19 June 2022	286,000
Bluey, Bingo, and Muffin attend Doreen's garage sale, where they notice her mobility scooter is being sold, so they dress up as grandmothers and roleplay the sale of the run-down vehicle. Muffin's "grouchy granny" persona helps Doreen learn to stand up for herself.
138	34	"Space"	Chris Voigt	Joe Brumm	20 June 2022	320,000
Jack, Rusty, and Mackenzie pretend they are travelling into space in a rocketship, on a mission to Mars. Mackenzie willingly unhooks his imaginary tether and decides to journey into a black hole, attempting to recreate a memory in which he experienced abandonment.
139	35	"Smoochy Kiss"	Tim Delaney	Joe Brumm	21 June 2022	349,000
When Chilli complains about some of Bandit's annoying habits, Bluey and Bingo take him away and claim him as their own. Chilli chases him, desiring a "smoochy kiss", and the girls learn about some of Bandit's disgusting traits in the process. The parents explain that regardless of their flaws, they love each other anyway.
140	36	"Dirt"	Tim Delaney	Francis Stanton; Joe Brumm	22 June 2022	398,000
Bluey and Bingo play in a mound of dirt that has been dropped off at their house, and Judo is eager to join in, but has been instructed by her mother not to get dirty. The sisters help Judo find a way to play without getting dirty, before Wendy changes her mind and lets Judo join in.
141	37	"The Decider"	Jasmine Moody	Joe Brumm	23 June 2022 (Note: This episode aired during the 2022 State of Origin series.)	437,000
Lucky, Chucky, and Pat come over to the Heeler house to watch the big rugby league game with Bluey, Bingo, and Bandit, while Janelle watches at home. Bluey helps Chucky to decide which team to support, as his father follows the Maroons and his mother follows the Blues.
Part 3
142	38	"Cubby"	Tim Delaney	Claire Renton; Joe Brumm	9 April 2023	445,000
Bluey and Bingo need a space for their stuffed toy Kimjim to sleep, so they build a miniature bedroom for him. They expand their construction into a larger cubby, growing with multiple new rooms built from furniture around the house. The sisters lose Kimjim in the process, and Bandit tries to navigate through the massive and unfamiliar new structure.
143	39	"Exercise"	Tim Delaney	Joe Brumm	16 April 2023	528,000
Bandit decides to exercise before work, and Bluey and Bingo entangle themselves in his workout while roleplaying a day working at an office job. Bluey convinces Bingo to abandon work, which leads Bingo to question if she is being a good employee.
144	40	"Relax"	Sarah Rackemann	Joe Brumm	23 April 2023	509,000
The Heelers arrive at a hotel by the beach for a holiday. Chilli eagerly tries to take Bluey and Bingo to the beach so that she can relax, but the girls are more excited to explore their hotel room. Chilli heads to the beach alone, but has trouble relaxing.
145	41	"Stickbird"	Mike Chavez	Joe Brumm	30 April 2023	510,000
At the beach, Chilli teaches Bluey and Bingo to throw using sticks. While searching for more sticks, Bingo builds a sculpture of a bird using sticks and sand. Bluey teaches Bingo how to relinquish her anger and sadness after her stickbird is destroyed by some passers-by.
146	42	"Show and Tell"	Tim Delaney	Joe Brumm	7 May 2023	458,000
Bingo is encouraged to practise her show and tell presentation for the following day. Meanwhile, Bluey questions why Bandit bosses her and Bingo around with constant instructions, so Bandit shows the girls the consequences of not following directions.
147	43	"Dragon"	Sarah Rackemann	Joe Brumm	14 May 2023 (Note: This episode aired on Mother's Day.)	562,000
Bluey tells a fantasy story about a dragon using her drawings on paper, and Bandit, Chilli, and Bingo join in the storytelling. Bluey starts to feel self-conscious about her drawing ability, which triggers memories for Bandit and Chilli about their own childhoods.
148	44	"Wild Girls"	Sarah Rackemann	Joe Brumm	21 May 2023	492,000
Coco, Indy, and Chloe play a game called Wild Girls, but Chloe grows bored of the game because it does not ever change, and joins in a different game instead. Indy is torn when she wants to join in with Chloe but does not want to upset Coco. Calypso helps Coco to realise that games can change, and she should enjoy playing with her friends regardless of the game.
149	45	"TV Shop"	Jasmine Moody	Joe Brumm	28 May 2023	534,000
On a trip to the chemist, Bluey and Bingo are enamoured by television security monitors, and try to capture the attention of their friends who are also in the store. They use the CCTV to navigate the maze of aisles and find Coco, who is sick.
150	46	"Slide"	Tim Delaney	Joe Brumm	4 June 2023	529,000
Bingo and Lila test out a new inflatable water slide in the backyard, but Bingo becomes preoccupied with avoiding accidentally squishing the myriad of insects they encounter, and helping them cross the track safely. Bingo and Lila work together to find a solution to their problem.
151	47	"Cricket"	Sarah Rackemann	Joe Brumm	11 June 2023 (Note: This episode aired during the 2023 ICC World Test Championship final.)	563,000
Bandit recalls the story of a neighbourhood game of cricket with Bluey's friends and their parents, where he describes how Rusty gained the skills to become a successful batter, and tells how the parents struggled to bowl him out during the game.
Part 4
152	48	"Ghostbasket"	Sarah Rackemann	Joe Brumm	7 April 2024	N/A (Note: Due to changes in OzTAM ratings, programmes under a ten minute duration are no longer reported.)
Bandit pretends to be a real estate agent who is trying to sell the house, and faces opposition from Bluey and Bingo, pretending to be grandmothers who live there and refuse to move out. The pair craft a story about a haunted "ghostbasket" to prevent the house from being sold within their roleplay, while a sign for the real sale of the house sits at the front yard.
153	49	"The Sign"	Tim Delaney; Jasmine Moody; Sarah Rackemann	Joe Brumm	14 April 2024	2,288,000
Bluey struggles to adjust to the impending sale of their house and moving to another city due to Bandit's new job. While Uncle Rad and Frisky's wedding is being prepared in the Heelers’ backyard, Frisky overhears Rad's plans to move away and flees, so Chilli drives Bluey, Bingo, Muffin, and Socks to find her and return her to the house in time for the wedding. Shortly after the house is sold with the furniture removed, the sale gets cancelled and the Heelers return home.: This episode has an extended running time of 28 minutes.
154	50	"Surprise!"	Tim Delaney	Joe Brumm; Idea : Stuart Heritage	21 April 2024	N/A
Bluey asks Bandit to play her surprise-themed game, while Bingo asks him to join in her parenthood roleplay. Bandit becomes overwhelmed trying to play the two games and watch sport on the television at the same time. The episode ends with a flash-forward to the future, where an adult Bluey visits her parents' house along with her child.

== Shorts ==
=== Shorts overview ===
Series	Episodes		Originally released	
Series	Episodes		First released	Last released
Bonus Bits	21	2	17 December 2019	21 December 2019
Bonus Bits	21	15	10 December 2020	24 September 2021
Bonus Bits	21	3	1 April 2022	23 November 2022
Bonus Bits	21	1	23 December 2024	
Minisodes	21	7	16 June 2024	
Minisodes	21	7	7 October 2024	
Minisodes	21	6	8 December 2024	
Minisodes	21	1	21 December 2025	

=== Bonus Bits (2019–2024) ===
Bonus Bits are short-form Bluey content that was originally released on the series' YouTube or social media pages in Australia. "Archeology" was released worldwide on YouTube in March 2025, while "Humpty Dumpty", "Green Bottles", "Flying Saucer", "Tea Party", "Pea Pod Sausages", "Old MacDonald", "Honk", "Lollipop Song", "Cinderella", and "Make Mum Laugh" were released as Minisodes on Disney+ on 20 May 2026.

No.	Title	Original release date	Worldwide release (Note: "Archeology" was released on YouTube, while the Bonus Bits released in May 2026 were done so as Minisodes on Disney+.)
1	"Silent Night (Before Christmas)"	17 December 2019	N/A
Bandit hums the tune of "Silent Night" in an attempt to make Bingo fall asleep.
2	"Crazy Christmas Lights"	21 December 2019	N/A
Bingo plays with the light settings of the Christmas tree.
3	"Jingle Bells"	10 December 2020	N/A
Bluey and Bingo sneakily go to their Christmas tree at night and shake their presents, before singing "Jingle Bells".
4	"Lollipop Song"	11 January 2021	20 May 2026
Bluey and Bingo dance to the "Lollipop Song" in the hallway.
5	"Tea Party"	5 March 2021	20 May 2026
Bluey and Honey host a tea party for Honey's parents.
6	"Humpty Dumpty"	12 March 2021	20 May 2026
Chilli records Muffin attempting to sing a song for granddad.
7	"Flying Saucer"	17 March 2021	20 May 2026
Bluey and Bingo sing the Flying Saucer nursery rhyme while riding in the car.
8	"Tongue Twisters"	24 March 2021 (Note: This short was pulled from the official YouTube channel shortly after its release.)	N/A
Bluey reads from a book of tongue twisters.
9	"Pea Pod Sausages"	25 March 2021	20 May 2026
Bingo sings "Five Fat Peas" and "Five Fat Sausages" while drawing at the dining table.
10	"Cinderella"	8 April 2021	20 May 2026
Bandit reads Bluey and Bingo the story of Cinderella but in a funny way.
11	"Green Bottles"	21 April 2021	20 May 2026
Bingo sings a song about 10 green bottles falling off the wall.
12	"Old MacDonald"	20 May 2021	20 May 2026
The family plays a game of "Old MacDonald," where Chilli names an animal and the rest of the family imitates it.
13	"Make Mum Laugh"	1 June 2021	20 May 2026
Bluey and Bingo are given the challenge to try to make Chilli laugh.
14	"Mower"	10 June 2021	N/A
Bandit struggles to make his lawnmower work.
15	"Honk"	18 June 2021	20 May 2026
Socks asks Stripe to play "Honk", in which his nose honks whenever it is pressed.
16	"Highball"	2 July 2021	N/A
Lucky's dad tries to teach Bluey and Lucky how to kick a highball.
17	"K9 News"	24 September 2021	N/A
Snickers pretends to be a news reporter at the school playground.
18	"Archaeology"	1 April 2022	8 March 2025
Bandit presents a fossilized bone from his archaeological research.
19	"One Man Went to Mow"	31 May 2022	N/A
Bingo sings "One Man Went To Mow" on the toilet.
20	"Balloon"	23 November 2022	N/A
Bluey pretends to be a flying balloon with the help of Bandit.
21	"The Christmas Xylophone"	23 December 2024	N/A
Bluey plays "Jingle Bells" on the xylophone.

=== Minisodes (2024–2025) ===
Twenty-one shorts under the title of "Minisodes" were produced, which range from one-to-three minutes in length. The shorts were released in three parts; the first seven shorts were released in Australia in June 2024 and internationally in July, the next seven shorts were released in October 2024, and the final six shorts were released in December 2024. A Christmas-themed short was released on December 21, 2025.

No.	Title	Written by	Original release date
Part 1
1	"Burger Dog"	Joe Brumm	16 June 2024
Bluey and Bingo ask Bandit to play a song called "Burger Dog" for them, which he finds annoying, so he pretends his phone has run out of battery to avoid hearing it.
2	"Bingo 3000"	Joe Brumm	16 June 2024
Bingo acts as a robot called the "Bingo 3000", but when Bandit discovers she has malfunctioning legs, he calls technical support on the phone to try and solve the issue.
3	"Muffin Unboxing"	Joe Brumm	– (Note: This episode was first released on Disney+ on 3 July 2024.)
Stripe films Muffin unboxing a dump truck toy.
4	"Letter"	Joe Brumm	16 June 2024
At Nana's house, Bluey and Bingo listen to her read an old letter Bandit wrote when he was in primary school. Nana reads as Bandit lists his favourite things, some of which are spelled incorrectly.
5	"Hungry"	Joe Brumm	16 June 2024
When Bandit is hungry, he pretends to eat Bluey.
6	"Three Pigs"	Joe Brumm	–
Bandit tells Bluey and Bingo a humorous version of "The Three Little Pigs" as a bedtime story.
7	"Animals"	Joe Brumm	16 June 2024
At the park, Chilli tells Bingo a story about animals while pretending that Bingo's back is an open field and reenacts the animals' movements using her hands.
Part 2 (Note: These shorts were first released on ABC iView on 4 October 2024.)
8	"Tattoo Shop"	Joe Brumm	7 October 2024
Bluey and Bingo run a pretend tattoo shop, and draw a tattoo of a unicorn on Bandit's back.
9	"Phoney"	Joe Brumm	7 October 2024
Chilli uses the virtual assistant on her phone to play relaxing music, before Unicorse interrupts and requests heavy metal music.
10	"Blocks"	Joe Brumm	7 October 2024
Bluey and Bingo build a city using building blocks at Nana's house and ask her not to dismantle it. Throughout the week, Nana and Bob try to avoid the structure, but must rebuild it when Bob accidentally knocks it down.
11	"Government"	Joe Brumm	7 October 2024
Bandit pretends to write a letter to the government, with Bingo acting as the letter.
12	"Drums"	Joe Brumm	7 October 2024
At a music store, Bingo tries playing an electric drum kit.
13	"Browny Bear"	Joe Brumm	7 October 2024
After Bandit claims he is not tapping the shoulders of his family members, they task the Browny Bear puppet with the role of detective to determine who the culprit is.
14	"Whirlpool"	Joe Brumm	7 October 2024
Bluey, Bingo, and Chucky create a whirlpool while swimming in an inflatable pool.
Part 3
15	"Strong Potion"	Joe Brumm	8 December 2024
Bluey runs a pretend potion shop, and Bingo purchases a potion which makes her stronger.
16	"Robo Bingo"	Joe Brumm	8 December 2024
Bingo pretends to be a robot, while Chilli gives specific instructions to help the robot brush her teeth.
17	"Butlers"	Joe Brumm	8 December 2024
Inside of the imaginary world of Bluey and Bingo's dream mansion, a dog named Barnsley arrives to interview for the position of a new butler.
18	"Where's Bingo?"	Joe Brumm	8 December 2024
Bingo climbs onto Bandit's back, and Bandit pretends he cannot find her while searching around the house.
19	"Goldilocks"	Joe Brumm	8 December 2024
Bandit tells Bluey and Bingo a retelling of Goldilocks for their bedtime story.
20	"Alongside"	Joe Brumm	8 December 2024
In a split screen, Bluey and Honey complete a day of activities, with their locations interconnecting at one point of the day.
Part 4
21	"Christmas Cricket"	Joe Brumm	21 December 2025
Bluey, Bingo, and Lucky are playing a game of backyard cricket when they hear Pat playing "Jingle Bells" on the piano.

== Ratings ==
Audience numbers are shown in the tables above.

Bluey : Australian viewers per episode (millions)
Source: see citations above
