= Cavapoo =

Dog crossbreed

- A Cavapoo
- Other names: Cavoodle
- Common nicknames: Cavapoodle
- Origin: Australia
- Foundation stock: Cavalier King Charles Spaniel, Poodle
- Breed status: Not recognized as a breed by any major kennel club.
Traits
- Height: 23–33 cm (9.1–13.0 in)
- Weight: 4–10 kg (8.8–22.0 lb)
- Coat: Silky or curled double coat
- Color: Apricot, red, cream, black, chocolate/brown, white
- Litter size: 4–6 puppies

The Cavapoo (American English, British English) or Cavoodle (Australian English) is a crossbreed of a Cavalier King Charles Spaniel and a Poodle.

== History ==
The Cavapoo was one of many Poodle crossbreeds to emerge during the "designer dog" craze of the late 20th century. This particular hybrid originated in Australia, and gained greater attention there after several notable Australians adopted Cavapoos, including then-Prime Minister Julia Gillard and television personality Tiffany Scanlon. Breeders hoped to combine the intelligence and hypoallergenic coat of the Poodle with the friendly disposition and small size of the Cavalier King Charles Spaniel.

== Appearance and temperament ==
Like other Poodle hybrids, Cavapoos are not recognized as a breed by the American Kennel Club, or other similar organizations, and thus there is no established breed standard for them. Poodles may come in a variety of sizes and colors, and the Cavalier King Charles Spaniel does not share the Poodle's hypoallergenic characteristics, so individual Cavapoos may demonstrate considerable variation across these traits. While often marketed as hypoallergenic, no dog is completely hypoallergenic.

An adult cavapoo

== Health concerns ==
Cavapoos are generally healthy dogs, though they may be more prone to suffering some of the same health issues common to their parent breeds. This includes bloat (Poodle) and mitral valve heart disease (Cavalier King Charles Spaniel), as well as hip dysplasia and certain eye conditions (both).

A 2025 study on the epidemiology of acute diarrhea in dogs under primary veterinary care included statistics on the types/breeds most likely to suffer diarrhea and placed Cavapoos atop the list as the most likely to suffer from this health problem. The Royal Veterinary College at the University of London has also reported that Cavapoos, like other Poodle hybrids, are more prone to tick infestation because of their "curly poodle-type coats."
