= Pass the parcel =

British party game

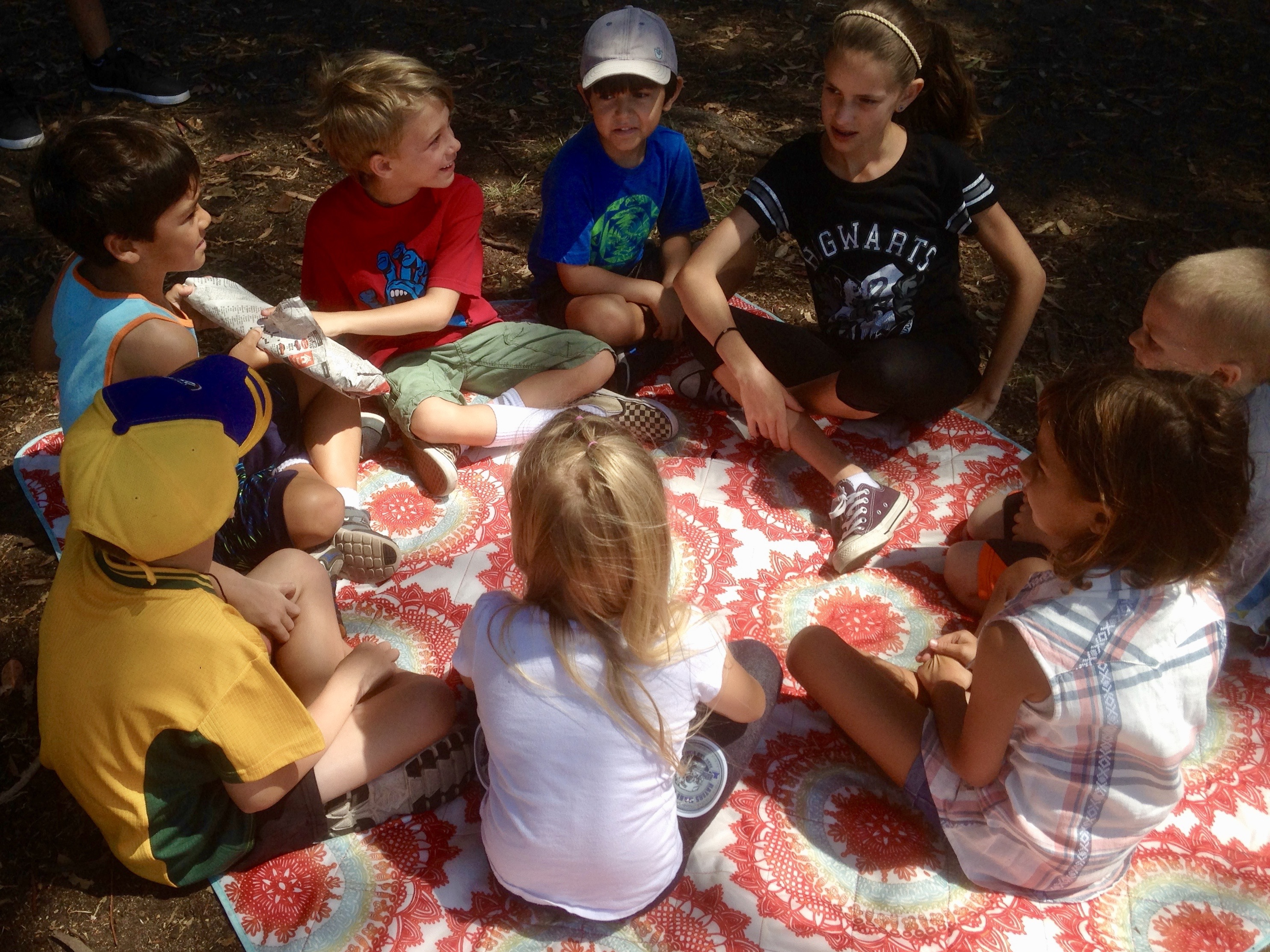
Children playing pass the parcel

Pass the parcel, also known as “pass the present” in North America, is a classic British party game in which a parcel is passed from one person to another.

In preparation for the game, a prize (or "gift") is wrapped in a large number of layers of wrapping paper or reusable fabric bags of different sizes. Usually, each layer is of a different design so they can be easily distinguished. Smaller prizes or mottos may be placed between some or all other layers of wrapping.

During the game, music is played as the parcel is passed around. Whoever is holding the parcel when the music is stopped removes one layer of wrapping and claims any prize found under that layer. Sometimes there is a prize in each layer, but some people would prefer to have only one prize in the final layer. The music is then restarted and the game continues until every layer is removed and the main prize claimed.

The stopping and starting of the music is usually done by an adult who is not taking part in the game. While they should not observe the game in order for it to be fair, in practice they often do to ensure that every participant has a turn, that prizes are well distributed and perhaps that the child whose party it is claims the main prize (or to ensure that a guest claims the prize). A fairer alternative is to prepare recordings of short snatches of music.

Variations on the game include allowing participants to remove as many layers of paper as possible (rather than just one) before the music restarts, and including challenges or forfeits on slips of paper in place of mottos.

== See also ==
- Bagholder
- Musical chairs
- Hot potato
- Passing the buck
