= List of Bluey books =

Bluey is an Australian animated television series for preschool children that premiered on ABC Kids on 1 October 2018. In April 2019, BBC Studios entered a partnership with Penguin Random House Australia with a deal to publish three Bluey books before the end of 2019. "The Beach", "Fruit Bat", and a sticker activity book entitled "Time to Play", were released on 5 November 2019. All three books were recognised as the highest-selling releases in the weekly Australian book charts of November 2019, and had sold a combined total of 350,000 copies by January 2020. "The Beach" was the highest-selling title of 2019 and sold 129,516 copies in the two months after its release. Additional books; "Bob Bilby" and "Easter Fun!", a craft book, were released on 3 March 2020, followed by a colouring book entitled "Big Backyard" on 31 March, and "The Creek" on 28 April. The combined sales of the first nine books reached 1 million in June 2020; the combined sales of 44 books reached 5 million in October 2022. In September 2020, the partnership with Penguin Random House was expanded to include global distribution rights, allowing the books to be released in the United States and the United Kingdom. As of March 2024, 76 titles have been released or are scheduled to be released in Australia.

== Releases ==
=== Episodic board books ===
#	Title	Theme	Special features	Publication date	Pages	ISBN	Reference	Sales	Awards
1	Fruit Bat		Glow-in-the-dark	5 November 2019	24	ISBN 978-1-760-89404-7		(Note: The first three titles released in November 2019 (Fruit Bat, The Beach and Time to Play!) were the second, third and fourth-highest selling Australian children's books of 2019.) (Note: The combined sales of all books reached 5 million in October 2022. While 42 books had been released at this point, the press release states that this includes 44 titles. However, two titles were scheduled for release in the following month.)	
2	The Beach		Lift-the-flap	5 November 2019	24	ISBN 978-1-760-89405-4		200,000	Winner of 2020 ABIA Book of the Year; Winner of 2020 ABIA Children's Picture Book of the Year (Ages 0–6)
3	Bob Bilby			3 March 2020	24	ISBN 978-1-760-89663-8			
4	The Creek			28 April 2020	24	ISBN 978-1-760-89661-4			Nominated for 2021 ABIA Children's Picture Book of the Year (Ages 0–6)
5	Grannies		Lenticular printed picture	1 September 2020	24	ISBN 978-1-760-89936-3			
6	The Pool			5 January 2021	24	ISBN 978-1-761-04084-9			
7	Bingo		Jigsaw puzzle	30 March 2021	24	ISBN 978-1-761-04114-3			
8	Charades		Lift-the-flap	14 September 2021	24	ISBN 978-1-761-04116-7			
9	Hammerbarn			18 January 2022	24	ISBN 978-1-761-04494-6			
10	Typewriter			17 May 2022	24	ISBN 978-1-761-04607-0			
11	Swim School			10 January 2023	24	ISBN 978-1-761-04793-0			
12	Shadowlands			4 April 2023	24	ISBN 978-1-761-04935-4			
13	Mini Bluey			9 May 2023	24	ISBN 978-1-761-04936-1			
14	Daddy Robot	Father's Day themed		11 July 2023	24	ISBN 978-1-761-04939-2			
15	Hooray, It's Easter! (Note: This is the only episodic book to not be named the same title as the episode name. The episode‘s real name is Easter.)	Easter themed	Lift-the-flap	6 February 2024	12	ISBN 978-1-761-34469-5			
16	BBQ			6 February 2024	24	ISBN 978-1-761-34466-4			
17	The Decider			14 May 2024	24	ISBN 978-1-761-34476-3			
18	The Doctor			11 June 2024	24	ISBN 978-1-761-34473-2			
19	Road Trip			6 August 2024	24	ISBN 978-1-761-34617-0			
20	Keepy Uppy			11 November 2025	24	ISBN 978-1-761-62017-1			

=== Episodic hardbacks ===
#	Title	Theme	Special features	Publication date	Pages	ISBN	References	Sales
1	Verandah Santa	Christmas themed		3 November 2020	32	ISBN 978-1-761-04061-0		
2	Mum School	Mother's Day themed		2 March 2021	32	ISBN 978-1-761-04113-6		
3	Daddy Putdown	Father's Day themed		3 August 2021	32	ISBN 978-1-761-04117-4		
4	Sleepytime		Fold-out pages	26 October 2021	32	ISBN 978-1-761-04119-8		
5	Christmas Swim	Christmas themed		2 November 2021	32	ISBN 978-1-761-04120-4		
6	Camping			14 December 2021	32	ISBN 978-1-761-04556-1		
7	Easter	Easter themed		15 February 2022	32	ISBN 978-1-761-04492-2		
8	Baby Race			16 March 2022	32	ISBN 978-1-761-04490-8		
9	Perfect	Father's Day themed	Wipe-clean card for drawing	19 July 2022	32	ISBN 978-1-761-04629-2		
10	Barky Boats			2 August 2022	32	ISBN 978-0-143-77789-2		
11	Queens	Mother's Day themed		28 March 2023	32	ISBN 978-1-761-04934-7		
12	Unicorse			6 June 2023	32	ISBN 978-1-761-04795-4		
13	Cricket			5 December 2023	32	ISBN 978-1-761-04941-5		
14	Bedroom			27 February 2024	32	ISBN 978-1-761-34390-2		
15	Fairytale			2 July 2024	32	ISBN 978-1-761-34478-7		
16	Pass the Parcel			1 April 2025	32			
17	Zoo			10 June 2025	32			

=== Episodic paperbacks (chapter novels) ===
#	Title	Publication date	Pages	ISBN	References
1	Trains	5 March 2024	80	ISBN 978-1-761-04110-5	
2	Bus	16 April 2024	80	ISBN 978-1-761-34507-4	
3	Taxi	28 May 2024	80	ISBN 978-1-761-34506-7	

=== Other board books ===
#	Title	Theme	Special features	Publication date	Pages	ISBN	Reference	Sales
1	All About Bluey		Shaped board book	2 June 2020	12	ISBN 978-1-760-89830-4		
2	All About Bingo		Shaped board book	2 June 2020	12	ISBN 978-1-760-89829-8		
3	At Home with the Heelers		Shaped board book	1 June 2021	10	ISBN 978-1-761-04141-9		
4	Bluey: Little Library		Four board books (Bluey, Bingo, Chilli and Bandit)	2 August 2022	48	ISBN 978-0-143-77891-2		
5	12 Days of Christmas	Christmas themed	Tabbed board book	1 November 2022	24	ISBN 978-1-761-04791-6		
6	Bluey and Friends: Little Library		Four board books (Snickers and Coco, Honey and Chloe, Lucky and Mackenzie and Indy and Rusty)	1 August 2023	48	ISBN 978-1-761-04938-5		

=== Other hardbacks ===
#	Title	Theme	Special features	Publication date	Pages	ISBN	Reference	Sales
1	My Dad is Awesome	Father's Day themed	"Written by Bluey and Bingo"	4 August 2020	48	ISBN 978-1-760-89940-0		
2	Let's Play Outside!		Magnet book	29 September 2020	10	ISBN 978-1-760-89992-9		
3	My Mum is the Best	Mother's Day themed	"Written by Bluey and Bingo"	2 March 2021	48	ISBN 978-1-761-04112-9		
4	A Jigsaw Puzzle Book		Four double-sided jigsaw puzzles	15 June 2022	8	ISBN 978-0-143-77787-8		
5	Bluey and Bingo's Fancy Restaurant Cookbook		Cookbook	15 June 2022	32	ISBN 978-1-761-04576-9		
6	Let's Get Spooky!	Halloween themed	Magnet book	20 September 2022	10	ISBN 978-1-761-04628-5		
7	Magic Xylophone		Sound book with xylophone buttons	29 November 2022	24	ISBN 978-0-143-77791-5		
8	I Love My Family	Valentine's Day themed	"Written by Bluey and Bingo"	17 January 2023	48	ISBN 978-1-761-04794-7		
9	The Big Blue Guy's Book of Dad Goals	Father's Day themed		11 July 2023	32	ISBN 978-1-761-34222-6		
10	Where's Bluey? At Christmas	Search-and-find book	Christmas themed	26 September 2023	32	ISBN 978-1-761-04627-8		
11	Treasury		Six stories in one (Fruit Bat, The Creek, Bob Bilby, The Pool, Charades and Hammerbarn)	31 October 2023	160	ISBN 978-1-761-34223-3		
12	What Would Bluey's Mum Do?	Mother's Day themed		19 March 2024	32	ISBN 978-1-761-34472-5		
13	Pull My Finger and Other Dad Jokes	Father's Day themed		9 July 2024	32	ISBN 978-1-761-34702-3		

=== Other paperbacks ===
#	Title	Subcategory	Theme	Publication date	Pages	ISBN	Reference	Sales
1	Time to Play!	Sticker activity book		5 November 2019	16	ISBN 978-1-760-89403-0		
2	Easter Fun!	Craft book	Easter themed	3 March 2020	24	ISBN 978-1-760-89689-8		
3	Big Backyard	Colouring book		31 March 2020	64	ISBN 978-1-760-89662-1		
4	Fun and Games	Colouring book		4 August 2020	64	ISBN 978-1-761-04019-1		
5	Hooray, It's Christmas!	Sticker activity book	Christmas themed	3 November 2020	32	ISBN 978-1-761-04000-9		
6	Bluey and Friends	Sticker activity book		5 January 2021	16	ISBN 978-1-761-04086-3		
7	Where's Bluey?	Search-and-find book		30 March 2021	32	ISBN 978-1-761-04111-2		
8	Giant Activity Pad	Sticker and activity pad		16 June 2021	48	ISBN 978-1-761-04115-0		
9	More Easter Fun!	Craft book	Easter themed	15 February 2022	24	ISBN 978-1-761-04626-1		
10	Big Book of Games	Activity book		12 April 2022	80	ISBN 978-1-761-04121-1		
11	Father's Day Fun!	Craft book	Father's Day themed	19 July 2022	24	ISBN 978-0-143-77786-1		
12	Merry Christmas	Colouring book	Christmas themed	18 October 2022	64	ISBN 978-0-143-77792-2		
13	Happy Easter!	Puffy sticker colouring book	Easter themed	31 January 2023	32	ISBN 978-1-761-04933-0		
14	How to Draw	Drawing instruction book		12 April 2023	48	ISBN 978-1-761-34098-7		
15	Super Stickers	Activity book		27 June 2023	64	ISBN 978-1-761-04937-8		
16	Awesome Advent Book Bundle	Advent calendar compilation of 24 story and activity books	Christmas themed	12 September 2023	576	ISBN 978-1-761-34224-0		
17	Christmas Craft	Craft book	Christmas themed	24 October 2023	24	ISBN 978-1-761-04945-3		
18	At the Beach	Colouring book		28 November 2023	32	ISBN 978-1-761-34310-0		
19	Let's Stick!	Sticker book		3 January 2024	24	ISBN 978-1-761-34543-2		
20	Hooray, Magic!	Puffy sticker colouring book		18 June 2024	32	ISBN 978-1-761-34479-4		

== Awards and nominations ==
Year	Award	Category	Recipient / Nominee	Result	Ref.
2020	Australian Book Industry Awards	Children's Picture Book of the Year (Ages 0–6)	Bluey, "The Beach" (Penguin)	Won	
2020	Australian Book Industry Awards	Book of the Year	Bluey, "The Beach" (Penguin)	Won	
2021	Australian Book Industry Awards	Children's Picture Book of the Year (Ages 0–6)	Bluey, "The Creek" (Penguin)	Nominated	
