= Allen (film) =

2026 Australian science-fiction family film

- Release poster
- Directed by: Daley Pearson; Jeffrey Walker
- Screenplay by: Daley Pearson; Sophie Miller
- Produced by: Sam Moor; Ross Allsop
- Starring: T. J. Power; Charlotte Nicdao; Josh Helman; Emily Barclay; Benedict Hardie
- Production company: Ludo Studio
- Distributed by: Netflix
- Release date: 12 November 2026
- Running time: 107 minutes
- Country: Australia
- Language: English

Allen is a 2026 Australian science-fiction family film directed by Daley Pearson and Jeffrey Walker and written by Pearson and Sophie Miller. Produced by Ludo Studio for Netflix, the film stars T. J. Power, Charlotte Nicdao, Josh Helman, Emily Barclay and Benedict Hardie. Power plays Petey, a man who reunites with the extraterrestrial friend he encountered as a child and has spent the following two decades waiting to see again.

The film was created by Pearson and marked Ludo Studio's first locally produced live-action feature film. Principal photography began in Queensland in July 2025. Allen was released globally on Netflix on 12 November 2026.

== Plot ==
In coastal Queensland during the 1990s, ten-year-old Petey encounters a small extraterrestrial after seeing an object fall from the sky. He names the creature Allen and forms a close friendship with him, eventually introducing him to his brother Jaden and their friend Carly. Allen later disappears without warning.

Twenty years later, Petey remains preoccupied with the possibility that Allen will return. His attempts to contact his childhood friend have left him increasingly disconnected from the people around him, while Jaden and Carly have moved on with their lives. Allen eventually returns, but the reunion is complicated by the reason for his return, forcing Petey to confront his attachment to the past and his relationships in the present.

== Cast ==
- T. J. Power as Petey
  - Edward A. O'Sullivan as young Petey
- Charlotte Nicdao as Carly
  - Caitlin Niemotko as young Carly
- Josh Helman as Jaden
  - Tom Broadmore as young Jaden
- Emily Barclay as Sarah
- Benedict Hardie as Rory
- Kaipo Heke as Nahuel
- Chaydon Jay as Roy
- Danny Kim as Jim

The principal cast was announced ahead of the film's release, with Power leading as the adult Petey and O'Sullivan portraying the character as a child.

== Production ==
=== Development ===
Pearson developed the original concept for Allen before co-founding Ludo Studio. The story was influenced by family adventure and science-fiction films centred on children encountering extraordinary companions, particularly E.T. the Extra-Terrestrial. Pearson conceived the film around the question of what might happen to a child from such a story after growing into adulthood.

Pearson told The Guardian that the themes of loss and nostalgia were also taken by the death of his older brother Liam from cancer when Pearson was 13. He said his attachment to films, music and objects from his childhood became associated with memories of his brother and family.

The project was initially developed as a Netflix television series and progressed close to production before being paused because of its scale and the technical requirements of portraying Allen. Pearson later redeveloped the project as a feature film, which he said had been his preferred format from the beginning. Sophie Miller initially joined the project as a script editor before becoming Pearson's co-writer, while Walker joined Pearson as co-director.

Pearson said that the filmmakers wanted the film to examine nostalgia without presenting either growing up or retaining a connection with childhood as inherently preferable. He described the film as attempting to balance childhood wonder with the consequences of being unable to move forward.

=== Filming ===
Netflix announced in July 2025 that principal photography had begun in Queensland, with production taking place in Brisbane and on the Gold Coast. Filming used Screen Queensland Studios in Brisbane, with Queensland locations chosen to reflect the coastal environment where Pearson had grown up.

The production received support from the Queensland Government through Screen Queensland's Production Attraction Strategy and Post, Digital and Visual Effects incentive. Pearson and Charlie Aspinwall served as executive producers for Ludo Studio alongside Miller. Sam Moor and Ross Allsop produced the film, with Lauren Brown serving as co-producer.

Allen was Ludo Studio's first locally produced live-action feature, following the company's work in animation and live-action television, including Bluey and Thou Shalt Not Steal.

=== Creature design and visual effects ===
The design of Allen underwent several iterations during development. Pearson told The Guardian that an early animatronic version of the character appeared more frightening than intended, leading the filmmakers to continue redesigning the creature.

The finished character combined practical puppetry with digital visual effects. Formation Effects worked on the physical creature, while Brisbane-based Alt.VFX contributed to the visual effects. Screen Queensland described Allen as the largest project undertaken by Alt.VFX at the time, with the company's visual-effects supervisor working closely with Pearson during post-production.

== Release ==
A special screening of Allen was held at Angelika Cinemas in Brisbane on 11 November 2026, attended by members of the cast and crew including Power, Helman, Barclay, Hardie, Pearson and Walker.

The film was released globally on Netflix on 12 November 2026.

== Reception ==
Critical response to Allen was mixed following its release.

Luke Buckmaster of The Guardian described the film as good-natured and noted its colourful, Amblin-influenced visual style, but criticised its reliance on familiar story devices and its explicit treatment of its themes of growing up and letting go.

Anthony Morris of ScreenHub gave the film four out of five stars. He praised its use of 1990s Australian popular culture and its approach to the conventions of family adventure films, while noting its themes concerning nostalgia and becoming overly attached to the past.

William Bibbiani of TheWrap considered the film an effective critique of nostalgia and the conventions of childhood fantasy films. He praised its willingness to subvert the type of story associated with films such as E.T. the Extra-Terrestrial, but felt that its more conventional adventure elements conflicted with its darker ideas and weakened its final act.

Sreeparna Sengupta of The Times of India gave the film two and a half out of five stars, describing it as sweet and sentimental but finding that its nostalgic premise and emotional themes did not develop into a sufficiently complex or engaging story.
