= Nick Howard (Australian singer) =

Australian singer

- Born: Australia
- Origin: Australia
- Genres: Pop
- Occupations: Singer; songwriter
- Instrument: Vocals
- Years active: 1994–1996
- Label: Ariola

Nick Howard is an Australian pop singer, who released one studio album in 1995. He is the father of singer The Kid LAROI.

In the mid 2000s, Howard wrote songs for TV show Girl TV and A gURLs Wurld which starred Charlotte Nicdao. As a music producer and sound engineer, Howard worked with Australian stars such as Bardot and Delta Goodrem.

== Discography ==
=== Albums ===
List of albums, with selected details
Title	Details
Sound of Breathing	Released: November 1995; Format: CD; Label: Ariola (76896404202)

=== Singles ===
List of singles, with selected chart positions
Title	Year	Peak chart positions		Album
Title	Year	AUS	UK	Album
"Everybody Needs Somebody"	1994	71	64	Sound of Breathing
"Who Fell in Love?" / "Down to the Water"	1995	52	—	Sound of Breathing
"I'll Build You a Bridge"	1996	—	—	Sound of Breathing
