= A gURLs wURLd =

- Also known as: Emma's Chatroom; Cyber Girls
- Genre: Sitcom
- Screenplay by: John Armstrong; Shelley Birse; Susan Hore; Noel Price; Kym Goldsworthy; Jorge Reiter; Katja Kittendorf
- Directed by: Ralph Strasser
- Starring: Marny Kennedy; Sophie Karbjinski; Charlotte Nicdao
- Theme music composer: Nick Howard; Luke Mynott
- Opening theme: "Friends"
- Ending theme: "Dance"
- Countries of origin: Australia; Singapore; Germany
- Original language: English
- No. of seasons: 1
- No. of episodes: 26

Production
- Executive producers: Noel Price; Angelika Paetow; Jo Rooney; Jacqueline Chan
- Producer: Noel Price
- Running time: 23 minutes
- Production companies: Screen Australia; Southern Star Entertainment

Original release
- Network: Nine Network Australia; Norddeutscher Rundfunk
- Release: 18 November 2010 – 20 January 2011

A Gurls Wurld (stylized as A gURLs wURLd; also known as Emma's Chatroom and Cyber Girls) is an Australian sitcom television series. The series was co-produced by Southern Star Entertainment, Southern Star Singapore, Screen Australia, and TV Plus Production for Nine Network Australia and Norddeutscher Rundfunk.

It first aired on 5 October 2009 in Mpcom and 18 November 2010 in Germany and in Australia, August 2010 in South America and concluded on 20 January 2011. There are 26 half-hour episodes.

Music composed by Nick Howard and Luke Mynott.

== Premise ==
Three young teenage girls – a German, a Singaporean, and an Australian – become friends while studying together at school in Singapore. When two of them must return to their homes in Germany and Australia, they get a present which is a USB. The USB makes them able to travel to each other through their computers. But this won't last forever.

== Cast ==
=== Main ===
- Marny Kennedy as Ally Henson, a 14-year-old student and dancer from the Australian countryside near Sydney. Her family owns a riding school where she often helps out by leading riding trips, instructing lessons, or taking care of the horses. She leads a love-hate relationship with Dan.
- Sophie Karbjinski as Emma Schubert, a 14-year-old girl from Hamburg. She is friends with Nicholas and has been dancing with him since they were in elementary school. During her stay in Singapore, she developed a crush on Jackie's older brother Josh and the two eventually start dating.
- Charlotte Nicdao as Jackie Lee, a 14-year-old city girl from Singapore. She is able to maintain her good grades while fulfilling her duties around the house and helping out in her grandmother's store. Although she dreams of becoming a dancer, she has to hide her future goals from her strict father, who forbids her to dance so that she can focus on her studies. She has a crush on Nicholas, Emma's friend, and the two start dating despite all odds.

=== Supporting ===
- Jannik Schümann as Nicholas Holz, a 16-year-old dance student and a close friend of Emma. He becomes interested in Jackie and they eventually start dating, although their relationship is hindered by the country difference.
- Takaya Honda as Josh Lee, Jackie's 16-year-old older brother. He is a gifted musician and football player and enjoys working with computers, which is why he creates the chatroom for his sister and her friends. He also often composes the music for their dances and works as a DJ and videographer on various occasions. Emma and him grow interested in each other during her stay in Singapore and they end up dating before Josh leaves on a computer science scholarship to the US.
- Luke Erceg as Dan Price, a 16-year-old boy who helped out at the Henson's riding school while Ally was in Singapore. The two have a complicated relationship at first because Ally feels like she has been replaced by him. But after some time, they grow fond of each other and admit that they might be developing feelings for each other.
- Chervil Tan as Chelsea Teo, the girls' dance rival and the daughter of a real estate mogul. She is manipulative and vindictive but also a capable, beautiful dancer who is matched in skill with the trio. Her two friends, Carla and Sophie, always follow her around.
- Veracia Yong as Carla, one of Chelsea's friends and a member of her dance team. She is always ready to go along with Chelsea's plans and has no own ambitions besides dancing.
- Iris Eleora Lim as Sophie, Chelsea's other underling and dance team member. She is 15 years old and possesses a photographic memory.
- Julie Wee as Michelle Juan, the girls' dance instructor. She choreographs all their dances, helps them perfect their form, and guides them through the National Dance Competition. Well-regarded in the dance world, Chelsea initially tries to hire her but fails when Michelle realizes how bad her personality is.

=== Recurring ===
- Don Halbert as Ben Henson, Ally's father. He owns a riding school near Sydney and makes his kids help out with his business.
- Clodagh Crowe as Sarah Henson, Ally's 40-year-old mother. She runs the riding school with her husband.
- Sam Fraser as Damon Henson, Ally's younger brother. He often meddles with Ally's business and his curiosity leads to him almost discovering the chatroom on multiple occasions.
- Michael Lott as Jürgen Schubert, Emma's father who spends most of his time at home with his daughter. He is an excellent cook and a Hamburger SV fan.
- Christine Kutschera as Tina Schubert, Emma's mother who is a successful businesswoman. Since she has to go on many business trips around the world, she spends little time at home.
- Chew Kin Wah as Mr. Lee, Jackie's strict father. He wants his daughter to excel at her studies while also learning Mandarin and helping out at her grandmother's shop. He forces her to quit dancing so that she can focus on her other duties, which leads to her continuing behind his back.
- Bernie Chan as Mrs. Lee, Jackie's mother. Although she is still strict, she is more lenient towards her daughter than her husband.
- Catherine Sng as Jackie's grandmother whose store Jackie often helps out at. Even though she is conservative in many respects, she cares for her granddaughter and encourages her to continue dancing.
- Gerald Chew as Mr. Teo, Chelsea's father. He is the wealthy owner of a construction and real estate company in Singapore. Although he spoils Chelsea financially, he does reprimand her when necessary and criticizes her spending habits.
- Kheng Hua Tan as Mrs. Teo, Chelsea's mother. Much like Chelsea, she has a prickly personality and doesn't like associating with people with a lower income than her.

== Episodes ==
No.	Title	Directed by	Written by	Original release date	Australian air date
1	"Reunion in Cyberspace" (German: Wiedersehen im Cyberspace)	Ralph Strasser	Noel Price	18 November 2010	2 July 2011
After spending a year studying together in Singapore, three friends – Ally from Australia, Emma from Germany, and Jackie, a Singaporean local – have to say goodbye. Ending their year together with one final dance performance as a trio, they are ready to part ways. But when Jackie's brother Josh gifts each of them a USB stick with their very own chatroom software, things take a surprising turn: Instead of just being a chatroom, the software beams them straight into cyberspace.
2	"Internet Travellers" (German: Netzreisende)	Ralph Strasser	Kym Goldsworthy	18 November 2010	23 July 2011
Emma, Jackie and Ally realise that keying in their access codes backwards gets them home, their panic turns to exhilaration. Not only have they found a way to meet in cyberspace but they can do it any time they want! The girls can't wait to try it again.
3	"In Love in Hamburg" (German: Verliebt in Hamburg)	Ralph Strasser	Kym Goldsworthy; Katja Kittendorf	22 November 2010	30 July 2011
As the excitement of their new chatroom kicks in, Emma invites Jackie and Ally to Hamburg for a dance battle she is performing in with her friend Nicholas.
4	"Jackie's Dream" (German: Jackies Traum)	Ralph Strasser	Shelley Birse	22 November 2010	6 August 2011
When Jackie's dad forces her to quit dancing and concentrate on her schoolwork, the girls decide to secretly enter the National Dance Competition in Singapore, proving that she can dance and get 100% on her report card.
5	"Alone in the Outback" (German: Allein im Outback)	Ralph Strasser	John Armstrong	23 November 2010	13 August 2011
Emma and Jackie are full of excitement about their Australian sleepover at Ally's farm. When they go for a horse ride however, things go horribly wrong. Emma's horse suddenly bolts away, leaves the trail and throws her, leaving her stranded and lost deep in the bush.
6	"Emma & Josh" (German: Emma & Josh)	Ralph Strasser	Kym Goldsworthy; Katja Kittendorf	24 November 2010	20 August 2011
Just when the girls think they've got life with the chatroom under control, things take a turn for the worse when Josh borrows Jackie's computer to use in his job as a DJ at a Halloween party. Emma and Ally are suddenly stranded in Singapore and unable to return home.
7	"Cellphone Debt" (German: Handyschulden)	Ralph Strasser	Jorg Reiter; Kym Goldsworthy	25 November 2010	27 August 2011
The future of the chatroom is thrown into uncertainty when Ally's father complains about her phone bills and threatens to confiscate her mobile. Desperate for money to pay her debts, Ally jumps at the chance of a dog-walking job for a neighbour of Emma's in Germany.
8	"Little Brother, Big Problem" (German: Kleiner Bruder, großes Problem)	Ralph Strasser	John Armstrong	29 November 2010	3 September 2011
a day at the beach turn into a disaster when Ally's brother Damon gets hold of her phone and accidentally transports himself into the chatroom—it looks like the chatroom's existence will no longer be a secret!
9	"Maxed Out" (German: Ausgepowert)	Ralph Strasser	John Armstrong	30 November 2010	10 September 2011
The girls dance practice becomes increasingly demanding after they learn that they have to be assessed by an official to actually enter the National Dance Competition. Forced to devote even more time to rehearsals, Jackie's obligations at home begin to weigh her down and she struggles to manage her very overcrowded schedule.
10	"The Video of the Year" (German: Das Video des Jahres)	Ralph Strasser	Jorg Reiter; Kym Goldsworthy	1 December 2010	17 September 2011
With the imminent release of rock sensation, David Kline's latest single, the entire teenage population goes Kline-crazy. Emma, Ally and Jackie are ecstatic when Nicolas asks them to a special launch party in Hamburg to celebrate the event.
11	"Ally & Dan" (German: Ally & Dan)	Ralph Strasser	Kym Goldsworthy	2 December 2010	24 September 2011
Ally's school is holding a formal dance and she's not looking forward to it. The whole idea of getting dressed up for an event she doesn't want to attend is bad enough but even worse, she doesn't have a date. Emma and Jackie promptly go into match making-mode, persuading a surprised Dan to ask her.
12	"The Diary" (German: Das Tagebuch)	Ralph Strasser	Shelley Birse	6 December 2010	3 December 2013
Convinced that Jackie is once again being overwhelmed by her hectic life style, Ally and Emma drag her to Australia in the hope of getting her to relax with a bush-walk and picnic. But the generosity isn't appreciated by Jackie who is quick to express her frustration at being hauled away from her commitments in Singapore. A growing tension starts to appear between the girls.
13	"The Art Theft" (German: Der Kunstraub)	Ralph Strasser	John Armstrong	7 December 2010	4 December 2013
Emma needs help because she's delayed doing an art class assignment until the last minute. As the task requires her to create a work in the style of another culture, Ally lends her an Indigenous Australian dot painting given to her family as a gift. Grateful, Emma takes the painting, intending to use it as inspiration for her own artwork and promises Ally that she'll return it the following day. But Emma loses track of time and ends up handing in the dot painting as her own!
14	"The Complete Leisure Stress" (German: Der totale Freizeitstress)	Ralph Strasser	Sue Hore	8 December 2010	5 December 2013
Ally's world comes to a crashing halt when her father organises a surprise party for her mother on the same day as the first dance elimination contest is to be held in Singapore.
15	"Busted" (German: Aufgeflogen)	Ralph Strasser	John Armstrong	9 December 2010	6 December 2013
Ally's brother, Damon, becomes increasingly suspicious of the sudden comings and goings of Jackie and Emma and he determines to find out what's behind it all. The situation is brought to a head when the girls have to learn a new dance routine in only two days. But because this period coincides with Open Day at the Henson's farm, Jackie and Emma are forced to travel back and forth to Ally's place to rehearse.
16	"Intrigue in Singapore" (German: Intrigen in Singapur)	Ralph Strasser	Sue Hore	4 January 2010	9 December 2013
Emma, Ally and Jackie are thrilled when Michelle tells them that they have been enrolled in an elite dance development camp. Their excitement quickly wears off though when, soon after arriving, they discover that archrival Chelsea and her entourage are also attending.
17	"Jackie & Nicholas" (German: Jackie & Nicholas)	Ralph Strasser	Katja Kittendorf; Kym Goldsworthy	5 January 2010	10 December 2013
When Nicholas insists on delivering a birthday present to Jackie at her house, he sets the girls some serious problems. He naturally thinks Jackie lives in Hamburg and so the first task for Emma is to find a house that they can pretend is Jackie's family home.
18	"A Matter of Life and Death" (German: Auf Leben und Tod)	Ralph Strasser	Shelley Birse	6 January 2010	11 December 2013
Ally isn't happy when she learns that Dan will be staying at her house for a few weeks. Even though she gets on okay with Dan these days, her main worry is about ensuring that the chatroom remains a secret.
19	"Lost in Lüneburg" (German: Lost in Lüneburg)	Ralph Strasser	Jörg Reiter; Kym Goldsworthy	10 January 2010	12 December 2013
When Ally has to do an architecture assignment for school, Emma suggests that she and Jackie join her in Germany to see some real Baroque buildings in the nearby town of Lüneburg.
20	"Network Outage" (German: Netzausfall)	Ralph Strasser	Sue Hore	11 January 2010	13 December 2013
Having been chosen to appear in a photo shoot for the cover of a dance magazine, Emma, Jackie and Ally head to Sydney to find some new costumes. The fun filled shopping expedition takes a turn for the worse however when Jackie's neighbours from Singapore accidentally spot her!
21	"Finally on Vacation?" (German: Endlich Ferien?)	Ralph Strasser	Sue Hore	12 January 2010	16 December 2013
It's exam time for Emma and she's suffering from exhaustion. On top of studying all night, it's coming up to the dance semi-finals and daily rehearsals are intense. Hoping to use her school holidays to get as much practice as possible, Emma is shocked to hear that her father has arranged a family holiday for the entire period.
22	"Maritime Rescue in Sydney" (German: Seenot in Sydney)	Ralph Strasser	Shelley Birse	13 January 2010	17 December 2013
The girls' leisurely boat trip off the Australian coast takes a dramatic turn when their dinghy has an engine malfunction. With no oars and no phone reception, Ally is forced to swim to shore to try and get help.
23	"Cellphone Virus" (German: Handy-Virus)	Ralph Strasser	John Armstrong	17 January 2010	29 March 2014
To her great dismay, Ally finds herself stuck in the chatroom when her mobile phone fails. Her hopes of a speedy escape are dashed when she learns that Jackie and Emma's phones are also playing up.
24	"Helping Chelsea" (German: Einsatz für Chelsea)	Ralph Strasser	John Armstrong	18 January 2010	5 April 2014
The girls decide to celebrate the end of their chatroom fourteen days before it's programmed to shut down completely. Then they can concentrate on what really matters — winning the dance finals. Choosing to have one fun activity in each country, they decide on jet-boating on Sydney Harbour, taking a bungee chair in Singapore and attending a dance party in Hamburg. But the day takes a curious turn when Jackie's in a shopping mall in Singapore and spots a teenage girl putting stolen CD's into Chelsea's bag.
25	"More Trouble for Jackie" (German: Mehr Ärger für Jackie)	Ralph Strasser	Jörg Reiter; Sue Hore	19 January 2010	12 April 2014
With the dance finals only days away, the girls run into some sudden and serious problems. Not only do they have to figure out a way to get their parents to sign their competition entry forms, but Chelsea is growing more and more suspicious about where Emma and Ally actually live.
26	"Finale" (German: Finale)	Ralph Strasser	Shelley Birse	20 January 2010	19 April 2014
With only twenty-four hours before the dance finals, a mixture of nerves and excitement fills the chatroom. Having worked towards this day for the past six months the pressure is on, especially for Jackie. Forbidden to dance because of study commitments, this is the one opportunity she has to prove to her father that she can combine dancing and schoolwork.

== Production ==
A Gurls Wurld was shot entirely on location in Hamburg, Sydney, and Singapore from January to August 2009. Filming for the episode Lost in Lüneburg took place in Lüneburg. The show's costumes were created by Imogen Price.

The Media Development Authority of Singapore participated in the production of the show.

== Release ==
Out of the production countries, the show was first aired in Singapore, followed by Germany and Australia. In Singapore, the show aired every Wednesday at 8 pm (SST) on Okto from 14 July 2010 to 5 January 2011.

In Germany, the show was distributed under the title Emmas Chatroom (stylized as Emm@s Ch@troom) by KiKa, a joint venture between ARD, NDR's parent company, and ZDF. It aired every Thursday at 8:15 pm (UTC+01:00) from 18 November 2010, to 20 January 2011. On its initial run, the first two episodes were broadcast back to back. Studio Hamburg Synchron was put in charge of the German localization. Marius Clarén and Bianca Krahl translated the scripts and directed the German dubbing. The German cast members also voiced their roles for the dub. Starting on 2 May 2022, the show reran on KiKa, with two episodes being broadcast every weekday at 3 pm. After concluding its rerun on 15 May 2022, the German version of the show was made available for streaming free of charge through KiKa's website. Prior to this, it could only be streamed through ARD's paid streaming service, ARD Plus.

In Australia, the show ran every Saturday at 1:30 pm (AEST) from 2 July 2011 on Nine Network. On 24 September 2011, the show was dropped by the network after Episode 11. On 3 December 2013, the show was picked up again and started airing on ABC3. It aired on weekdays at 2:30 pm (AEST) until 19 April 2014. Each episode could be streamed for a week after its original broadcast on ABC iview.

The show was also screened in Belgium, France, Ireland, Israel, Italy, Latin America (Central America, South America, the Caribbean), Mexico, Norway, and Sweden. It is available for streaming on Amazon Freevee, Prime Video, Tubi, and through the ARD Plus channel on Apple TV+ and MagentaTV in selected countries and territories.

=== International broadcast ===
Country/Region	Network	Original run	Notes
Singapore	Okto	14 July 2010 – 5 January 2011	
Germany	KiKa	18 November 2010 – 20 January 2011	The show was rerun from 2 May 2022 – 15 May 2022.
Australia	Nine Network; ABC3	2 July 2011 – 19 April 2014	The show was dropped by Nine Network after Episode 11 and was picked up again by ABC3.
Belgium	Ketnet	9 November 2010 – 14 December 2010	The program was aired in Dutch.
Ireland	TRTÉ		
Israel	Arutz HaYeladim		
Italy	Disney Channel	18 September 2010 – 12 December 2010	The show was rerun on Italia 1 from 11 January 2014 – 5 April 2014.
Mexico	Once TV Mexico		
Latin America	HBO Family	August 2010	The show was distributed under the title El Ciber – El Mundo de las Chicas (lit. 'The Cyberspace – The World of Girls').
Sweden	Barnkanalen		The show was streamed on the kids channel of the publicly funded news and TV channel SVT (Sveriges Television) under the name "Kompisar på nätet" - Friends online
