= 7DaysLater =

Australian comedy television series

#7DaysLater
- Genre: Comedy
- Created by: Daley Pearson; Nicholas Boshier
- Written by: Daley Pearson; Nicholas Boshier
- Directed by: Daley Pearson
- Starring: Nicholas Boshier; Aaron McCann; Florence Noble
- Composer: Joff Bush
- Country of origin: Australia
- Original language: English
- No. of series: 1
- No. of episodes: 7

Production
- Producers: Michelle Hardy; Daley Pearson; Charlie Aspwainll; Nick Boshier
- Cinematography: James L. Brown; Josh Flavell
- Running time: 7 minutes
- Production company: Ludo Studio

Original release
- Network: ABC
- Release: 21 October – 2 December 2013

#7DaysLater is an Australian comedy television series that created episodes from audience ideas within 7 days.

The series was created by Daley Pearson and Nick Boshier. Described as "Australia's first crowd-sourced comedy series" the show has one week to go from audience ideas to script, produce, film and edit a 7 minute episode in time for the next air date. In addition to regular cast members, primarily YouTube celebrities, each week the show had a special guest star. Guests included Megan Washington, John Jarratt, Jemaine Clement, Colin Mochrie and Corey Feldman. #7DaysLater won an International Emmy Award for Best Digital Program: Fiction.

== Cast ==
- Nicholas Boshier
- Aaron McCann
- Florence Noble
- Susanna Dekker
- Bishanyia Vincent
- Jordan Raskopoulos
- Paul Michael Ayre
- Neel Kolhatkar
- Christiaan Van Vuuren
- Alex Williamson
