= The Strange Chores =

Australian animated television series

- Series Posters
- Genre: Comedy; Mystery
- Created by: Charlie Aspinwall; Daley Pearson
- Showrunner: Daley Pearson
- Directed by: Scott Vanden Bosch
- Voices of: Julian Dennison; Cash Gallagher-Ruru; Charlotte Nicdao; Michael Philippou; Nick Tate
- Composers: Joff Bush; Daniel O'Brien (series 2)
- Country of origin: Australia
- Original language: English
- No. of seasons: 3
- No. of episodes: 78

Production
- Executive producers: Michael Carrington (series 1); Jan Stradling (series 2); Michael Drake (series 2)
- Producers: Charlie Aspinwall; Colin South
- Running time: 11 minutes
- Production companies: Ludo Studio; Media World Pictures

Original release
- Network: ABC Me (series 1–2); ABC Family (series 3)
- Release: 31 October 2019 – 29 November 2024

The Strange Chores is an Australian animated television series created by Charlie Aspinwall and Daley Pearson and co-produced by Ludo Studio and Media World Pictures. It premiered on ABC Me on 31 October 2019.

The show centres around two teenage warrior-heroes (Charlie and Pierce) and a spirited ghost girl (Que) who master the skills they need to replace an ageing monster-slayer by doing his supernatural chores.

The third series premiered on ABC Family on 7 June 2024.

== Plot ==
Two teenagers, Charlie and Pierce, discover that their "kooky neighbour" Old Man Helsing's house at the end of their street is secretly a portal to supernatural worlds. Helsing thinks he might be getting too old for all his adventures, so he allows them to become his apprentices. A mischievous ghost girl, Que, joins them on their adventures as they complete Helsing's freaky, bizarre, and sometimes terrifying chores.

== Characters ==
=== Main ===
- Charlie is a tenacious but often impetuous teenage boy whose passion often gets him into trouble.
- Pierce is Charlie's shy but dedicated best friend.
- Que is a friendly ghost girl with long blue hair who lives in Helsing's attic.
- Old Man Helsing is an elderly monster hunter that decides to accept Charlie, Pierce and Que as his monster hunters in training.
- Snorp is a small green monster who behaves like a dog and is Helsing's pet, communicates by saying "Snorp".

== Production ==
The Strange Chores is produced entirely in Australia by Ludo Studio and Media World Production, with animation provided by 12Field Animation using Toon Boom Harmony. Production on the first series of the show took 95 weeks including over 5,000 scenes, 400 rigs, 500 props and 3000 background designs. Ludo aimed for an older audience for this show (8 to 12-years-old) when compared to their massively popular preschool series Bluey.

In July 2020, the series was renewed for a second season.

== Episodes ==
=== Series 1 (2019) ===
No.	Title	Directed by	Written by	Original release date	POP UK
1	"Witch Watch"	Scott Vanden Bosch	Luke Tierney	31 October 2019	4 November 2019
Pierce objects to Witchy being released on parole and spies on her to gather evidence that she's up to no good.
2	"Stop the Monster Slime"	Scott Vanden Bosch	John McGeachin	31 October 2019	5 November 2019
Pierce's new slime consumes the town, leaving the gang trapped inside a convenience store.
3	"Stop the Monster Battles"	Scott Vanden Bosch	Tim Bain	1 November 2019	6 November 2019
Pierce gets involved in a rap battle with Monster Head.
4	"Survive Fright Swap"	Scott Vanden Bosch	Brendan Luno	2 November 2019	7 November 2019
Helsing and Dracula switch roles for a reality TV show.
5	"Put the Barbarian Back in the Box"	Scott Vanden Bosch	John McGeachin	3 November 2019	8 November 2019
When Charlie and Que refuse to play by the rules of a board game, the pieces come to life.
6	"Catch a Slimer"	Scott Vanden Bosch	Brendan Luno	4 November 2019	11 November 2019
The gang attempt to find who's responsible for a string of sliming attacks.
7	"Save Li'l Helsing"	Scott Vanden Bosch	Brendan Luno	5 November 2019	12 November 2019
Helsing goes undercover as a student to help uncover vampires at the gang's school.
8	"Don't Trick or Tweet"	Scott Vanden Bosch	John McGeachin	31 October 2019	13 November 2019
Charlie accidentally lets loose a monster who causes havoc at Que and Pierce's Halloween party.
9	"Undo the Genie's Wish"	Scott Vanden Bosch	Luke Tierney	6 November 2019	14 November 2019
Under instructions to find a genie lamp to wish away an incoming asteroid, the gang instead use the lamp to make their own wishes come true.
10	"Call a Monster"	Scott Vanden Bosch	Luke Tierney	7 November 2019	15 November 2019
The gang's prank calling leads to them incurring the wrath of a monster named Frank.
11	"Finish the Mop's Bucket List"	Scott Vanden Bosch	John McGeachin	8 November 2019	18 November 2019
The gang bring to life a living mop and end up helping it to fulfil its bucket list.
12	"Escape the Strange Chores"	Scott Vanden Bosch	John McGeachin	9 November 2019	19 November 2019
Charlie and Pierce end up trapped in Que's video game.
13	"Clean The Toilet."	Scott Vanden Bosch	Daley Pearson	10 November 2019	20 November 2019
Charlie attempts to get rid of the singing monster, leading to chaos.
14	"Host a Monster Hunter Tournament"	Scott Vanden Bosch	Luke Tierney	11 November 2019	21 November 2019
A disguised Charlie enters a monster hunter tournament.
15	"Swap Back the Body Swap"	Scott Vanden Bosch	Luke Tierney	12 November 2019	22 November 2019
Helsing's mind swap ray leads to him and Snorp switching bodies, which spells trouble when an inspector arrives.
16	"Tame the Wild Wild Pest"	Scott Vanden Bosch	John McGeachin	13 November 2019	25 November 2019
When Snorp grows to giant size, the gang find themselves dealing with a community of fleas living on Snorp's skin.
17	"Clean the Car"	Scott Vanden Bosch	Luke Tierney	14 November 2019	26 November 2019
Que and Pierce end up taking Helsing's car into space while attempting to clean it.
18	"Shut the Freezer"	Scott Vanden Bosch	Brendan Luno	15 November 2019	27 November 2019
When Charlie leaves Helsing's freezer open, an ice monster escapes.
19	"Outsmart a Smart House"	Scott Vanden Bosch	Daley Pearson	16 November 2019	28 November 2019
Helsing's new home security system becomes a threat to the gang.
20	"Train Snorp"	Scott Vanden Bosch	John McGeachin	17 November 2019	29 November 2019
Charlie and Que attempt to train Snorp, while Pierce attempts to train a living table.
21	"Stop the Dummy's Dummy"	Scott Vanden Bosch	Luke Tierney	18 November 2019	2 December 2019
A dummy joins the gang, but his own dummy attempts to frame him for a string of mishaps against the gang.
22	"Survive the Strange Loop"	Scott Vanden Bosch	Luke Tierney	19 November 2019	3 December 2019
Using Helsing's quantum remote, Pierce loops time repeatedly in order to get Charlie and Que to remember his birthday.
23	"Babysit the Mummy"	Scott Vanden Bosch	John McGeachin	20 November 2019	4 December 2019
The gang babysit a mummy who steals their senses.
24	"Get Back the Monster Hand"	Scott Vanden Bosch	Daley Pearson	21 November 2019	5 December 2019
Charlie smuggles a monster hand into school, causing chaos.
25	"Clean the Archive Room"	Scott Vanden Bosch	Brendan Luno	22 November 2019	6 December 2019
The gang are stuck in the archive room when it floods. Meanwhile, Helsing is visited by government inspectors.
26	"Scare Helsing"	Scott Vanden Bosch	John McGeachin	23 November 2019	9 December 2019
The gang try to discover Helsing's greatest fear in an attempt to scare him.

== Broadcast ==
The first series of The Strange Chores was released to ABC iview on 31 October 2019, accompanying the series premiere on the same day. The episode "Don't Trick or Tweet" also aired as a preview before the first two episodes. In the United Kingdom and Ireland, the series aired on Pop on 1 November, one day after the Australian premiere. In 2020, it was also broadcast on Disney Channel Asia and CBC Kids.

The second series was released to ABC iview on 24 June 2022, which, again, accompanied the series premiere on the same day. Also, like the first series, the episode "Haunt the House" was aired as a preview to the series on April 8 of that same year.
