= Ludo Studio =

Australian production company

Ludo Studio Pty. Ltd.
- Type: Private
- Industry: Live action Animation
- Founded: 2012; 14 years ago
- Founders: Daley Pearson; Charlie Aspinwall
- Headquarters: Fortitude Valley, Queensland
- Website: ludostudio.com.au

Ludo Studio Pty. Ltd. is an Australian independent live-action and animation production company based in Fortitude Valley, Queensland. Founded by Daley Pearson and Charlie Aspinwall in 2012, it is known for producing the television series Bluey (2018), Thou Shalt Not Steal (2024), The Strange Chores (2019), Robbie Hood (2019) and #7DaysLater (2013), and also producing the web series Doodles (2015) and Content (2019).

== History ==
Daley Pearson and Charlie Aspinwall founded Ludo Studio in 2012. The company is based in Fortitude Valley, Queensland.

The studio has been at the forefront of development for experimental Australian multimedia series. In 2013, the studio released #7DaysLater, a multi-platform comedy series, where each episode was created in 7 days from the audience's online pitches. The series was the first interactive comedy series commissioned by the Australian Broadcasting Corporation. The series won an International Emmy Award for Best Digital Program: Fiction. The studio also won a Best Kids' Digital Program International Emmy in 2017 for their web series Doodles. The series featured animations of drawings submitted by the audience. In 2019, Ludo Studio partnered with ABC to create Content, Australia's first-ever vertical video series.

In 2016, Joe Brumm approached the studio with a one-minute pilot episode for his Children's television series Bluey. Pearson and Aspinwall took Brumm's pitch to the MIPCOM television conference, where they began looking for investors. The ABC offered the studio $20,000 for a revised seven-minute pilot, in preparation for the Asian Animation Summit in late 2017. The ABC partnered with the BBC to commission the series for an initial 52-episode run. The series was produced entirely by the studio in South Brisbane. After the series launched in 2018, it quickly found global critical and commercial success as it expanded to air in 60 different countries.

In 2024, Bluey was awarded a special recognition award from the Australian High Commissioner in London, in acknowledgement of its significant cultural impact in the UK and around the world. Australia House was transformed into "Bluey House" for the occasion, with the building redecorated and official signage temporarily replaced.

Following their Bluey partnership, ABC commissioned an original animated supernatural comedy, The Strange Chores, created by Pearson and Aspinwall. The pair had previously attempted to pitch the series in 2013. The series began to air on ABC Me for Halloween in 2019.

Australian filmmaker Dylan River has partnered with Ludo Studio to bring two of his projects to the screen. In 2019, the studio produced Robbie Hood, River's reimagining of the Robin Hood narrative in contemporary Alice Springs. The series follows Robbie, a 13-year-old Indigenous Australian as he traverses his neighbourhood and evades the local police. In 2024, Stan released River and Ludo Studio's series Thou Shalt Not Steal, following a pair of teenagers as they are chased across the desert by a sex worker and fraudulent preacher.

At the 2019 Screen Producers Australia Awards, Ludo Studio won Media Super Production Business of the Year. The award recognises a business that has produced an "outstanding body of work" and made a significant contribution to the progression of the Australian screen industry over the previous 12 months. The studio also took home Animated Series Production of the Year for Bluey, Online Series Production of the Year for Robbie Hood, and the Screen Business Export Award for Bluey.

Ludo Studio was voted one of the Time 100 Most Influential Companies in 2024.

The studio partnered with ACMI in 2024 to create a $10,000 animation residency for an emerging Australian animator or animation team. The program was only open to people with up to two professional credits, with the intent of developing their projects for the local & international market.

Screen Australia awarded the studio story development funding in 2024 for a new animated series, Willy. Set in 2003, the series follows the sexual awakening of a 15-year-old boy in a rural Australian town.

In 2024, Ludo Studio announced the production of a Bluey feature film in partnership with BBC Studios and The Walt Disney Company. The project is the studio's first feature film.

== Filmography ==
=== Films ===
Year	Title	Notes
2026	Allen	co-production with Netflix
2027	The Bluey Movie	co-production with BBC Studios and Walt Disney Studios Motion Pictures

=== Television and web series ===
Year	Title	Network	Notes	Ref.
2013	#7DaysLater	ABC		
2015–2017	Doodles	Online & ABC Me		
2018–present	Bluey	ABC		
2019	Robbie Hood	SBS	with Since1788 Productions	
2019	Content	ABC		
2019–2024	The Strange Chores	ABC	with Media World Pictures	
2024	Thou Shalt Not Steal	Stan	with Since1788 Productions	
