= Daley Pearson =

Australian producer (born 1984–1985)

- Born: 1984 or 1985 (age 41–42)
- Education: Griffith Film School
- Occupations: Writer; director; producer; actor
- Employer: Ludo Studio
- Notable work: The Strange Calls; #7DaysLater; Team Thor; Bluey; The Strange Chores; Content; Thor: Love and Thunder; Talk to Me; Thou Shalt Not Steal

Daley Pearson (b. 1984 or 1985) is an Australian writer, director, producer, and actor. He is the co-founder of Ludo Studio, the creator of the series The Strange Calls (2012), The Strange Chores (2019–present), #7DaysLater (2013), and an executive producer on Bluey (2018–present), Content (2019), and Thou Shalt Not Steal (2024). He also plays Darryl Jacobson on Team Thor (2016–2018) and the film Thor: Love and Thunder (2022) and created the concept for the Australian horror film Talk to Me (2022).

== Early life ==
Pearson (b. 1984 or 1985) grew up in Coolum Beach, Queensland. He graduated from Marist College Ashgrove in 2001.

Using his father's digital camera, Pearson began filmmaking at an early age. Of his early short films, Pearson said the most notable was "a 15-minute adventure" he made when he was 11 years old, "using my vast collection of Ninja Turtle toys, a techno-drome play set and a turtle van."

Pearson studied film at Griffith Film School. By the age of 22, he had several critically acclaimed short films.

== Career ==
In 2010, Pearson directed his first feature film, $quid, about a New Year's Eve party cruise that comes under attack by a giant squid. The film was an adaptation of Pearson & Luke Tierney's Tropfest short of the same name. Pearson would later recall "Nothing happened with it. It wasn’t Australian and it didn’t really feel even me, to be honest." [sic]

In 2012, Pearson's first television series,The Strange Calls, was released by the ABC. The comedy series, based on Pearson's short film of the same name, was filmed in his hometown of Coolum. It follows a cop who has been demoted to the night watch and must investigate an increasingly absurd array of supernatural disturbances.

Pearson founded Ludo Studio with Charlie Aspinwall in 2012. The production company was voted one of the Time 100 Most Influential Companies in 2024.

Exploring the possibilities for digital storytelling, Pearson created the 2013 web series #7DaysLater. Each episode was based on pitches from an online audience and produced by comedians in 7 days. It was the first interactive series commissioned by the ABC. The series won an International Emmy Award for Best Digital Program: Fiction.

In 2016, Pearson appeared alongside Chris Hemsworth in the viral Team Thor mockumentary, directed by Taika Waititi for Marvel Studios. The video, used to explain Thor's absence in Captain America: Civil War, acted as a teaser for the ongoing production of Thor: Ragnarok in Queensland. Pearson later would reprise his character, Darryl, in further digital shorts and Thor: Love and Thunder.

Pearson and Aspinwall began developing Bluey after they were approached by the series creator, Joe Brumm, in 2016. The pair took Brumm's one-minute pilot episode to the MIPCOM television conference, where they began looking for investors. In 2017, the ABC in partnership with the BBC picked up the series for an initial, 52-episode run. The series was produced entirely by Ludo Studio in South Brisbane. The series, which launched in 2018, quickly found global critical and commercial success as it expanded to air in 60 different countries. In 2024, the series was awarded a special recognition award from the Australian High Commissioner in London, in acknowledgement of its significant cultural impact in the UK and around the world.

Bluey was not Pearson's first foray into animated television. Pearson and Aspinwall had previously attempted to pitch an animated supernatural comedy, The Strange Chores, in 2013. The series however did not come to fruition until 2019, when it began to air on ABC ME for Halloween.

In 2018, Pearson sent a short horror film script to Australian comedians Danny and Michael Philippou. As Michael Philippou began to do his draft, the script quickly began to expand into a feature film. Talk to Me follows the story of a group of teenagers who allow themselves to become possessed by a cursed hand for recreational thrills. The low budget horror became a breakout success when it was released globally in 2023.

In 2026, Pearson co-wrote and co-directed the Netflix feature film Allen with Jeffrey Walker, with Pearson writing the screenplay alongside Sophie Miller. The film, produced by Ludo Studio, marked the company's first live-action feature and was released globally by Netflix on 12 November 2026.

== Awards and nominations ==
Year	Title	Award	Title	Result	Ref
2014	International Digital Emmy Awards	Digital Program - Fiction	#7DaysLater	Won	
2016	International Digital Emmy Awards	Kids: Digital	Doodles	Won	
2017	AACTA Awards	Best Online Video or Series	Doodles	Nominated	
2019	AACTA Awards	Best Children's Program	Bluey	Won	
2019	AACTA Awards	Best Online Drama or Comedy	Content	Nominated	
2020	AACTA Awards	Best Children's Program	Bluey	Won	
2021	AACTA Awards	Best Children's Program	Bluey	Won	
2022	AACTA Awards	Best Children's Program	Bluey	Won	
2024	AACTA Awards	Best Children's Program	Bluey	Won	
