= Content (web series) =

2019 Australian comedy web series

Content is a 2019 Australian comedy web series that was produced by Ludo Studio in Brisbane, Queensland, for the Australian Broadcasting Corporation (ABC). It is the first scripted comedy series to be presented in the vertical video format and designed to be watched on smartphones. The show stars Charlotte Nicdao as 23-year-old wannabe influencer Lucy Goosey and Gemma Bird Matheson as her down-to-earth friend Daisy Laing.

In the first episode, Lucy flips her car while simultaneously webcasting and driving, earning her the nickname #Flipgirl. Her video goes viral on social media and she attempts – unsuccessfully at first – to capitalise on her instant fame. After exploring several video genres, Lucy finally finds real celebrity but her friendship with Daisy is ruined. In the final episode, Lucy publicly apologises to Daisy, who attempts to contact Lucy.

When a clip showing the accident was webcast on Facebook, some viewers mistook it for a real-life accident and it went viral, attracting 1.2 million views on Twitter. Reviewers gave Content a mostly positive reception.

== Plot ==
Charlotte Nicdao and Gemma Bird Matheson as Lucy and Daisy in Content, which plays out entirely through the lead characters' smartphones.

Twenty-three-year-old graduate Lucy Goosey crashes her car while live-streaming on Facebook. The video of the accident goes viral; awed by the number of viewers it attracts, Lucy attempts to become an internet celebrity. To capitalise on her crash video's viral status, Lucy conducts a live mukbang, attempts yoga and gets lost while bushwalking. When her Instagram account is hacked, Lucy's private messages and an embarrassing image are exposed, costing Daisy a job promotion.

After a failed attempt at making a make-up video, Lucy posts a rant about internet beauty gurus; her video goes viral and her Instagram account becomes verified, launching her career as a social media influencer. When Lucy attends an influencers' party rather than Daisy's graduation, Daisy is upset and ends their friendship. In the final episode, Lucy apologises to Daisy in a public YouTube video; Daisy watches the video and, feeling worried, she calls Lucy but quickly aborts the call. When Lucy – who has a new phone – sends Daisy a text message enquiring about the caller's identity, Daisy replies, "soz, wrong number".

== Writing and production ==
Content was written by Anne Barnes and produced by Ludo Studio for the Australian Broadcasting Corporation (ABC). The show's executive producer and director Daley Pearson initially wanted to pitch the idea of a comedy about a 19-year-old life coach. He said, "We thought the show would be about a big influencer and it was set on their phone, but then I was like, I don't want to watch a show about a celebrity".

Pearson's idea changed into one of a show about an ordinary person who suddenly and unexpectedly experiences internet fame. Que Minh Luu, another of Content's four executive producers, pitched to the ABC the idea of a television show that could not be watched on television; the ABC liked the idea but wanted more information. Together with the ABC's Content Innovation Lab, Luu's department made some prototype videos to demonstrate the concept. They engaged writer Ann Barnes, who developed a script template for the series. Barns said:

It was a lot of writing the world: comments, tweets, text messages. A lot of it was writing ancillary content, but that's what makes the story ... what's on Lucy's Facebook, what her mum writes. Stuff you wouldn't think of, like when someone sends a text message, what were the five text messages above it? I'd have to write all that.

The process of developing the concept of telling a story entirely through a smartphone and persuading backers to finance the project took two years. Screen Queensland and Screen Australia joined the ABC in funding the series after Ludo produced a sample video. Except for a few key moments, the smartphone interface elements of Content were not screen-captured but were animated by Canadian film-making collective Shy Kids. To reflect the characters' smartphone use, the animators needed to replicate the behaviour of a real smartphone. Greg Francis of Shy Kids said, "It was imperative to us that the show feels like an honest depiction of two 20-somethings on their phones".

Lucy's first-episode car accident was filmed at a stunt park. To simulate the crash, the static car—with Nicdao sitting in the driver's seat—was rolled onto its side using attached wires. Flying shards of glass and external elements were then added electronically.

== Reception ==
=== Going viral ===
Shortly after the first episode of Content was posted on the internet, Ludo's co-founder Daley Pearson promoted the show on Reddit. Around the same time, another Reddit user posted images from the show. On Twitter, user @ArsonArtist posted the footage with the caption: "Don't stream and drive, thot". The clip posted to Twitter received around 500,000 views on that platform; many Twitter users believed the incident was real and criticised Lucy for her poor driving. Charlotte Nicdao responded to the video's viral status with the tweet; "DAISY IM VIRAL".

=== Critical reviews ===
Jini Maxwell of Screenhub Australia awarded Content three-and-a-half stars out of five. Watching it on a smartphone, the reviewer called the format "immersive" and said they felt a "moment of panic" during Lucy's first-episode FaceTime call, "half-expecting my own face to appear on-screen when the call is answered". Maxwell said the characters' text messages "felt genuine", which is " a testament to strong writing". The reviewer also said the show's tone "feels judgemental", that Lucy is "held up as the ultimate millennial joke", and that "it's disappointing to see such an interesting format wasted on a condescending sentiment". Maxwell's review concludes; "With a format as interesting as this, and cast and writing team who are clearly engaged with their material, I really hope the show gets brave enough to bore me a little more".

Caitlin Welsh of Mashable said Lucy is "a bit annoying and occasionally too one-note" and that Nicdao and Bird Matheson "have an easy chemistry that's explored in creative ways without breaking the conceit". She said the series' lack of pandering to those unfamiliar with the world of social media is "a smart choice that's instrumental in making it feel real"; that the show "feels like a surprisingly coherent cross between a regular TV show and looking over someone's shoulder at their phone on the bus ", and that it "manages to show how we build real lives and relationships through our phone screens, as well as how we can break them".

Bridget McManus of Sydney Morning Herald awarded Content three-and-a-half stars out of five and wrote; "this peek into the online world of Lucy Goosey ... should terrify – and possibly irritate – anyone over the age of 30", and said the show is "a clever step into the future".

=== Awards ===
Content won the 2020 Rose d'Or award in the category Social Media and Video Series.
