= Thor: Ragnarok =

2017 Marvel Studios film

- Theatrical release poster
- Directed by: Taika Waititi
- Written by: Eric Pearson; Craig Kyle; Christopher L. Yost
- Based on: Thor by: Stan Lee; Larry Lieber; Jack Kirby
- Produced by: Kevin Feige
- Starring: Chris Hemsworth; Tom Hiddleston; Cate Blanchett; Idris Elba; Jeff Goldblum; Tessa Thompson; Karl Urban; Mark Ruffalo; Anthony Hopkins
- Cinematography: Javier Aguirresarobe
- Edited by: Joel Negron; Zene Baker
- Music by: Mark Mothersbaugh
- Production company: Marvel Studios
- Distributed by: Walt Disney Studios Motion Pictures
- Release dates: October 10, 2017 (El Capitan Theatre); November 3, 2017 (United States)
- Running time: 130 minutes
- Country: United States
- Language: English
- Budget: $180 million
- Box office: $855 million

Thor: Ragnarok is a 2017 American superhero film based on the Marvel Comics character Thor, produced by Marvel Studios and distributed by Walt Disney Studios Motion Pictures. It is the sequel to Thor (2011) and Thor: The Dark World (2013), and is the 17th film in the Marvel Cinematic Universe (MCU). The film was directed by Taika Waititi from a screenplay by Eric Pearson and the writing team of Craig Kyle and Christopher Yost, and stars Chris Hemsworth as Thor alongside Tom Hiddleston, Cate Blanchett, Idris Elba, Jeff Goldblum, Tessa Thompson, Karl Urban, Mark Ruffalo, and Anthony Hopkins. In the film, Thor must escape the alien planet Sakaar in time to save Asgard from Hela (Blanchett) and the impending Ragnarök.

A third Thor film was confirmed in January 2014, when Kyle and Yost began work on the screenplay. The involvement of Hemsworth and Hiddleston was announced that October, and the film's title was revealed to be Thor: Ragnarok later that month. Waititi joined the film as director a year later, after Thor: The Dark World director Alan Taylor chose not to return. Ruffalo joined the cast reprising the role of Bruce Banner / Hulk from previous MCU films, which allowed elements of the 2006 comic storyline "Planet Hulk" to be adapted for Ragnarok. The rest of the cast, including Blanchett as Hela, was confirmed in May 2016, with Pearson's involvement revealed at the start of filming that July. Principal photography took place in Brisbane and Sydney, Australia, with the film also having exclusive use of Village Roadshow Studios in Oxenford, concluding in October 2016.

Thor: Ragnarok premiered at the El Capitan Theatre in Hollywood, Los Angeles, on October 10, 2017, and was released in the United States on November 3, as part of Phase Three of the MCU. The film received praise for its acting and Waititi's direction, as well as the action sequences, visual effects, musical score, and humor, with many critics considering it to be the best installment of the Thor franchise. It grossed $855 million, becoming the highest-grossing film of the series and the ninth-highest-grossing film of 2017. A sequel, Thor: Love and Thunder, was released in July 2022.

== Plot ==
Two years after the Battle of Sokovia, (Note: As depicted in Avengers: Age of Ultron (2015)) Thor is imprisoned by the fire demon Surtur, who reveals that Thor's father Odin is no longer on Asgard. He explains that Asgard will soon be destroyed during the prophesied apocalypse Ragnarök, once Surtur unites his crown with the Eternal Flame that burns in Odin's vault. Thor frees himself, defeats Surtur, and takes his crown, believing he has prevented Ragnarök. Thor returns to Asgard to find Heimdall gone and his estranged brother Loki posing as Odin. He forces Loki to help find their father, who Loki put a spell on after his presumed sacrifice years before.

With directions from Stephen Strange, they find Odin in Norway. Odin explains that he is dying, Ragnarök is imminent despite Thor's efforts, and his death will free his firstborn child, Hela, from Hel, a prison she was sealed in long ago. Hela, a sibling Thor and Loki did not know existed, was the leader of Asgard's armies and conquered the Nine Realms with Odin, but he imprisoned her and wrote her out of history after she became too bloodthirsty and did not share his views on peace.

Odin dies, and Hela appears after being freed from her prison. She destroys Thor's hammer Mjolnir, and pursues the two as they attempt to flee through the Bifröst Bridge, knocking them out into space. Arriving in Asgard, Hela defeats its army, slays the Warriors Three, and resurrects the ancient dead who once fought with her, including her giant wolf Fenris. She appoints the Asgardian Skurge as her executioner. Hela plans to use the Bifröst to expand Asgard's empire, but Heimdall takes the sword that controls the Bifröst.

Meanwhile, Thor crash-lands on Sakaar, a garbage planet surrounded by wormholes. A slave trader designated Scrapper 142 subdues him with an obedience disk and sells him as a gladiator to Sakaar's ruler, the Grandmaster, with whom Loki has already ingratiated himself. Thor recognizes 142 as a Valkyrie, one of a legendary force of female warriors who were killed fighting Hela eons ago. Thor is forced to compete in the Grandmaster's Contest of Champions, facing his friend Hulk. Summoning lightning, Thor gets the upper hand, but the Grandmaster sabotages the fight to ensure Hulk's victory. Still enslaved after the fight, Thor attempts to convince Hulk and 142 to help him save Asgard, but neither is willing.

Thor finds the Quinjet that brought Hulk to Sakaar. Hulk inadvertently destroys the Quinjet, but a recording of Natasha Romanoff causes Hulk to transform back into Bruce Banner for the first time since leaving Sokovia. 142 decides to help Thor save Asgard. Loki helps them steal one of the Grandmaster's ships. They liberate the other gladiators who, incited by two aliens named Korg and Miek, stage a revolution. Loki again attempts to betray his brother, but Thor anticipates this and incapacitates him. Thor, Banner, and 142 escape through a wormhole to Asgard, where Hela's forces attack Heimdall and the Asgardian citizens. Hulk defeats Fenris; Loki and the gladiators arrive to help, and a repentant Skurge sacrifices himself to save the citizens.

Thor, battling Hela, loses his right eye and has a vision of Odin that helps him realize only Ragnarök can stop her, as she is too powerful. He sends Loki to trigger Ragnarök by placing Surtur's crown in the Eternal Flame. Surtur is reborn and destroys Asgard, killing Hela. Aboard the Grandmaster's spaceship, the Statesman, Thor, now king, reconciles with Loki and decides to take his people to Earth. In a mid-credits scene, they are intercepted by a large spacecraft. (Note: According to producer Kevin Feige, the spaceship seen in the mid-credits scene is the Sanctuary II, which belongs to Thanos.) In a post-credits scene, the overthrown Grandmaster is confronted by his former subjects.

== Cast ==
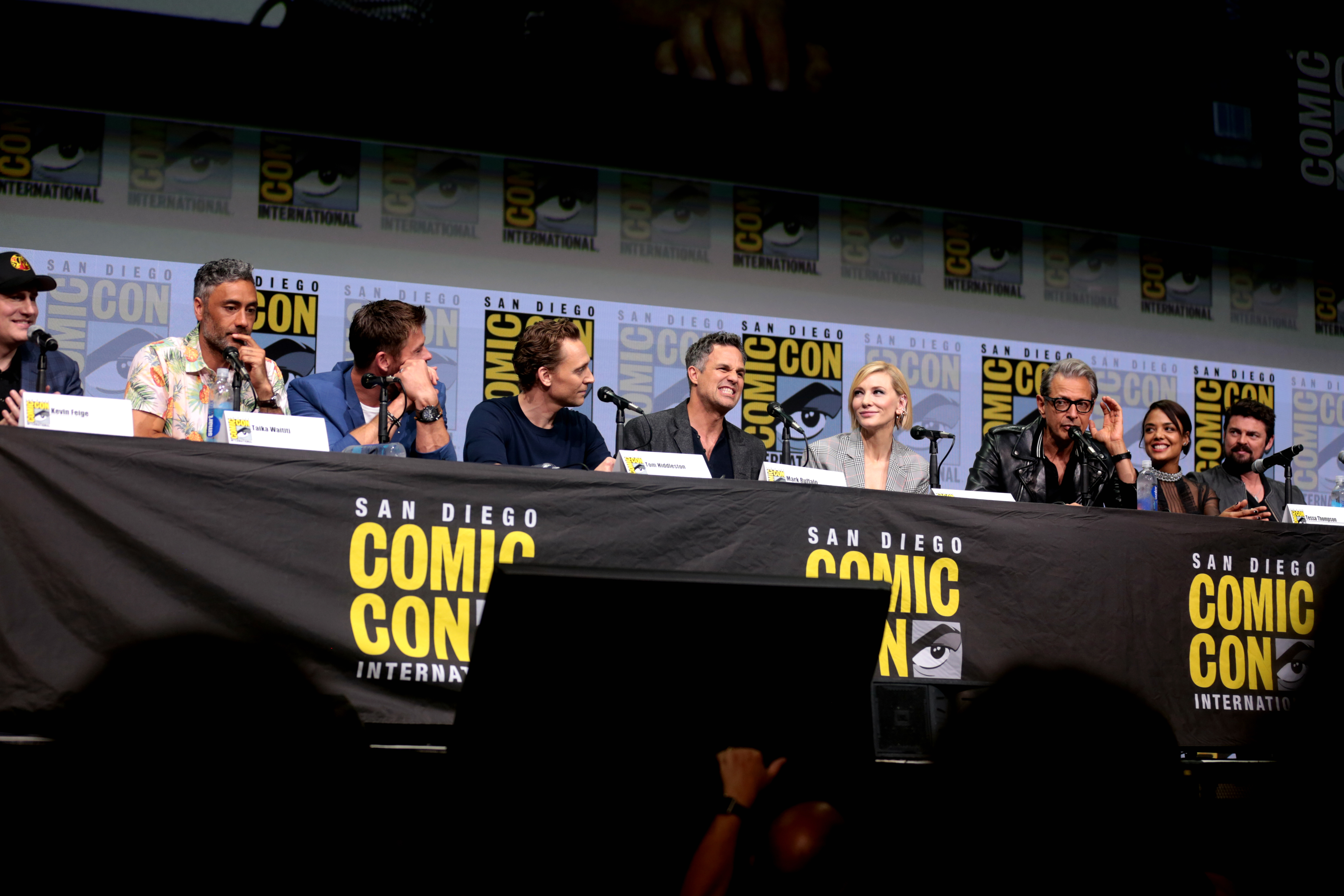
Kevin Feige, Taika Waititi, and the cast of Thor: Ragnarok at the 2017 San Diego Comic-Con

- Chris Hemsworth as Thor:
  An Avenger and the crown prince of Asgard, based on the Norse mythological deity of the same name, who has become a "lone gunslinger" searching for the Infinity Stones. Hemsworth had grown "a bit bored" of Thor after portraying the character four times previously, and wanted to take some risks and experiment: Thor has shorter hair in the film, wears a different outfit, his hammer Mjolnir is destroyed, and he loses an eye. Director Taika Waititi added that "stripping" the character down like this allowed him to become a refugee at the end of the film. Waititi also wanted to use more of Hemsworth's comedic skills showcased in films such as Vacation (2015) and Ghostbusters (2016), and cited Kurt Russell's performance in the film Big Trouble in Little China (1986) as an influence on the character.
- Tom Hiddleston as Loki:
  Thor's adoptive brother and nemesis, based on the deity of the same name. Hiddleston was interested in how Loki's attitude has changed, saying, "he is always a trickster. It is trying to find new ways for him to be mischievous". As the ruler of Asgard since the end of the film Thor: The Dark World (2013), Hiddleston notes that "Loki has devoted most of his efforts to narcissistic self-glorification. Not so much on good governance." He also added that "the idea that Thor might be indifferent to Loki is troubling for him... it's an interesting development."
- Cate Blanchett as Hela:
  Thor's older sister and the goddess of death, based on the deity Hel, who is inadvertently released from prison following Odin's death. Screenwriter Eric Pearson included the idea of Hela being Thor's sister in one of his drafts at the encouragement of executive producer Brad Winderbaum. The decision to make Hela related to Thor, as opposed to only Loki as in the comics and Norse mythology, came from needing more impact with Hela and Thor's final confrontation. By making the change, Pearson felt Hela became "the thing that [represents] what it is to rule Asgard, [Thor's] family, what he's been told, what he hasn't been told." Blanchett was inspired by singer Siouxsie Sioux as well as "punk-rock iconography" of the 1970s and 1980s, notably Siouxsie's "unique, unconventional movement", for Hela's movement and how she "commands the space". Blanchett found it difficult to portray the character in a motion capture suit rather than costume, feeling Hela's headdress is "such a huge part of" the power of the character that she would have liked to wear it on set. Hela's design was taken from the comic Thor: God of Thunder by Jason Aaron, while the character Gorr from that comic, who has the ability "to manifest an infinite number of weapons", inspired a similar ability for Hela. Blanchett worked with stuntwoman Zoë Bell and Hemsworth's personal trainer Luke Zocchi, and studied capoeira for the role.
- Idris Elba as Heimdall:
  The all-seeing, all-hearing Asgardian and former sentry of the Bifröst Bridge, based on the deity of the same name, who has gone into self-imposed exile during Loki's reign. After Hela invades Asgard, he helps to hide its vulnerable citizens. Describing Heimdall's character arc in the film, Winderbaum says, "he's gone from this elder statesmen, the gatekeeper to Asgard, to this badass warrior-wizard character who lives in the hills and kicks a lot of ass throughout the entire film."
- Jeff Goldblum as Grandmaster:
  One of the Elders of the Universe who rules the planet Sakaar, and enjoys manipulating lesser life-forms. Goldblum described the character as "a hedonist, a pleasure-seeker, an enjoyer of life and tastes and smells". He also said that Waititi encouraged improvisation in order for Goldblum to "make [the character his] own". Waititi explained that Grandmaster does not have blue skin in the film as the character does in the comics, because Goldblum had already played a blue-colored character in Earth Girls Are Easy (1988), and because Waititi did not want to detract from Goldblum's personality by concealing his appearance. Grandmaster is the brother of Benicio del Toro's Taneleer Tivan / Collector from the film Guardians of the Galaxy (2014), and producer Kevin Feige expressed interest in seeing the two together in a future film.
- Tessa Thompson as Valkyrie:
  A tough, hard-drinking Asgardian slave trader, based on the mythological being Brynhildr, who was once a legendary Valkyrie warrior and now works for the Grandmaster under the designation "Scrapper 142". Thompson said the various versions of the character from the comics "left us a lot of leeway" in creating the film version. Waititi "wanted to make sure we weren't making a female character that was boring and pretty", and Feige said Marvel wanted to pair Thor with a love interest more his equal than Jane Foster. Co-screenwriters Craig Kyle and Christopher Yost's original draft of the film had more of a romantic relationship between Thor and Valkyrie. When Pearson started working on the film, he moved away from that storyline, instead focusing more on "the mutual respect" between the characters and Valkyrie "dealing with her PTSD. She's someone who's drowning her sorrows in the bottle, and I just thought that was such a cool thing that you don't often see". Thompson stated that the character is bisexual, which she based on the character's comic book relationship with Annabelle Riggs, and convinced Waititi to shoot a glimpse of a woman walking out of Valkyrie's bedroom, which was later cut from the film, as it "distracted" from the scene's exposition. Thompson was inspired by pictures of Linda Hamilton as Sarah Connor in the film Terminator 2: Judgment Day (1991) while training for the role, and worked with dialect coach Andrew Jack to create an Asgardian-sounding accent that was different enough to sound like she had been away from there for a long time. Thompson will appear in future MCU films.
- Karl Urban as Skurge:
  An Asgardian warrior who guards the Bifröst Bridge in Heimdall's absence and chooses to join Hela as her executioner to survive. Urban shaved his head for the role, and worked out to "get into the zone and feel" the part even though his body is hidden under a costume. Urban said Skurge "makes a deal with the devil" and becomes Hela's "henchman. He does the dirty jobs. And that sort of is something he has to—it plays on his conscience."
- Mark Ruffalo as Bruce Banner / Hulk:
  An Avenger and a genius scientist who transforms into a monster when enraged or agitated after being exposed to gamma radiation. In the two years since the film Avengers: Age of Ultron (2015), he has become a successful and popular gladiator on Sakaar and has suppressed the Banner side during those years. He is forming the vocabulary "of a toddler", with the level of Hulk's speech being "a big conversation" between Waititi and Marvel since it was taking into account future appearances for the character: Ragnarok begins an arc for the character that continues in the films Avengers: Infinity War (2018) and Avengers: Endgame (2019). Ruffalo felt Hulk had "a swagger" in the film, and was "much more of a character than the green rage machine" seen in the Avengers films. Waititi provided additional motion capture for the Hulk after Ruffalo had completed his scenes.
- Anthony Hopkins as Odin:
  The king of Asgard, father of Thor and Hela, and adoptive father of Loki, based on the deity of the same name. The character is in exile on Earth, and was originally intended to be a "crazy-looking" hobo on the streets of New York City, but Waititi ultimately felt that this was tragic rather than funny given the character's death during the sequence. The sequence was changed to take place in Norway, to "honor" the character's past and be more authentic to his role as a king of Asgard. Waititi was surprised by the improvisational ability of Hopkins after he was told "to be funny and to really destroy what's come before [with the role] and recreate it."

Additionally, Tadanobu Asano, Ray Stevenson, and Zachary Levi reprise their roles as Hogun, Volstagg, and Fandral, respectively, members of the Warriors Three. Feige called their appearances "noble ends" that served to establish the threat of Hela and the danger she poses to the main characters. Benedict Cumberbatch reprises his role as Dr. Stephen Strange from the film Doctor Strange (2016) in a brief appearance. Rachel House, who has appeared in several of Waititi's films, plays Topaz, the Grandmaster's chief enforcer, while Waititi portrays Korg, a Kronan gladiator who befriends Thor. Waititi provided a motion-capture performance for the character, who is made of rocks, and wanted to do something different by having the character be soft-spoken, ultimately basing Korg's voice on that of Polynesian bouncers, as well as his friend and frequent co-star, Rhys Darby. Waititi also provided the motion-capture performance for the fire demon Surtur, based on the mythological being Surtr, with Clancy Brown voicing the character. Thor and Hulk co-creator Stan Lee makes a cameo appearance as a man on Sakaar who cuts Thor's hair. There are also several cameos in a sequence where Asgardian actors perform a play based on the events of The Dark World: Sam Neill, with whom Waititi previously worked on the film Hunt for the Wilderpeople (2016), plays the Odin actor; Luke Hemsworth, brother of Chris, plays the Thor actor; Matt Damon plays the Loki actor; and Charlotte Nicdao plays the Sif actress. Scarlett Johansson appears as Natasha Romanoff / Black Widow through archival footage from Age of Ultron.

== Production ==
=== Development ===
While promoting the release of the film Thor: The Dark World in October 2013, Chris Hemsworth expressed willingness to portray Thor for as long as "people wanted more", adding that he was contracted for another Thor film and two more Avengers films. Producer Kevin Feige stated that the next Thor would build from elements at the end of The Dark World. In January 2014, Marvel announced that Craig Kyle and Christopher Yost would write the screenplay for a third film, with Feige again producing; the story was being outlined that July. At the end of October 2014, Feige announced that the film would be titled Thor: Ragnarok, with a scheduled release date of July 28, 2017. Hemsworth and Tom Hiddleston were set to return as Thor and Loki, respectively. Hemsworth earned $15 million for the film. Feige added that the film would be "very important" in Phase Three of the Marvel Cinematic Universe (MCU), and also confirmed that, in the context of the film, the word Ragnarok means "the end of all things". He felt that "people will [not] read into that title alone what the movie's going to be".

In February 2015, Marvel pushed back the release date to November 3, 2017. That April, Feige was expecting a draft for the film soon, and a month later he stated that a director, additional screenwriter, and further casting announcements would be revealed "towards the end of the summer", with filming set for June 2016. The Dark World director Alan Taylor explained that he would not be returning, as "the Marvel experience was particularly wrenching because I was sort of given absolute freedom while we were shooting, and then in [post-production] it turned into a different movie. So, that is something I hope never to repeat and don't wish upon anybody else." During the 2015 San Diego Comic-Con, Jaimie Alexander said that she would reprise her role as Sif in "a very pivotal part" of the film.

I think the overall sense that I'm trying to give to the audience and what I want the audience to leave the cinema carrying with them is a sense of joy really... Sometimes I would stop and think, I'm doing a movie that's got Thor and Doctor Strange and the Incredible Hulk and Loki and every character is so strange and different... Civil War it's just humans, humans with human problems. Ours is creatures and beings and all these sorts of really different characters.

— Taika Waititi, director of Thor: Ragnarok

By October 2015, Taika Waititi had entered negotiations to direct Ragnarok. Other directors under consideration included Ruben Fleischer, Rob Letterman, and Rawson Marshall Thurber. Elizabeth Banks had expressed interest in presenting a pitch for the film, but never ultimately met with Marvel to do so. Marvel presented the prospective directors with "the ten different ideas that we had for the movie", asking them all to come back with a clearer picture of what the film should be. Waititi created "a sizzle reel for the tone, and some joke stuff" using clips from other films, including Big Trouble in Little China (1986). Despite being a discouraged practice within the company, Marvel considered Waititi's reel to be "amazing", particularly its use of Led Zeppelin's "Immigrant Song" for the score, which Feige felt "defined what Taika was going to do with this". The song was later used in the film itself, and for marketing it. On why he decided to pursue directing the film, after stating in 2012 that he had no interest in "big features, where the art of the project was sacrificed for profit", Waititi said he felt "like a guest in Marvel's universe but with the creative freedom to do what I want". Waititi was confirmed as director of the film by multiple news outlets later in October.

In the same month, Mark Ruffalo was also finalizing a deal to reprise his role as Bruce Banner / Hulk from previous MCU films, which was confirmed shortly after. Hulk was last seen at the end of the MCU film Avengers: Age of Ultron (2015) traveling in a Quinjet, which was originally planned to be shown flying near Saturn. Feige explained that this was changed to an Earth-based location to leave Hulk's fate ambiguous and dispel rumors that a film based on the 2006 comic storyline "Planet Hulk" was in development, since Marvel Studios had no plans to adapt the storyline at the time. According to executive producer Brad Winderbaum, the idea to include Hulk in Ragnarok came early on in development, when the production team looked at the "Planet Hulk" storyline and felt it was a "no brainer" to integrate Hulk into the Thor franchise, exploring "the idea of a planet where there's gladiatorial games as a Thor predicament. [That storyline] was a really cool idea to us." Feige further explained that initial discussions had focused on doing "something totally different with Thor", and that centered on continuing the relationship with Loki and ideas for Hela, Valkyrie, Balder the Brave, and Beta Ray Bill, "but we were like, 'We need something big.'" This turned to discussing Thor going to space, and jokingly calling it "Planet Thor", which led to including Hulk in the film and revealing that he ultimately went to space at the end of Age of Ultron.

Also in October, Australia's Minister for Foreign Affairs Julie Bishop announced that filming would take place in the country, exclusively throughout the state of Queensland, including at Village Roadshow Studios in Oxenford, Gold Coast. According to Premier Annastacia Palaszczuk, the production was to spend over $100 million in Queensland and employ 750 Queenslanders. Hemsworth had asked Marvel to produce the film in his home country of Australia. At the end of November 2015, Stellan Skarsgård, who portrayed Erik Selvig in the previous Thor films, said that he was contracted to appear should Marvel want to include him, but he was uncertain at the time if they did. He later confirmed that he would not appear in Ragnarok. The next month, Stephany Folsom was hired to work on the script and Cate Blanchett entered final negotiations to join the cast.

=== Pre-production ===
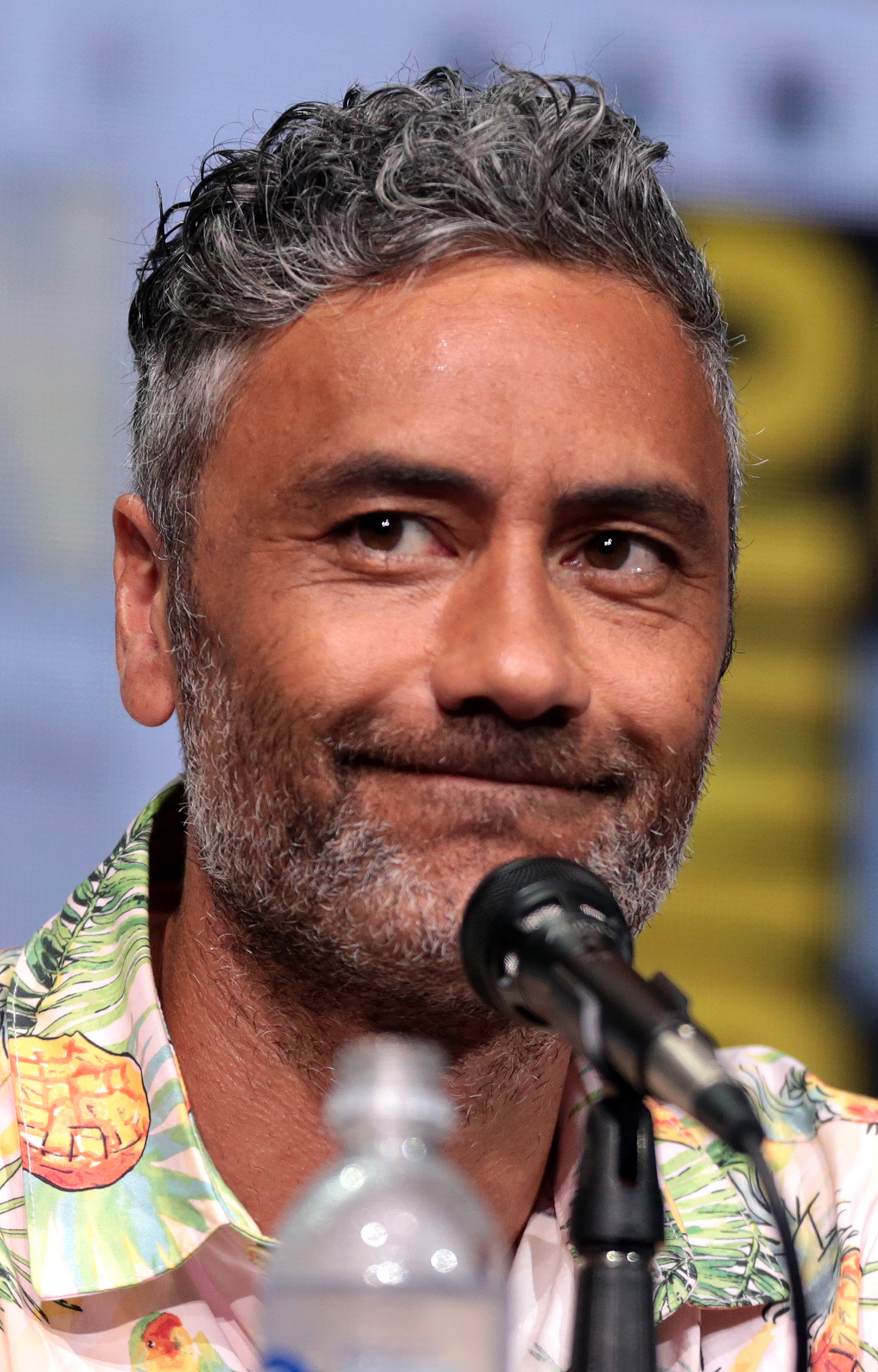
Waititi at the 2017 San Diego Comic-Con

In January 2016, with the film beginning pre-production, Ruffalo described it as a "road movie" and indicated that additional filming would take place in Sydney. Waititi stated that he was working on the script "a little bit", mainly adding humor to the screenplay, with Eric Pearson joining the project to rewrite the screenplay. Pearson felt joining presented many challenges, as "there were so many puzzle pieces already there," such as having Blanchett as Hela, who was confirmed in the role a month later, and including Hulk, Valkyrie, and Skurge, that he was asked to assemble. Pearson was told not to be restrained by anything from the previous films, and Waititi asked him to make the film fun and have Thor "be the coolest character". Alexander said in early March that she was no longer sure if she would appear in the film, due to scheduling conflicts with her television series Blindspot (2015–2020). She later indicated that this may not be the case, but ultimately was unable to appear in the film due to the conflict. Sif does appear as a character in the play based on the events of The Dark World, portrayed by Charlotte Nicdao.

In April, Tessa Thompson was cast as Valkyrie, with Natalie Portman not returning from the previous films as love interest Jane Foster. Marvel never asked the screenwriters to include the Earth-based characters from the previous films, and Feige said that Foster and Thor have broken up between films. In May, Marvel confirmed Blanchett and Thompson for the film, announced the casting of Jeff Goldblum as Grandmaster and Karl Urban as Skurge, and revealed that Idris Elba and Anthony Hopkins would reprise their respective roles of Heimdall and Odin from the previous films. In early June, Palaszczuk and Marvel Studios executive David Grant announced that filming would begin on July 4, 2016, with Weta Workshop creating props for the film. Before the sets for the MCU film Doctor Strange (2016) were demolished, Waititi wrote and filmed a scene for Ragnarok where Thor meets Benedict Cumberbatch's Stephen Strange. Marvel and Doctor Strange director Scott Derrickson felt the scene was "kind of perfect" to show Strange joining the wider MCU, so the scene also appears during the credits of Doctor Strange.

Feige noted that Ragnarok would primarily take place in the "cosmos" rather than on Earth, a departure from the previous Thor films. He expanded by saying, "Tonally and geographically there are a lot of different planets outside of the nine realms that we visit" in the film. Waititi consulted with theoretical physicist Clifford Johnson on space travel. Johnson viewed early drafts of the script, and gave Waititi physics ideas that could "wink at some of the classic old [Thor] stuff"; Johnson previously consulted on the second season of the MCU television series Agent Carter (2015–2016). Astronomer-physicist Adam Frank was also a consultant on the film, advising on wormholes and interstellar travel. Comic artist and Thor co-creator Jack Kirby was one of Waititi's major visual inspirations for the film. Winderbaum also called Walt Simonson's "Ragnarok" story arc an inspiration for "really fun elements ... both stylistically and narratively", as well as Thor: God of Thunder (2012–2014) by Jason Aaron, which was the inspiration for Hela's design and abilities. Waititi said the planet Sakaar, which is featured in the "Planet Hulk" storyline, was "the biggest shift for the film and these characters", with Winderbaum describing it as "the toilet of the universe", surrounded by "wormholes that have been spitting things out into this place for eons". Also featured is Muspelheim, one of the Nine Realms, ruled by Surtur. Production designer Dan Hennah described it as a Dyson sphere, with the realm drawing power out of a dying star to energize its inhabitants. Hennah hoped to give Asgard "more of a humanity" than in previous films, by adding smaller building perspectives to help the realm seem more practical and utilitarian. For Saakar's gladiator arena, Hennah looked at Roman gladiators, but differentiated from previous similar ideas by going "all alien with it". The arena is surrounded by "standing up bleachers".

Waititi said that the film would reinvent the franchise, as "a lot of what we're doing with the film is, in a way, kind of dismantling and destroying the old idea and rebuilding it in a new way that's fresh. Everyone's got a slightly new take on their characters, so in that way, it feels like [this is] the first Thor (2011)." He added that he had seen the other films and respected them, but wanted to focus on making a "standalone film because this could be the only time I do this. I just want to make it [my] version of a Marvel film in the best way possible." This is something Hemsworth had hoped for, looking to have a lighter tone in Ragnarok compared to the previous Thor films, especially the second one, similar to Guardians of the Galaxy (2014). He said, "I feel we had less of the sort of the naivety or fun or humor that the first [Thor] might have had. I wish we had more of that in the second [movie] ... We've done regal. We've done Shakespeare, and we've shown that. I think now it's time to go, 'Ok, cool. Let's try something different.'" Hemsworth continued that in order to prevent the character or film from becoming "predictable", there was "definitely a goal to do something unexpected...I think we want to get back to more of a sense of adventure and fun".

The events of Ragnarok are set four years after the events of The Dark World, two years after the events of Age of Ultron, and around the same time as the events of the films Captain America: Civil War (2016) and Spider-Man: Homecoming (2017), with Winderbaum noting that "things happen on top of each other now in Phase Three". The events of Ragnarok also set up the MCU film Avengers: Infinity War (2018), and Hemsworth spoke to Infinity War directors Anthony and Joe Russo before receiving the script for Ragnarok to see how it would link to Infinity War. He said Ragnarok "definitely bleeds nicely into those [films]", and Winderbaum likened Ragnarok's impact on the larger MCU to that of the film Captain America: The Winter Soldier (2014), saying it would break down ideas regarding Asgard that were previously established similar "to how Winter Soldier broke down S.H.I.E.L.D."

=== Filming ===
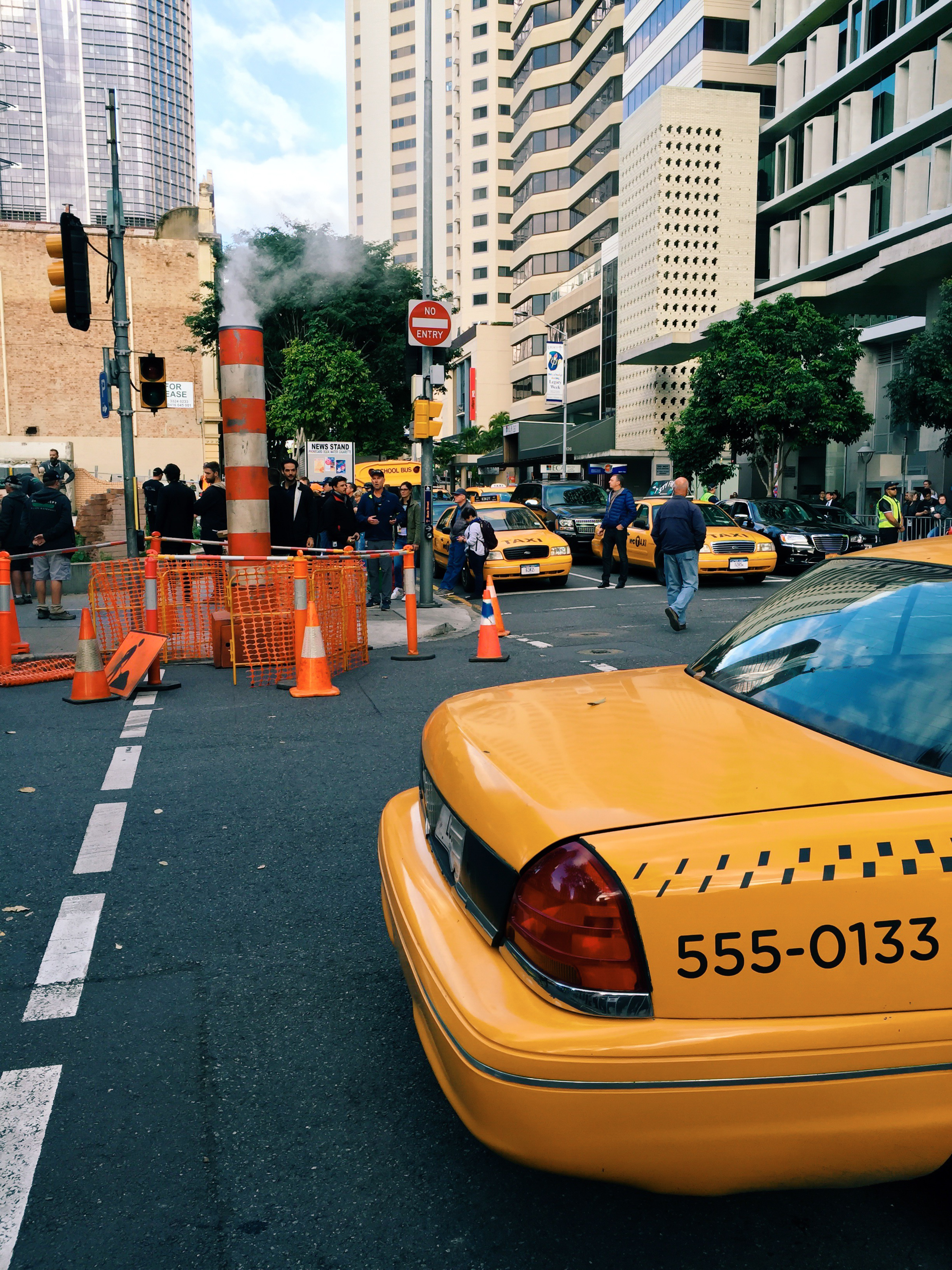
Filming of Thor: Ragnarok in Brisbane's central business district, which doubled as Manhattan

Principal photography began on July 4, 2016, under the working title Creature Report, at Village Roadshow Studios in Oxenford, Gold Coast, Queensland, Australia, exclusively using all nine of the studios' sound stages. Additional filming was to occur throughout the state of Queensland, including Tamborine National Park. The Brisbane central business district, where filming took place from August 22 to 25, was used to double as New York City. Javier Aguirresarobe served as cinematographer on the film, describing his work on the film as "a rare combination of satisfaction and frustration", feeling that he was mostly there to service the director and visual effects supervisor, but felt "very happy to have been able to respond to such incredible technical requirements".

Later in July, regarding the film's "buddy-style comedy" nature, Waititi said that the script had changed from then and it was still unclear what the final film would look like, but there "are buddy elements to it between Thor and the Hulk". He said it would be a "'70s/'80s sci-fi fantasy" and "the most 'out there' of all the Marvel movies", with the tone closest to that of Big Trouble in Little China. Inspiration for the road-trip aspect of Ragnarok included the films 48 Hrs. (1982), Withnail and I (1987), and Planes, Trains and Automobiles (1987). Waititi also asked the heads of each department to watch the film Flash Gordon (1980) before beginning work. Concept art released at San Diego Comic Con in 2016 revealed that the character Fenris Wolf would appear.

By August, over 100 set and construction workers were given termination notifications, with some complaining that they had been promised work until October or November 2016, and that New Zealand crew members were receiving preferential treatment over the Australian locals. However, Premier Palaszczuk stated that the work for set builders simply "finished", and that other jobs would become available as actors arrived for filming. Sets constructed for the film were for Sakaar, including the Grandmaster's palace and surrounding junkyard, as well as Asgard (based on the aesthetics of the previous Thor films). The interior of the Avenger Quinjet, which was built for the MCU film The Avengers (2012), was shipped to Australia. Waititi, who is Māori, made hiring Indigenous and Aboriginal Australians, along with New Zealanders, a priority for the various departments, saying, "It's a responsibility you have to the Indigenous people. You're coming to a country and you're bringing money into the economy and creating jobs but I think you have an even bigger responsibility to look after the people that have less opportunities." He added that having these people on the crew "feel[s] very much like family" and "helps calm me down and makes me feel relaxed". The Indigenous and Aboriginals were hired as part of an initiative by Screen Australia's Indigenous Department, whose mission is "to give Aboriginal and Torres Strait Islanders a foot in the door of the film industry".

In mid-September 2016, concept art seen during a set visit indicated Midgard Serpent would appear, and that Sif and the Warriors Three, allies of Thor in the previous two films, would be addressed in Ragnarok. Towards the end of the month, Sam Neill, who worked with Waititi in the film Hunt for the Wilderpeople (2016), revealed he had a role in the film. Shortly after, Waititi teased the inclusion of the characters Korg, who Waititi portrays through motion-capture, and Miek, who is not portrayed by an actor as he does not speak in the film, and is depicted as "a larva-like creature... [with] cybernetic legs and arms". In mid-October, Waititi revealed that new camera technology had been used for a shot in the film, and that he had hoped to include John C. Reilly's Nova Corpsman Rhomann Dey from Guardians of the Galaxy in the film, but there was "no real way to pull it off". Principal photography wrapped on October 28, 2016. Second unit filming took place on Dirk Hartog Island off the coast of Western Australia, and in the South Island of New Zealand. According to Waititi, 80 percent of the dialogue in Ragnarok was improvised, in order to create a "very loose and collaborate mood" among the cast, and as an attempt to replicate the tone and sensibility from his previous films. He stated, "My style of working is I'll often be behind the camera, or right next to the camera yelling words at people, like, 'Say this, say this! Say it this way!'"

=== Post-production ===
In January 2017, it was revealed that Pearson would receive sole screenwriting credit on the film, with the story credited to Kyle, Yost, and Folsom. These credits were later updated the following September, with Pearson as the screenwriter and story credit for Kyle and Yost. Folsom took issue with Marvel marketing the film with these credits, noting the Writers Guild of America (WGA) had yet to determine the final credits for the film. She later said that Marvel had given her a story credit on the film, but it was denied by the WGA due to their regulation that a maximum of two individuals can receive story credit, with an allowance for a writing team to count as one individual; Pearson and the team of Kyle and Yost received the story credit on Ragnarok. Folsom added that she planned to appeal the decision and that Marvel has been supportive of her throughout her attempt to receive credit. By the end of the month, the writing credits were updated once again, this time simply crediting Pearson, Kyle, and Yost as screenwriters.

In February 2017, Rachel House said she had a small role in the film, having worked with Waititi before. Additional filming took place in Atlanta in July 2017, over three weeks, including filming post-credit scenes. One of these introduces the spaceship Sanctuary II, which belongs to Thanos in Avengers: Infinity War, while the other, shown at the end of the credits, features the Grandmaster. Goldblum and Waititi improvised multiple versions of the latter scene; one unused version involved the singing of the Sakaarian national anthem, which was "made up on the spot". Also filmed in Atlanta was the completion of a sequence where Asgardian actors perform a play based on the events of The Dark World. Neill appears in the sequence as the Odin actor, and Hemsworth's brother Luke portrays the Thor actor. Explaining the sequence, Waititi said, "if I was Loki and I was ruling Asgard, I would write a play about myself and force everyone to go and see it—change the details of the play and get a huge celebrity to play myself." For the Loki actor, they "really wanted someone good and someone who's funny", and Chris Hemsworth suggested that Matt Damon, whom he knew personally, take on the role. Damon was in New York City at the time, and flew to Atlanta just to shoot the cameo "on a lark". Also changed during reshoots was the location of the sequence where Thor and Loki find Odin on Earth, and Hela subsequently destroys Mjolnir. Originally set in a New York City alley, Waititi decided that the environment was distracting from the emotions of the sequence. The location was changed to Norway, which Waititi felt gave more weight to the scenes, made Odin's storyline more "authentic", and also allowed the characters and the audience to "chill out for a second, and have that moment, because the rest of the film basically just runs at a clip".

By the time the reshoots for the film were completed, the film had been cut down from Waititi's initial version of two hours and forty minutes to around ninety minutes, with that expected to increase slightly with the newly filmed scenes. However, after the film's 2017 Comic Con panel, it was decided to add back a lot of the jokes that had been removed, with the final runtime being two hours and ten minutes. Joel Negron and Zene Baker served as editors on the film. Waititi described the process of deciding exactly what jokes to keep as "very tricky ... sometimes it would be funny in the beginning of the film and then not funny at all [or] it was funny in the wrong places and in the end, we had to just keep testing jokes and testing parts of the film". Ragnarok also clarifies that an Infinity Gauntlet seen in Thor was a fake. Feige expanded, saying that it had been included in Thor as an easter egg, since Marvel Studios was "working on The Avengers and trying to [put] that all together for the conclusion of Phase One". However, shortly after The Avengers released and the studio began to solidify plans for Infinity War, they realized that the gauntlet seen in Thor could not be the actual one, creating an internal theory that it was fake; this resulted in the scene in Ragnarok, which was created "just [to have] the opportunity to call it a fake".

==== Visual effects ====
Original (top) and effects (bottom) shots of the Valkyrie flashback sequence in Thor: Ragnarok

External videos
- Marvel Studios' Thor: Ragnarok End Credits Main on End Title Sequence Design presents the film's main-on-end title sequence, YouTube video from Perception's channel

Visual effects for the film were created by Industrial Light & Magic's (ILM) San Francisco and Vancouver studios, with help from Base FX, Animatrik, and Virtuos; Framestore; Method Studios Vancouver; Digital Domain; Rising Sun Pictures; Luma Pictures; D Negative; Iloura; Image Engine; Trixter; The Secret Lab; WhiskyTree Inc; Fin Designs + Effects; and Perception. Previsualization work was provided by The Third Floor and Day for Nite. Luma Pictures produced over 200 shoots in eight sequences, particularly for the characters Korg (receiving assets from Framestore) and Miek. Method Studios provided over 450 shots, including Thor's opening fight against Surtur in Muspelheim and Hela's fight against the Asgardian guards. D Negative worked on over 190 shots, creating the environment for the planet Sakaar, including its junkyard landscape and wormholes, with the wormholes also created through a collaboration with Digital Domain. The film's main-on-end title sequence was designed by Perception.

ILM, who worked on previous incarnations of the Hulk, had to add much more detail to the character's facial features in Ragnarok due to the Hulk's increased dialogue. ILM visual effects supervisor Chad Wiebe explained that Ruffalo's expressions were captured fresh for the film using Medusa, a performance capture technology. With 90 different expressions captured, ILM "built an entirely new library that would allow [Hulk] to cover a full range of normal human visual characteristics". To help create the Hulk, a person on set was covered in green body paint, and would replicate the intended motions of the character to aid the visual effect artists. Additionally, stunt actor Paul Lowe, who is under 5 feet (1.52 m) tall, stood in for Hemsworth during some of his interactions with the Hulk so that the Hulk's stuntmen would be proportionally correct. In some instances when Thor and the Hulk interacted, a digital double was used for Thor, also created by ILM, to have greater flexibility for the shots. ILM worked on all of the Hulk moments in the film outside the final fight sequence, which was completed by Framestore using ILM's assets, as Framestore was primarily responsible for rigging that sequence. Framestore completed nearly 460 shots, which featured digital doubles of Thor and Hela, Fenris, Korg, Miek, the giant Surtur at the end of the film, and over 9,000 buildings for Asgard, based on assets D Negative had from The Dark World, resulting in over 263 character, vehicle, prop, and crowd rigs.

Rising Sun Pictures produced more than 170 visual effects shots for Ragnarok. They worked on the Valkyrie flashback sequence, with the sequence's surreal ethereal appearance achieved through a combination of motion capture, computer graphics, a 900 fps high-speed frame rate, and a special 360-degree lighting rig containing 200 strobe lights to bathe the scene in undulating patterns of light and shadow. Rising Sun also helped create the various CGI aspects of Hela, such as her "hair wipe transition" to her horns, and her original introduction in New York City. Following the reshoots, ImageEngine completed the new Norway introduction since Rising Sun was focused on the palace fight by then.

== Music ==
By August 2016, Mark Mothersbaugh was hired to score the film. The synthesized score is influenced by the work of Jean-Michel Jarre. Waititi stated he would have asked the band Queen to work on the soundtrack for the film if their lead singer Freddie Mercury was still alive, because the film is "a cool, bold, colorful cosmic adventure" which would have suited the "feel" of the band. Additional music featured in the film include "Immigrant Song" by Led Zeppelin and "Pure Imagination" from the film Willy Wonka & the Chocolate Factory (1971). Patrick Doyle's themes from Thor and Brian Tyler's themes from The Dark World and Age of Ultron, as well as Joe Harnell's "The Lonely Man" theme from the television series The Incredible Hulk (1977–1982), are also used in the film. Hollywood Records released the film's soundtrack digitally on October 20, 2017, and physically on November 10, 2017.

== Marketing ==
At the 2016 San Diego Comic-Con, a physical model of Hulk's gladiator armor was revealed, concept art and rough animatics were shown, and a "mockumentary" short titled Team Thor was screened. Directed by Waititi, it showed what Thor and Banner were doing during the events of Civil War, with Daley Pearson appearing as Thor's Australian flatmate Darryl Jacobson. The short was released online in August 2016, and with the digital download of Captain America: Civil War the following month. Team Thor: Part 2 was released on the home media of Doctor Strange in February 2017, with Pearson reprising his role. Footage and concept art for the film were shown at CinemaCon 2017.

On April 10, 2017, the first teaser trailer was released. Sandy Schaefer of Screen Rant felt it was "a strong start" for the film, having "a distinctly playful vibe" by setting it to "Immigrant Song". The Verge's Chaim Gartenberg said "this may be the weirdest Marvel movie to date" thanks to the costumes, makeup, and '80s aesthetic. Michael Arbeiter for Nerdist was pleased with the teaser, stating, "nothing in the MCU thus far can hold a candle to the imagination promised by this ... have any of [the previous MCU films] felt this beholden to what we've always known and loved as the adventure genre?" The teaser was viewed 136 million times in 24 hours, the third-highest in that time frame, behind The Fate of the Furious (139 million) and It (197 million). It also became Disney and Marvel's most viewed trailer within that time period, surpassing Beauty and the Beast (127 million) and Captain America: Civil War (94 million), respectively. The line from the trailer of Thor saying Hulk "is a friend from work" was suggested to Hemsworth by a Make-A-Wish child visiting the set on the day the scene was filmed.

Props and costumes from the film were on display at D23 Expo 2017 along with set pieces for photo opportunities. The costumes were also on display at the 2017 San Diego Comic-Con, where Waititi and cast members promoted the film. Exclusive clips were shown, along with a new trailer. Ethan Anderton of /Film felt "the blend of comedy and bright, vibrant comic book action" in the trailer was "incredible". Collider's Haleigh Foutch was "in love with this trailer" and "all in" on the film. Germain Lussier for io9 called the trailer "a two-and-a-half-minute ball of action, awesomeness, humor, and insanity that may be the most purely fun Marvel movie trailer we've ever seen." The poster also released was praised, being called by Anthony Couto from Comic Book Resources as "quite stunning", "insanely colorful", and "perfectly symmetrical", with Matt Goldberg of Collider feeling it "really [lets] you know that this Thor movie is going to be radically different than the first two". Due to the Comic-Con presentation, Thor: Ragnarok generated over 264,000 new conversations on social media from July 17 to 23, the most out of any film during that time period, according to Comscore and its PreAct service. It remained the most-discussed film on social media for two more weeks.

In August 2017, Marvel partnered with car manufacturer Renault on a commercial supporting the release of the Kwid in Brazil. Directed by Jonathan Gurvit and shot in São Paulo, it features the Hulk destroying a satellite headed towards the city. Framestore worked on visual effects for the commercial, building on the foundation they had from working on the character in previous films. Also in August, Marvel, in partnership with Dolby Laboratories, Synchrony Bank, American Association for the Advancement of Science (AAAS), Broadcom Masters, and Society for Science & the Public, announced the "Superpower of STEM Challenge", aimed at females aged 15 through 18 in STEM (Science, Technology, Engineering, and Mathematics education) fields, to "create an original Do-It-Yourself project that can be replicated by others" and "help their family, community or the world be safer, healthier or happier". Five winners would attend the film's world premiere, receive a tour of Walt Disney Studios, and a $500 saving account from Synchrony Bank, with one grand prize winner attending "an immersive three-day mentorship in New York City with Disney Imagineering" to create a "professional-level video teaching other young people how to recreate" their winning project. They were also given the opportunity to demonstrate the project on the television program Good Morning America.

For the week of August 21, Ragnarok once again had the most social media conversations, according to comScore and its PreAct service. New clips of Thor and Hulk fighting, released on the same day as the Floyd Mayweather Jr. vs. Conor McGregor fight, helped generate the 57,000 new conversations for the week. From September 25 to October 15, Ragnarok had the second-most social media conversations according to the service, and was once again first for the week of October 16 following the release of extended clips and plot details. Beginning October 6, 2017, Disney California Adventure showed a sneak peek of the film at the Sunset Showcase Theater in Hollywood Land, presented in 3D with "special in-theater effects". Ahead of the United States release of the film, Hemsworth, Hiddleston, Blanchett, Goldblum, Ruffalo, and Thompson appeared with James Corden on the late-night talk show The Late Late Show with James Corden (2015–2023) to present a "4D" version of the film, which was actually a stage play. The cast performed various scenes from the film live in low-budget costumes and with cardboard stage props. Additional promotional partners of the film included Red Robin, UnitedHealthcare, and Screenvision Media.

== Release ==
=== Theatrical ===
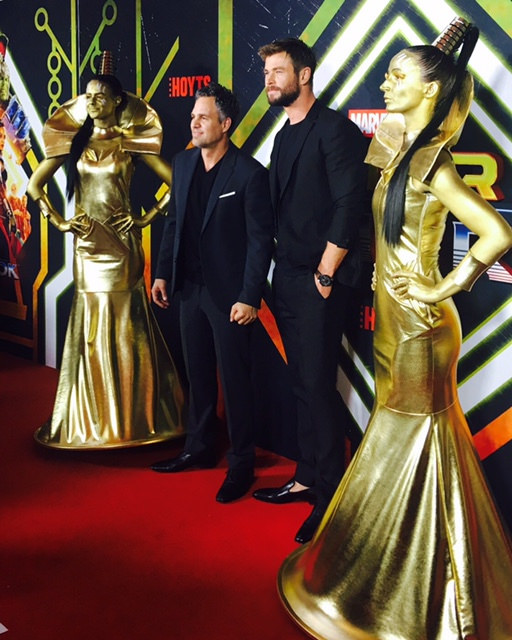
Mark Ruffalo (center left) and Chris Hemsworth (center right) at the Sydney premiere of Thor: Ragnarok

Thor: Ragnarok had its world premiere at the El Capitan Theatre in Hollywood, Los Angeles, on October 10, 2017, and its Australian premiere took place on October 13, on the Gold Coast. It was released in the United Kingdom on October 24, 2017, with additional international releases on October 25, and in Australia on October 26. The film was released in the United States and Canada on November 3, in 4,080 theaters, of which over 3,400 were 3D, 381 were IMAX and IMAX 3D, and 204 were D-Box. The film opened in 1,187 IMAX theaters globally, which was a November opening weekend record. It was originally scheduled for release on July 28, 2017. Thor: Ragnarok is part of Phase Three of the MCU.

=== Home media ===
Thor: Ragnarok was released on digital download by Walt Disney Studios Home Entertainment on February 20, 2018, and on Ultra HD Blu-ray, Blu-ray, DVD and On-Demand on March 6. The digital and Blu-ray releases include behind-the-scenes featurettes; audio commentary; deleted scenes; a blooper reel; and Team Darryl, a continuation of the "mockumentary" short films Team Thor and Team Thor: Part 2, in which the Grandmaster moves in with Darryl after Thor leaves. In one of the deleted scenes, Michael Rooker makes an appearance as Yondu, reprising the role from the first two Guardians of the Galaxy films. James Gunn, writer and director of the Guardians films, clarified that Yondu was never meant to appear in the final film, and that Rooker was on a nearby set recording material for the Halloween variant of the theme park attraction Guardians of the Galaxy – Mission: Breakout!; and decided to stop by the Ragnarok set "to goof around".

The film debuted at number one on the NPD VideoScan overall disc sales chart during its first week of release, which tracks combined DVD and Blu-ray Disc unit sales, and a dedicated Blu-ray Disc sales chart. Blu-ray accounted for 83% of unit sales, with 11% coming from Ultra HD Blu-ray. Thor: Ragnarok also debuted second on the Media Play News rental chart behind Coco. In its second week, the film fell to number two on the NPD VideoScan chart, coming in behind Justice League, but rose to number one on the Media Play News rental chart. The IMAX Enhanced version of the film was made available on Disney+ beginning on November 12, 2021.

== Reception ==
=== Box office ===
Thor: Ragnarok grossed $316 million in the United States and Canada, and $539 million in other territories, for a worldwide total of $855 million. In September 2017, a survey from Fandango indicated that Ragnarok was the most anticipated fall film. On the weekend of November 3, 2017, the film earned $25.4 million from IMAX showings, surpassing Doctor Strange as the largest for a November weekend. The film had earned $650.1 million globally, surpassing the total grosses for Thor ($449.3 million) and Thor: The Dark World ($644.6 million), by the end of its third weekend. It became the ninth-highest-grossing film of 2017. Deadline Hollywood calculated the film's net profit as $174.2 million, accounting for production budgets, marketing, talent participations, and other costs; box office grosses and home media revenues placed it eighth on their list of 2017's "Most Valuable Blockbusters".

Thor: Ragnarok earned $46.8 million on its opening day in the United States and Canada (including $14.5 million from Thursday night previews), and had a total weekend gross of $122.7 million, which was the top film for the weekend, the sixth-best November opening, and the largest opening for all Thor films. IMAX contributed $12.2 million, which was the second-best IMAX opening of 2017 and its third-best November opening. The film's earnings on Sunday ($32.1 million), was the second-best Sunday in November after The Hunger Games: Catching Fire (2013) ($34.5 million). The film had been projected to gross $100–125 million in its opening weekend. Ragnarok remained the number one film in its second weekend, having earned a total of $211.6 million, which surpassed the entire runs of Thor ($181 million) and The Dark World ($206.4 million). In its third weekend, Thor: Ragnarok fell to third at the box office, and fourth in its fourth and fifth weekends. The film surpassed its projected total domestic gross of $280 million in its fifth weekend with $291.4 million, Thor: Ragnarok was fifth in its sixth weekend, and seventh in its seventh weekend, the final weekend it remained in the top 10.

Outside the United States and Canada, the film opened in 36 markets in its first weekend, ranking first in all, and earning $109.1 million, $6 million of which came from 189 IMAX screens. The United Kingdom opening ($16.2 million) was the best October opening for a non-James Bond film. South Korea ($15.7 million), Australia ($8.4 million), Brazil ($8.1 million), Indonesia ($5.5 million), Taiwan ($5.4 million), the Philippines ($3.8 million), Malaysia ($3.5 million), New Zealand, Vietnam, Argentina, Colombia, Chile, Bosnia, Bulgaria, Croatia, and South Africa had the best October opening weekend ever, while France ($7.7 million) had the second-best. Brazil also had the third-best debut for an MCU film, while New Zealand's opening was the biggest of 2017. In its second weekend, Ragnarok opened at number one in 19 more markets, with the largest November opening ever in China ($56.3 million, including $6 million from 446 IMAX screens), Mexico ($10.8 million), Germany ($8.9 million), and India ($5.5 million). It also remained at number one in many existing markets. The film earned an additional $13.2 million from 788 IMAX screens, the best November opening. In its third weekend, the film remained at number one in over 30 countries, and became the highest-grossing superhero film in the Czech Republic. By its fifth weekend, Ragnarok had become the highest-grossing superhero film in central and eastern Europe. As of December 10, 2017, the film's largest markets were China ($112 million), the United Kingdom ($40.4 million), and South Korea ($35.1 million).

=== Critical response ===
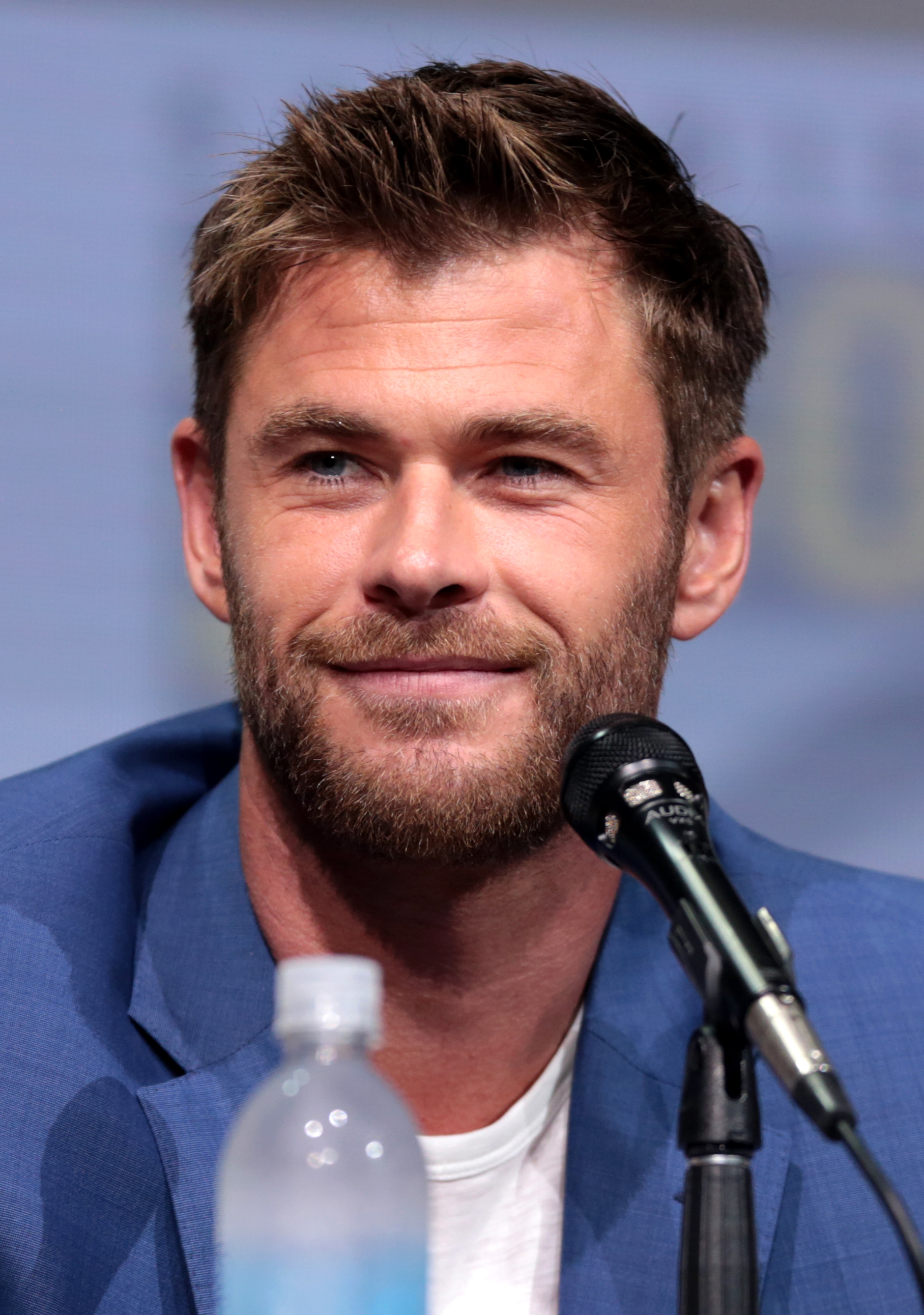
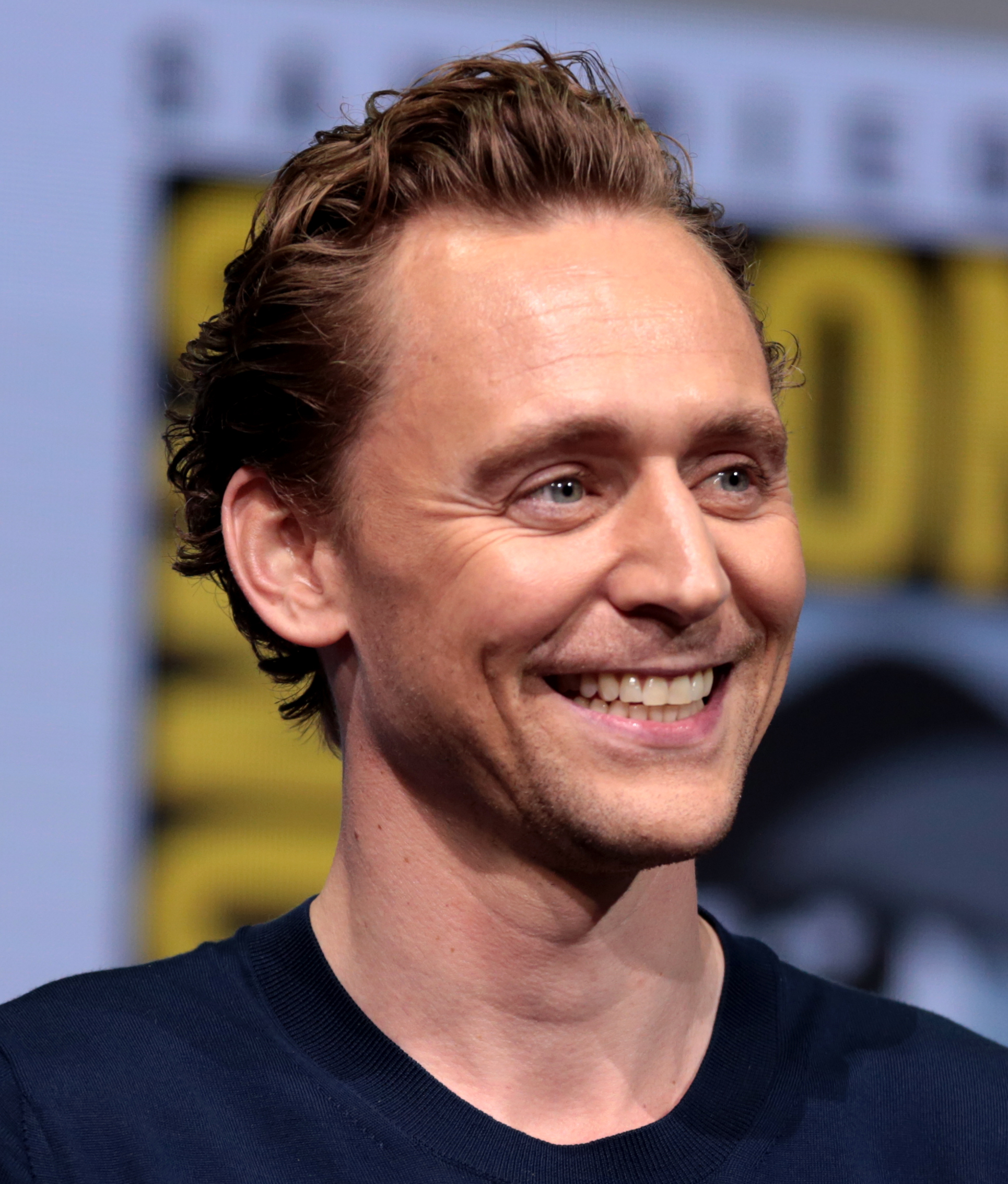
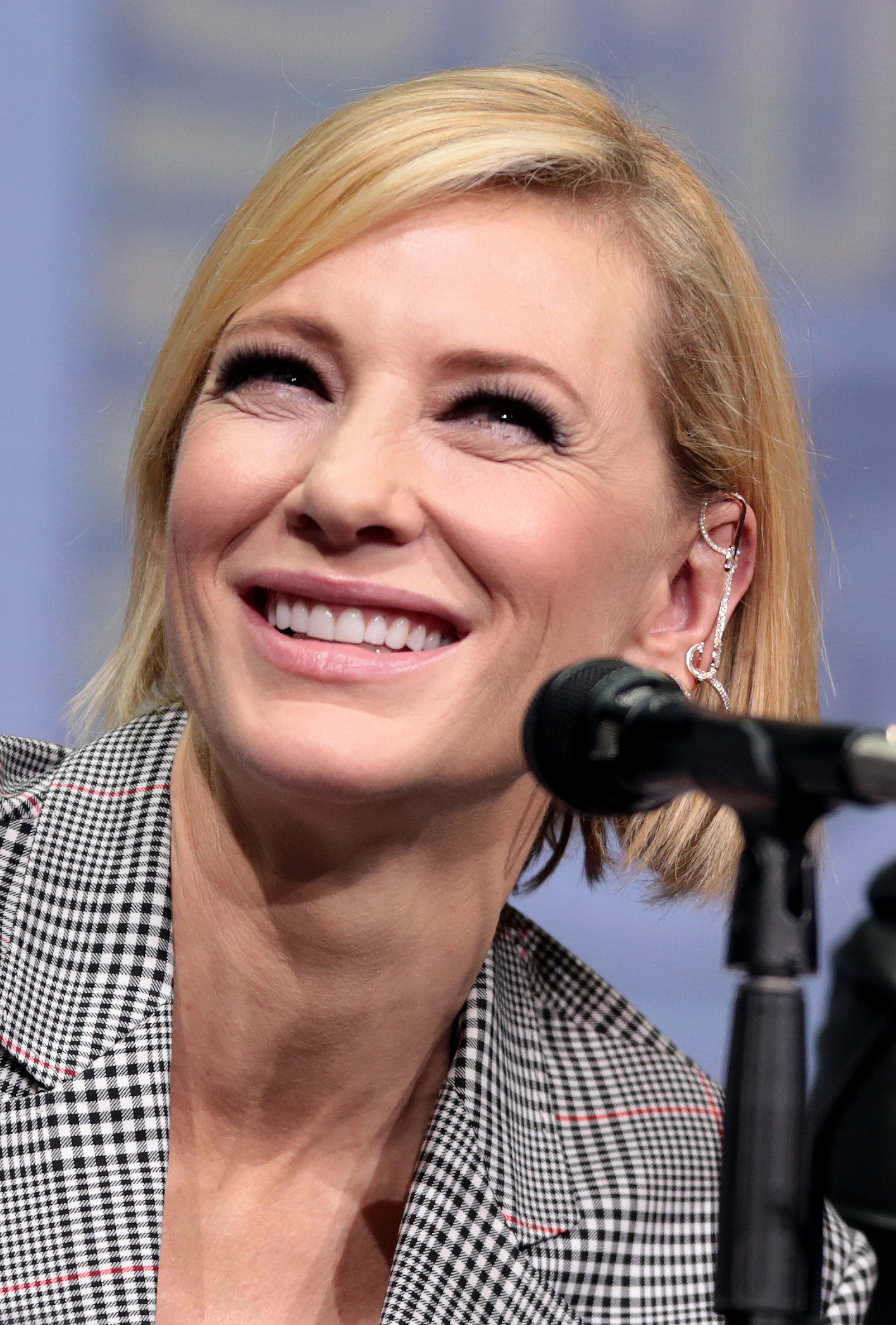
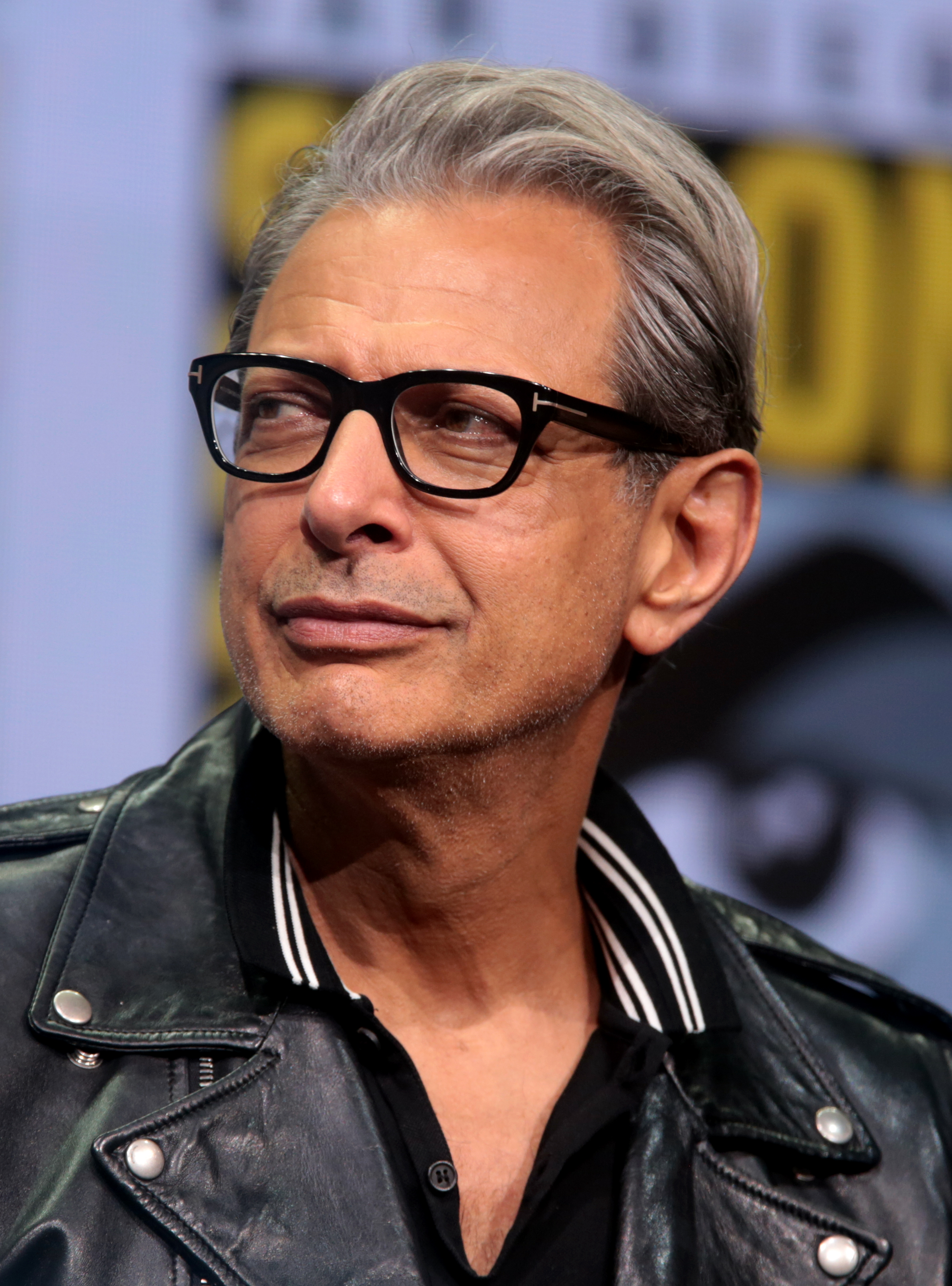
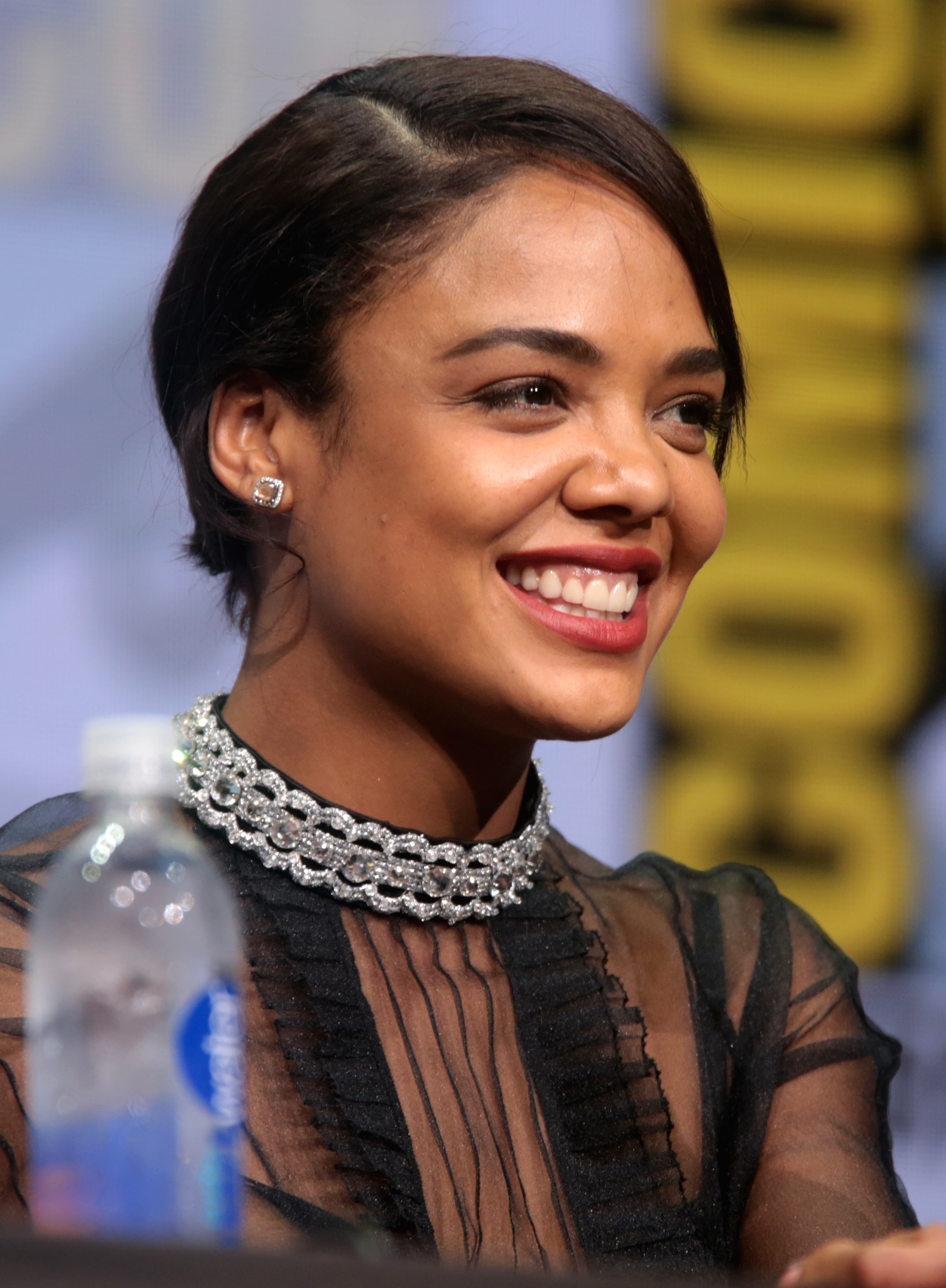
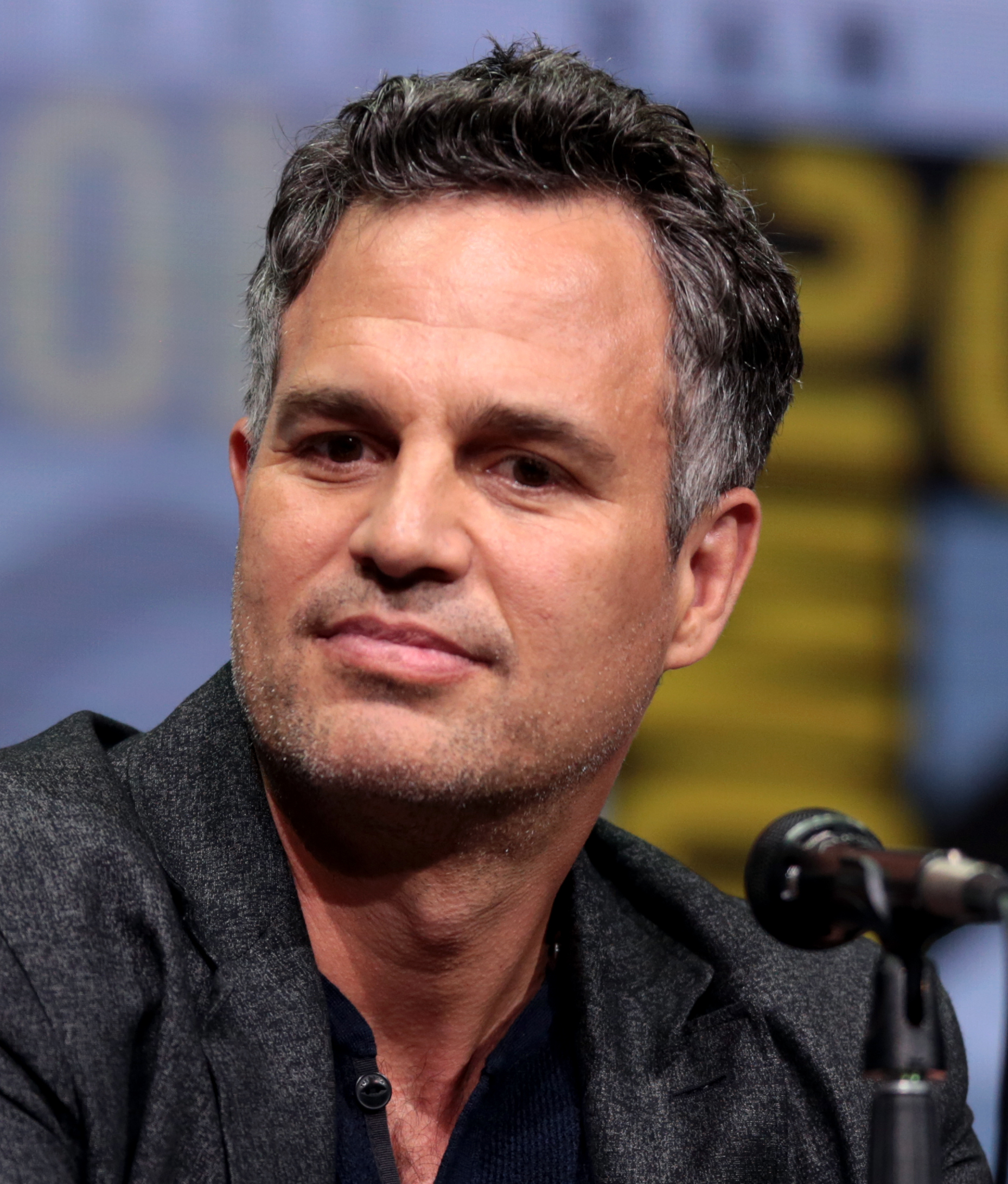
The performances of (top, L to R) Chris Hemsworth, Tom Hiddleston, Cate Blanchett, (bottom, L to R) Jeff Goldblum, Tessa Thompson, and Mark Ruffalo were widely praised by critics.

The review aggregator Rotten Tomatoes reported an approval rating of 93%, with an average score of 7.6/10, based on 437 reviews. The website's critical consensus reads, "Exciting, funny, and above all fun, Thor: Ragnarok is a colorful cosmic adventure that sets a new standard for its franchise—and the rest of the Marvel Cinematic Universe." Metacritic assigned a weighted average score of 74 out of 100 based on 51 critics, indicating "generally favorable" reviews. Audiences polled by CinemaScore gave the film an average grade of "A" on an A+ to F scale, the best of the Thor series, while PostTrak reported filmgoers gave it a 90% overall positive score and an 85% "definite recommend".

Sheri Linden of The Hollywood Reporter praised Waititi's handling of "the clash-of-worlds CGI extravaganza", particularly for the lighter tone he brought, with "even the story's central bad guys [being] silly fun, hammed to the hilt by Cate Blanchett and Jeff Goldblum." Alonso Duralde of TheWrap wrote, "Both the banter and the fighting, it should be noted, are excellent, so whether you go to superhero movies for the glossy escapism or the pulse-pounding action, you'll get your large soda's worth." Peter Travers of Rolling Stone rated the film three stars out of four, described it as "the most fun you'll ever have at a Marvel movie" while praising the film's changing tone and direction, comparing it favourably to Guardians of the Galaxy. The San Francisco Chronicle's Mick LaSalle lauded the performances of Hemsworth, Hiddleston, Blanchett, Thompson, Goldblum and Ruffalo, feeling the film "has confidence in its characters and in its own invention, and so it avoids repetition and stays fresh".

Richard Roeper of the Chicago Sun-Times similarly praised the film, calling the performances of the ensemble cast "outstanding" and Waititi's direction "goofy and campy and marvelously self-referential". He also said the soundtrack that was used in the climactic battle sequence, particularly Led Zeppelin's "Immigrant Song", was "perfectly synced". Matt Zoller Seitz of RogerEbert.com gave the film three out of four stars, positively comparing Hemsworth's performance to Cary Grant: "Hemsworth's charisma holds [Thor: Ragnarok] together whenever it threatens to spin apart". Justin Chang of Los Angeles Times praised Blanchett's performance of Hela, drawing a comparison of the portrayal of her character to other iconic villains such as Maleficent and Chernabog, and the film's similar themes and tone to Flash Gordon, Star Wars (1977), and Willy Wonka & the Chocolate Factory. The Daily Telegraph's Robbie Collin gave the film four out of five, hailed it as "one of [Marvel's] best films to date" while commending the performances and describing Mark Mothersbaugh's musical score as "turbo-charged". Michael Phillips of the Chicago Tribune commended the performances of Hiddleston and Thompson as being "wonderfully matched". He also noted a similar directing style of Waititi to Edgar Wright's "parodic work" and labelled the film as "unusually lively and buoyant" while acknowledging the effect of a "Marvel Fatigue factor" towards the audiences.

Peter Debruge of Variety called the movie "preposterous", but praised Goldblum's performance. Stephanie Zacharek of Time magazine stated negatively that "Thor: Ragnarok is packed tight with zooming space vehicles and noisy thunder battles, but the movie's extravagant excess is more narcotizing than energizing." Zacharek further added that "Even poor Thor seems lost in all of it, and he's supposed to be its star" while criticizing the film's visual effects as being "an instance of fun overkill" and "a special-effects coma". Manohla Dargis of The New York Times called the story "an uninteresting thicket of brawls, machinations and useful coincidences" but did feel that Hemsworth "looks happier and far more relaxed in Ragnarok than he did in the previous Thor vehicles, which is perhaps Mr. Waititi's truest achievement here."

Some critics claim that Thor: Ragnarok conceals sophisticated commentary under its comedic presentation, specifically on themes of colonial history and indigenous people. Key points in this discourse include Waititi's own indigenous Māori heritage; Asgard's bloody history and Odin's whitewashing of it, as revealed by Hela; Scrapper 142's burial in alcohol of her ethnic identity as a Valkyrie; and the Grandmaster's euphemizing of "slaves" as "prisoners with jobs".

=== Accolades ===
Year	Award	Category	Recipient(s)	Result	Ref(s)
2017	Washington D.C. Film Critics Awards	Best Motion Capture Performance	Taika Waititi	Nominated	
2018	Critics' Choice Awards	Best Action Movie	Thor: Ragnarok	Nominated	
2018	Critics' Choice Awards	Best Actor in a Comedy	Chris Hemsworth	Nominated	
2018	Critics' Choice Awards	Best Visual Effects	Thor: Ragnarok	Nominated	
2018	NAACP Image Awards	Outstanding Supporting Actor in a Motion Picture	Idris Elba	Won	
2018	NAACP Image Awards	Outstanding Supporting Actress in a Motion Picture	Tessa Thompson	Nominated	
2018	Visual Effects Society Awards	Outstanding Virtual Cinematography in a Photoreal Project	Hubert Maston, Arthur Moody, Adam Paschke, Casey Schatz for "Valkyrie's Flashback"	Nominated	
2018	Visual Effects Society Awards	Outstanding Compositing in a Photoreal Feature	Gavin McKenzie, David Simpson, Owen Carroll, Mark Gostlow for "Bridge Battle"	Nominated	
2018	Costume Designers Guild Awards	Excellence in Sci-Fi/Fantasy Film	Mayes C. Rubeo	Nominated	
2018	Empire Awards	Best Film	Thor: Ragnarok	Nominated	
2018	Empire Awards	Best Sci-Fi/Fantasy	Thor: Ragnarok	Nominated	
2018	Empire Awards	Best Director	Taika Waititi	Nominated	
2018	Empire Awards	Best Female Newcomer	Tessa Thompson	Nominated	
2018	Empire Awards	Best Production Design	Thor: Ragnarok	Nominated	
2018	Empire Awards	Best Visual Effects	Thor: Ragnarok	Nominated	
2018	Empire Awards	Best Costume Design	Mayes C. Rubeo	Nominated	
2018	Empire Awards	Best Makeup and Hairstyling	Thor: Ragnarok	Nominated	
2018	Nickelodeon Kids' Choice Awards	Favorite Movie Actor	Chris Hemsworth	Nominated	
2018	MTV Movie & TV Awards	Scene Stealer	Taika Waititi	Nominated	
2018	MTV Movie & TV Awards	Best Fight	Chris Hemsworth vs. Mark Ruffalo	Nominated	
2018	Saturn Awards	Best Comic-to-Motion Picture Release	Thor: Ragnarok	Nominated	
2018	Saturn Awards	Best Supporting Actress in a Film	Tessa Thompson	Nominated	
2018	Hugo Awards	Best Dramatic Presentation, Long Form	Eric Pearson, Craig Kyle, Christopher Yost, Taika Waititi	Nominated	
2018	Teen Choice Awards	Choice Sci-Fi Movie	Thor: Ragnarok	Nominated	
2018	Teen Choice Awards	Choice Sci-Fi Movie Actor	Chris Hemsworth	Won	
2018	Teen Choice Awards	Choice Sci-Fi Movie Actor	Mark Ruffalo	Nominated	
2018	Teen Choice Awards	Choice Sci-Fi Movie Actress	Tessa Thompson	Nominated	
2018	Teen Choice Awards	Choice Movie Villain	Cate Blanchett	Nominated	
2018	Teen Choice Awards	Choice Scene Stealer	Tom Hiddleston	Nominated	
2018	Teen Choice Awards	Choice Scene Stealer	Taika Waititi	Nominated	
2018	Hollywood Professional Association	Outstanding Visual Effects – Feature Film	Kyle McCulloch, Alexis Wajsbrot, Ben Loch, Harry Bardak (Framestore)	Nominated	

== Future ==
=== Sequel ===
A third sequel titled Thor: Love and Thunder was released on July 8, 2022. Hemsworth, Thompson, and Elba reprised their roles, with Natalie Portman, Jaimie Alexander, Kat Dennings, and Stellan Skarsgård returning after not appearing in Ragnarok. Portman portrayed her character taking on the mantle of Thor, similar to the comics. Additionally, Chris Pratt, Pom Klementieff, Dave Bautista, Karen Gillan, Vin Diesel, Bradley Cooper, and Sean Gunn reprise their roles as Guardians of the Galaxy members Peter Quill / Star-Lord, Mantis, Drax the Destroyer, Nebula, Groot, Rocket, and Kraglin Obfonteri. Christian Bale joined the cast as the villain Gorr the God Butcher.

=== Other ===
By the release of Ragnarok, Waititi and Marvel had discussed a spin-off Marvel One-Shot short film following the characters Korg and Miek, but it was unfeasible due to Marvel's commitment to producing three feature films a year. Feige said Marvel still had plans for those characters, but did not specify. Both appear in Avengers: Endgame and Love and Thunder.
