= The Strange Calls =

Television series

- Genre: Comedy
- Created by: Daley Pearson
- Written by: Daley Pearson; Anthony Mullins (1 episode)
- Directed by: Daley Pearson
- Country of origin: Australia
- Original language: English
- No. of series: 1
- No. of episodes: 6

Production
- Executive producers: Tracey Robertson; Nathan Mayfield; Debbie Lee; Brett Sleigh
- Producer: Tracey Robertson
- Production locations: Brisbane; Coolum Beach
- Production company: Hoodlum Entertainment

Original release
- Network: ABC2
- Release: 16 October – 20 November 2012

The Strange Calls is an Australian television comedy series based on a short film with the same title, which had been produced by Daley Pearson and released in 2011. The series, broadcast in 2012, follows the adventures of Toby Banks, a young and recently disgraced police constable transferred from the city to a small town, and his elderly companion, Gregor, who every night receive strange calls from townspeople.

== Production ==
The six-part series was created, written and directed by Daley Pearson, and was produced by Tracey Robertson, Nathan Mayfield and Leigh McGrath. Filming took place over four weeks in Coolum and Brisbane. The series was first screened on ABC2 in October and November 2012.

== Cast ==
- Barry Crocker as Gregor
- Toby Truslove as Officer Toby Banks
- Patrick Brammall as Sergeant Neil Lloyd
- Katherine Hicks as Kath
- Nick Simpson-Deeks as Nick

== Episodes ==
(Episode information retrieved from Australian Television Information Archive).

No.	Title	Directed by	Written by	Original release date
1	"First Call"	Daley Pearson	Daley Pearson	16 October 2012
2	"Jingle"	Daley Pearson	Daley Pearson	23 October 2012
3	"Phantom"	Daley Pearson	Anthony Mullins	30 October 2012
4	"Napoleon"	Daley Pearson	Daley Pearson	6 November 2012
5	"Fish"	Daley Pearson	Daley Pearson	13 November 2012
6	"Roots"	Daley Pearson	Daley Pearson	20 November 2012
