= Charlotte Nicdao =

Australian actress

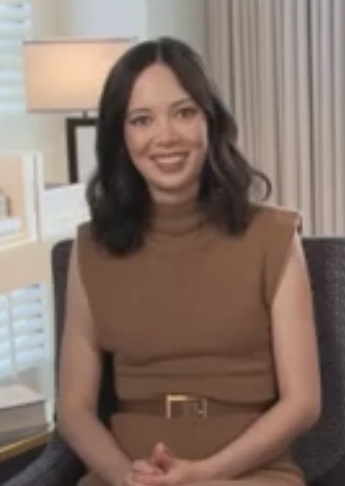
- Nicdao in 2022
- Born: Melbourne, Victoria, Australia
- Occupations: Actress, composer
- Years active: 2004–present
- Spouse: Bayden Hine
- Children: 1

Charlotte Nicdao is an Australian actress. She is known for starring as Jackie Lee in the Nine Network series A gURLs wURLd (2010–2011) and as Poppy Li in the Apple TV+ comedy Mythic Quest (2020–2025).

== Career ==
Nicdao attended Victorian College of Arts and studied jazz and classical music. After an audition for a role in which she did not get the part, Nicdao discovered that her true love was acting:

Strangely, what made me realise that I wanted to pursue acting was missing out on a role that I had thought I was born to play. I was devastated for weeks after being rejected. It finally dawned on me that I’d never felt that kind of disappointment in my life, so doing this must be something I really wanted.

Nicdao's big break happened in 2008 when she was cast as Jackie in A gURLs wURLd. Nicdao auditioned when she was 17. The show filmed in Sydney, Singapore, and Hamburg, so Nicdao completed the final year of high school by distance education with the goal to return to Melbourne and make a career out of jazz singing.

Nicdao starred in the short film Emo, directed by Neil Tiffett, which won a 'special mention' at the prestigious Berlinale International Film Festival in 2014— the runner-up to the Crystal Bear for best short film in Berlinale’s Generation section. When the short was adapted to a full-length film Emo: The Musical, released in 2016, she was credited as an associate producer.

In 2014, Nicdao joined the second season cast of Josh Thomas' Australian TV series Please Like Me, and played the role of Tom's girlfriend Jenny.

In 2019, Nicdao starred as Lucy in Content, a made-for-phone online video series. The first episode, about a millennial who wanted to go viral, actually went viral when the video of her crashing her car was shared by many who thought it was footage of a real accident.

In 2020, Nicdao began starring as Poppy in Mythic Quest. Nicdao described the role as her dream role. About the advent of more roles for people of Asian heritage, Nicdao stated about her role in Mythic Quest, "I think there was a time with the only characters available to me were very one dimensional and now I'm getting to play this very complex woman at the center of a story and it's beautiful."

Nicdao voiced See-Thru Princess, the ruler of the Glass Kingdom, in Adventure Time: Distant Lands.

== Personal life ==
Nicdao was inspired by her father, Filipino Australian actor Alfred Nicdao. As a child, she would often be called to auditions by her father's agent. Alfred is best known for his work in the Australian soap opera Neighbours, Tomorrow When the War Began, and Blue Heelers.

In 2012, Nicdao formed pop music group Charlotte Nicdao and the Sloth Orchestra with friends from college. In January 2013, the band successfully crowdfund their debut EP, recorded at Sing Sing studios with Australian music engineer Adam Rhodes. Plans to release the album in March 2013 were put on hold when Nicdao was cast in the NBC television series Camp, and delayed the release of the EP to 2014. Nicdao describes herself as "a passive-aggressive sunshine pop fairy". Nicdao started training as a jazz singer when she was 15, inspired by Ella Fitzgerald, John Coltrane, Miles Davis, and Keith Jarrett.

Nicdao and her husband Bayden Hine ran a plant store in Melbourne known as Plant by Packwood. The store closed in November 2019.

When asked by 1883 magazine which big movie franchise Nicdao would love to be a part of, she expressed her deep love of Star Wars, especially Yoda, for whom she made a fan club at school.

Nicdao had her first child in 2024.

== Filmography ==
Television and film roles
Year	Title	Role	Notes
2004	Fergus McPhail	Betty	Episode: "Every Stick Has Two Wrong Ends"
2008	The Elephant Princess	Hannah	Episode: "Coming of Age"
2010–2011	A gURLs wURLd	Jackie Lee	Main role
2011	The Slap	Tina	Miniseries
2013	The Time of Our Lives	Clara Bell	2 episodes
2013	Camp	Grace	Main role
2014	Please Like Me	Jenny	Recurring role
2015	Childhood's End	Rachel Osaka	TV miniseries
2015	The Subjects	Lilly	Film
2015–2018	Kuu Kuu Harajuku	Baby	Main voice role
2017	Trip for Biscuits	Violet	Main role
2017	Get Krack!n	Scarlett	Recurring role
2017	Thor: Ragnarok	Sif actress	Film
2018	Bluey	Nurse / Checkout Lady	Voice role; 2 episodes
2019	Content	Lucy	Web series; main role
2019–present	The Strange Chores	Que	Main role
2020–2025	Mythic Quest	Poppy	Main role
2020	Adventure Time: Distant Lands	See-Thru Princess, Ancient Glass Princess	Voice role; episode: "Obsidian"
2022	Zootopia+	Sam	Voice role; episode: "Dinner Rush"
2022–2024	Star Trek: Lower Decks	Meredith	Voice role; episodes: "Room for Growth", "In the Cradle of Vexilon", and “Upper Decks”
2023	Animaniacs	Abigail	Voice role; episode: "Royal Flush"
2024	Austin	Yolanda Cox	Recurring role
2024–present	Solar Opposites	Sofia	Main role in "The Wall" subplot, Season 5
