= Up Here (Bluey soundtrack) =

Soundtrack album by Joff Bush
- Released: 27 March 2026
- Genre: Soundtrack
- Length: 41:37
- Label: Demon
- Producer: Joff Bush

Joff Bush chronology
Rug Island (2024)	Up Here (2026)

Singles from Up Here
- 1. "Bluey Theme Song (Orchestral Version)" Released: 28 January 2026; 2. "Sleepytime" Released: 26 February 2026

Up Here is the fourth soundtrack album of the Australian animated television series Bluey. Most of the soundtrack's music was composed and performed by Joff Bush, the composer for the television program, alongside a team of musicians. It was released on 27 March 2026 through Demon Music Group, a subdivision of BBC Studios, who, having published all the other soundtrack releases for the show, hold global rights to release the show's music.

Prior to release, the singles "Bluey Theme Song (Orchestral Version)" and "Sleepytime" were released on 28 January and 26 February 2026 respectively.

At the 2026 ARIA Music Awards it won Best Children's Album.

== Background and composition ==
Joff Bush serves as the primary composer of Bluey, writing half of the television show's score himself and leading a group of additional composers, including David Barber. Bush graduated from the Queensland Conservatorium, where he met executive producer Daley Pearson, and before Bluey, worked on series such as The Family Law and Australian Survivor. Bush has stated that each episode has its own unique musical style, and he likes to become involved in the episodes as they are scripted; he regularly has detailed discussions with series creator Joe Brumm. Live instruments are regularly played for the recordings. Every episode of Bluey is individually scored, a decision made by Brumm, who was inspired by the original compositions for Charlie and Lola while working on the series in the United Kingdom.

Bush recorded a soundtrack for the first series of the program, titled Bluey: The Album, which was released on 22 January 2021. The soundtrack debuted at number one on the ARIA Albums Chart in February 2021. It was recognised as the first children's album to reach the top of the charts in Australia. It won Best Children's Album at the 2021 ARIA Music Awards, and an APRA Screen Music Award for Best Soundtrack Album in 2021. The second album, titled Dance Mode!, was released on 21 April 2023. A third album, titled Rug Island, was released on 25 October 2024.

== Description ==
The fourth album, Up Here, features tracks spanning across all three seasons of Bluey. Bush has stated that the theme of the album was "growing up", stating that "much of this music, like the episodes they derive from, explore what it means when kids start to discover their independence and venture out on their own." The album is headlined by the musical piece "Sleepytime", named after the episode of the same name.

The album features tracks played with full symphony orchestra for the first time. The over 100 musicians include members of the Queensland Symphony Orchestra and Camerata – Queensland's Chamber Orchestra, along with others who regularly work with the Bluey team.

== Release ==
The existence of Up Here was revealed in Rough Trade's online store on 22 January 2026. Retailer Townsend Music would reveal the track list a few days later. The album, and its release date, was officially revealed on the Bluey Instagram account on 28 January 2026.

Prior to release, the singles "Bluey Theme Song (Orchestral Version)" and "Sleepytime" were released on 28 January and 26 February 2026 respectively.

The album had its global release on 27 March 2026 through Demon Music Group, a subdivision of BBC Studios, who, having published all the other soundtrack releases for the show, hold global rights to release the show's music. It was released on CD, streaming services, blue vinyl, and a limited edition black and blue splatter vinyl.

== Track listing ==
All songs written, arranged and produced by Joff Bush except where noted.

Up Here track listing
No.	Title	Writer(s)	Feat.	Length
1.	"Bluey Theme Tune" (Orchestral version)	Bush arr. Joseph Twist	Serenade No. 13 for Strings in D Major, K. 525 (Eine kleine Nachtmusik) by Wolfgang Amadeus Mozart; Violin Concerto in E major, RV 269 I. Allegro, (Spring) by Antonio Vivaldi; Brandenburg Concerto No. 5 in D major, BWV 1050, I. Allegro by Johann Sebastian Bach; Rhapsody in Blue by George Gershwin; Piano Sonata No. 11 in A major, K. 331 / 300i III. Rondo Alla Turca by Wolfgang Amadeus Mozart; The Sailor's Hornpipe (traditional)	3:23
2.	"Sleepytime"	Bush; David Barber	The Planets Op. 32 4. Jupiter, the Bringer of Jollity by Gustav Holst	5:01
3.	"Puppets"			1:45
4.	"Curry Quest"			3:03
5.	"Alongside"	Daniel O'Brien; Bush		2:24
6.	"Ice Cream" (Waltz of the Flowers)	arr. Bush	The Nutcracker, Op. 71, Act 2: No 13, Waltz of the Flowers by Pyotr Ilyich Tchaikovsky	1:39
7.	"Flat Pack"	Bush arr. Bush, Twist		3:38
8.	"Hotel"			1:19
9.	"Seesaw"	arr. Bush, Twist	Concerto a due cori No. 2, HWV 333 by George Frideric Handel	2:09
10.	"Pirates"	David Barber; Bush		3:04
11.	"Stumpfest"	arr. Bush, Barber	Concerto No. 5 in D major, BWV 1050.2 I. Allegro by Johann Sebastian Bach	2:26
12.	"Tradies"			1:56
13.	"Relax"	arr. O'Brien, Bush	Simple Gifts (traditional)	2:22
14.	"Space"			3:08
15.	"Mount Mumandad"	Barber; Bush		1:56
16.	"We'll See"	Bush arr. Bush, Twist		1:24
17.	"Bluey Theme Tune" (The Sign version)	Bush arr.: Bush; Twist		0:51
Total length:				41:37

== Charts ==
Chart performance for Up Here
Chart (2026)	Peak position
Australian Albums (ARIA)	31
Australian Classical Albums (ARIA)	1
Australian Classical/Crossover Albums (ARIA)	1
UK Albums Sales (OCC)	92
UK Independent Albums (Official Charts)	36
US Kid Albums (Billboard)	3
US Top Classical Albums (Billboard)	2
US Top Classical Crossover Albums (Billboard)	2
