= The Bluey Movie =

Upcoming film by Joe Brumm

- Teaser poster
- Directed by: Joe Brumm
- Written by: Joe Brumm
- Based on: Bluey by Joe Brumm
- Produced by: Amber Naismith
- Starring: Melanie Zanetti; David McCormack
- Music by: Joff Bush
- Production companies: Ludo Studio (Note: Credited as "Judo Studio"); BBC Studios; Cosmic Dino Studio
- Distributed by: Walt Disney Studios Motion Pictures (Note: Distributed under the Walt Disney Pictures banner.)
- Release date: 6 August 2027
- Countries: Australia; United Kingdom
- Language: English

The Bluey Movie is an upcoming animated comedy film based on the Australian children's television series Bluey. It is written and directed by series creator Joe Brumm, and is produced by Ludo Studio and BBC Studios. In the film, a busy day for the Heeler family is upended by a big surprise. Melanie Zanetti and David McCormack reprise their voice roles from the series alongside the anonymous child voice actors.

Both Brumm and executive producer Daley Pearson expressed interest in a film adaptation of the series after working on the long-form episode "The Sign". The film was announced in 2024 and promoted at the D23 Expo in 2026. Australian animation studio Cosmic Dino Studio provides the 3D computer animation, in contrast to the television series' 2D animation.

The Bluey Movie is scheduled to be released in theaters by Walt Disney Studios Motion Pictures on 6 August 2027.

== Premise ==
On an action-packed day, Bluey Heeler and her family experience a big surprise.

== Voice cast ==
- Melanie Zanetti as Chilli Heeler
- David McCormack as Bandit Heeler

As with the television series, the child actors are kept anonymous to protect their privacy.

== Production ==
Bluey creator Joe Brumm enjoyed the experience of working on the long-form series 3 episode "The Sign" and told the press he thought that making a feature film would be the natural next step. Ahead of the episode's release in April 2024, executive producer Daley Pearson expressed interest in creating a film adaptation of the series.

In December 2024, BBC Studios and The Walt Disney Company announced that a Bluey film, provisionally titled Bluey: The Movie, was in development. Brumm was set to write and direct after previously working on the animated television series as the director, writer, and showrunner, while Richard Jeffery will serve as co-director after directing the television episodes "Sleepytime" and "The Sign". The voice cast and crew, including the anonymous child actors, of the regular series will return, while Joff Bush will return as the composer. Amber Naismith will serve as the producer, and Cosmic Dino Studio will provide the film's animation. In March 2026, the film had been given the title The Bluey Movie, which was confirmed with the reveal of the teaser trailer at the D23 exposition event in August 2026. During a Bluey panel at the event, on the film being animated in 3D, Brumm stated: "We're always striving to get a beauty of nature in the show, and I wanted to have every tool available to capture a beautiful blade of grass and light rays and all that, and I wanted kids to be able to feel like they could reach in and give these little dogs a scratch on their furry heads."

The Bluey Movie is a joint collaboration between Disney, BBC Studios and Ludo Studio. Disney will handle global theatrical and streaming rights, the latter outside of Australia. BBC Studios will be responsible for financing and licensing rights, and Ludo Studio will produce the film. Financial support for the film is provided by the federal government of Australia and the state government of Queensland by tax incentives.

== Release ==
The Bluey Movie is scheduled to be released theatrically worldwide on 6 August 2027.

=== Marketing ===
A teaser trailer debuted at the D23 Expo on 14 August 2026. Fans shared mixed opinions on social media regarding the designs of the traditionally 2D characters that were converted to 3D.

=== Home media ===
After its theatrical release, the film will stream on ABC iView and ABC Kids in Australia, and Disney+ in the United States.
