= 2027 in animation =

2027 in animation is an overview of notable events, including notable awards, list of films released, television show debuts and endings, and notable deaths.

== Events ==
=== January ===
- January 1: The Mickey Mouse cartoon The Moose Hunt will enter the public domain. Alongside the earliest iterations of Norakuro and Babar the Elephant.
- January 19: Season 2 of Blue Eye Samurai will premiere on Netflix.
- January 20: The third season of Kiff will premiere on Disney Channel and Disney XD simultaneously.
- January 22: Episode 3 of Knights of Guinevere will premiere on YouTube.
- January 24: The second season of Common Side Effects will premiere on Adult Swim.
- TBA: Season 2 of Your Friendly Neighborhood Spider-Man will premiere on Disney+.

=== February ===
- February 5: Ice Age: Boiling Point will release in theaters. This will be the first movie in the franchise not to be produced by its original animation studio Blue Sky Studios (due to its closure in 2021), instead it being 20th Century Animation.
- February 17: Season 5 of Invincible will premiere on Prime Video.
- February 19: CoComelon: The Movie will release in theaters.
- February 27: Oswald, a live-action animated series about Oswald The Lucky Rabbit, will premiere on Disney+.

=== March ===
- March 5:
  - Doraemon: Nobita's Steam-Powered Time Machine will release in Japanese theaters.
  - Disney-Pixar's Gatto will release in theaters.
- March 14: The 99th Academy Awards will premiere on ABC.
- March 19: The live-action/animated film Sonic the Hedgehog 4 from Paramount Pictures will release in theaters.
- TBA: Episode 2 of The Gaslight District, titled "Gospel of Whispers", will premiere on YouTube.

=== April ===
- April 16:
  - Illumination's Not Alone will release in theaters.
  - Episode 4 of Knights of Guinevere will premiere on YouTube.

=== May ===
- May 21:
  - Warner Bros. Pictures Animation's Bad Fairies will release in theaters.
  - Episode 2 of Gameoverse will premiere on YouTube.
  - Season 2 of Avatar: Seven Havens will premiere on Paramount+.

=== June ===
- June 11: The live-action/animated remake of How to Train Your Dragon 2 will release in theaters.
- June 18: Spider-Man: Beyond the Spider-Verse, the final installment in the Spider-Verse trilogy, will release in theaters. The film will immediately follow up from the events of its predecessor Across the Spider-Verse.
- June 30: DreamWorks Animation's Shrek 5 will release in theaters.

=== August ===
- August 6: Joe Brumm's The Bluey Movie will release in theaters.
- August 12: Aeroplane Productions' The Fixies and Aliens will be released.
- August 13: The currently untitled sequel to Teenage Mutant Ninja Turtles: Mutant Mayhem will release in theaters.
- August 27: Episode 3 of Gameoverse will premiere on YouTube.

=== September ===
- September 3: The New Simpsons Movie (the sequel to 2007's The Simpsons Movie) will release in theaters.
- September 24: An untitled DreamWorks Animation film will be released.

=== October ===
- October 8: The Haunting of Hotel Transylvania will release in theaters.
- October 29: Episode 4 of Gameoverse will premiere on YouTube.

=== November ===
- November 5: Charlie vs. the Chocolate Factory will be released.
- November 12: Warner Bros. Pictures Animation's Margie Claus will release in theaters.
- November 24: Walt Disney Animation Studios' Frozen 3 will release in theaters.

=== December ===
- December 22:
  - Charlie vs. the Chocolate Factory will premiere on Netflix.
  - Sony Pictures Animation's Buds will be released.

=== Teased release dates ===
- Season 2 of Dragon Striker will premiere on Disney XD in early 2027.
- Wish Dragon 2 will release this summer.
- Season 23 of American Dad! will premiere on Fox in the first quarter.
- My Little Pony: Forever Friendship will premiere on YouTube in the first quarter.
- Season 10 of Rick and Morty will premiere on Adult Swim this summer.

=== Specific date unknown ===
- Planeswalker, an adult animated Magic: The Gathering series centered on the character Chandra Nalaar, will premiere on Netflix.
- Season 3 of Hazbin Hotel will premiere on Prime Video.
- The second half of Season 3 of Helluva Boss will premiere on Prime Video (and release on YouTube the following month), and will feature a crossover with Hazbin Hotel.
- Season 3 of Haunted Hotel will premiere on Netflix.
- Season 3 of X-Men '97 will premiere on Disney+.
- Season 2 of Star Wars: Maul – Shadow Lord will premiere on Disney+.
- Season 30 of South Park will premiere on Comedy Central.
- The Simpsons will conclude its 38th season on Fox.
- Season 4 of SuperKitties will premiere on Disney Channel & Disney Jr. in the United States.
- Cars: Lightning Racers (a preschool series based off the Cars franchise) will premiere on Disney Jr. and Disney+.
- Ghostbusters: Night Shift (an animated series based off the Ghostbusters franchise) will premiere on Netflix.
- Motel Transylvania (an animated series based off the Hotel Transylvania franchise) will premiere on Netflix.
- Gaumont Animation's animated film adaptation of Paul McCartney's book High in the Clouds will be released.
- An untitled nWave Studios film will be released.

== Awards ==
- Academy Award for Best Animated Feature: TBA
- Academy Award for Best Animated Short Film: TBA
- American Cinema Editors Award for Best Edited Animated Feature Film: TBA
- Annecy International Animation Film Festival Cristal du long métrage: TBA
- Annie Award for Best Animated Feature: TBA
- Annie Award for Best Animated Feature – Independent: TBA
- Annie Award for Best Animated Television Production: TBA
- Astra Film Award for Best Animated Film: TBA
- Astra TV Award for Best Animated Series: TBA
- Austin Film Critics Association Award for Best Animated Film: TBA
- BAFTA Award for Best Animated Film: TBA
- BAFTA Award for Best Short Animation: TBA
- Boston Society of Film Critics Award for Best Animated Film: TBA
- Central Ohio Film Critics Association Awards for Best Animated Feature: TBA
- César Award for Best Animated Film: TBA
- Chicago Film Critics Association Award for Best Animated Film: TBA
- Critics' Choice Movie Award for Best Animated Feature: TBA
- Critics' Choice Television Award for Best Animated Series: TBA
- Dallas–Fort Worth Film Critics Association Award for Best Animated Film: TBA
- European Film Award for Best Animated Feature Film: TBA
- Florida Film Critics Circle Award for Best Animated Film: TBA
- Golden Globe Award for Best Animated Feature Film: TBA
- Golden Reel Award for Outstanding Achievement in Sound Editing – Sound Effects, Foley, Dialogue and ADR for Animated Feature Film: TBA
- Goya Award for Best Animated Film: TBA
- Japan Academy Film Prize for Animation of the Year: TBA
- Kids' Choice Award for Favorite Animated Movie: TBA
- Los Angeles Film Critics Association Award for Best Animated Film: TBA
- Minnesa Film Critics Alliance Award for Best Animated Feature: TBA
- NAACP Image Award for Outstanding Animated Motion Picture: TBA
- National Board of Review Award for Best Animated Film: TBA
- New York Film Critics Circle Award for Best Animated Film: TBA
- Online Film Critics Society Award for Best Animated Film: TBA
- Producers Guild of America Award for Best Animated Motion Picture: TBA
- San Diego Film Critics Society Award for Best Animated Film: TBA
- San Francisco Bay Area Film Critics Circle Award for Best Animated Feature: TBA
- Saturn Award for Best Animated Film: TBA
- Seattle Film Critics Society Award for Best Animated Feature: TBA
- St. Louis Film Critics Association Award for Best Animated Feature: TBA
- Tokyo Anime Award: TBA
- Toronto Film Critics Association Award for Best Animated Film: TBA
- Visual Effects Society Award for Outstanding Visual Effects in an Animated Feature: TBA
- Washington D.C. Area Film Critics Association Award for Best Animated Feature: TBA

== Television series debuts ==
| Date | Title | Channel, Streaming |
|---|---|---|
| March | Skye's Pup Squad | Nickelodeon |
| TBA | SuperMutant Magic Academy | Adult Swim |
| TBA | Messi and the Giants | Disney Channel |
| TBA | The Sunnyridge 3 | Disney Channel |
| TBA | Cars: Lightning Racers | Disney Jr. |
| TBA | Avengers: Mightiest Friends | Disney Jr. |
| TBA | Stewie | Fox, Hulu |
| TBA | Ghostbusters: Night Shift | Netflix |
| TBA | Mafalda | Netflix |
| TBA | Motel Transylvania | Netflix |
| TBA | Planeswalker | Netflix |
| TBA | Clifford the Big Red Dog | PBS Kids |
| TBA | Foster's Funtime for Imaginary Friends | TBA |

== Television series endings ==
| Date | Title | Channel, Streaming | Year | Notes |
|---|---|---|---|---|
| TBA | Peppa Pig | Nick Jr. | 2004–2027 | Ending |
| TBA | Pupstruction | Disney Jr., Disney+ | 2023–2027 | Ending |

== Television season premieres ==
| Date | Title | Season | Channel, Streaming |
|---|---|---|---|
| January 19 | Blue Eye Samurai | 2 | Netflix |
| January 20 | Kiff | 3 | Disney Channel, Disney XD |
| January 24 | Common Side Effects | 2 | Adult Swim, HBO Max |
| January | Your Friendly Neighborhood Spider-Man | 2 | Disney+ |
| February 17 | Invincible | 5 | Amazon Prime Video |
| May 21 | Avatar: Seven Havens | 2 | Paramount+ |
| TBA | Rick and Morty | 10 | Adult Swim |
| TBA | South Park | 30 | Comedy Central |
| TBA | SuperKitties | 4 | Disney Channel, Disney Jr. |
| TBA | Dragon Striker | 2 | Disney XD |
| TBA | Star Wars: Maul – Shadow Lord | 2 | Disney+ |
| TBA | X-Men '97 | 3 | Disney+ |
| TBA | American Dad! | 23 | Fox |
| TBA | Haunted Hotel | 3 | Netflix |

== Television season finales ==
| Date | Title | Season | Channel, Streaming |
|---|---|---|---|
| TBA | The Simpsons | 38 | Fox |
