= Rug Island =

Soundtrack album by Joff Bush
- Released: 25 October 2024
- Recorded: 2023
- Genre: Soundtrack
- Length: 40:51
- Label: Demon
- Producer: Joff Bush

Joff Bush chronology
Dance Mode! (2023)	Rug Island (2024)	Up Here (2026)

Singles from Rug Island
- 1. "Octopus" Released: 2 August 2024; 2. "Onesies" Released: 30 August 2024; 3. "Bluey Theme Tune (Vocal Version)" Released: 4 October 2024

Rug Island is the third soundtrack album of the Australian animated television series Bluey. It was released on 25 October 2024 by Demon Records. Most of the soundtrack's music was composed and performed by Joff Bush, the composer for the television program, alongside a team of musicians.

Much like the previous two albums, the soundtrack was released through Demon Music Group, a subdivision of BBC Studios, who hold global rights to release the show's music. Leading up to the album's release, three singles were released; the first, "Octopus", was released on 2 August 2024, the second, "Onesies", was released on 30 August 2024, and the third, a vocal version of the Bluey theme song, was released on 4 October 2024.

== Background and composition ==
Joff Bush serves as the primary composer of Bluey, writing half of the television show's score himself and leading a group of additional composers, including David Barber. Bush graduated from the Queensland Conservatorium, where he met executive producer Daley Pearson, and before Bluey, worked on series such as The Family Law and Australian Survivor. Bush has stated that each episode has its own unique musical style, and he likes to become involved in the episodes as they are scripted; he regularly has detailed discussions with series creator Joe Brumm. Live instruments are regularly played for the recordings. Every episode of Bluey is individually scored, a decision made by Brumm, who was inspired by the original compositions for Charlie and Lola while working on the series in the United Kingdom.

Bush recorded a soundtrack for the first series of the program, titled Bluey: The Album, which was released on 22 January 2021. The soundtrack debuted at number one on the ARIA Albums Chart in February 2021. It was recognised as the first children's album to reach the top of the charts in Australia. It won Best Children's Album at the 2021 ARIA Music Awards, and an APRA Screen Music Award for Best Soundtrack Album in 2021. The second album, titled Dance Mode!, was released on 21 April 2023.

Rug Island features songs from the second and third series of Bluey. The album is headlined by a three-part musical piece from "Rug Island", the namesake of the album; other notable pieces include a single titled "Octopus", featuring Australian rock band King Stingray, "Fairytale", an "'80's-inspired synth rock", "Explorers", described as a "traditional style sea shanty" modeled after Jack Russell's expedition in the titular episode, "Muffin Drive", described as a "driving rock song", and the "simple sweet" piece "Turtleboy". "Explorers" and "Cricket" features contributions from Steven Peach and Pluto Jonze respectively. Production on the album began in 2023.

== Release ==
The soundtrack, titled Rug Island, was officially announced on 1 August 2024, with pre-orders opening the following day. The album was released on 25 October 2024 on CD, streaming services, and orange vinyl, including a limited edition vinyl picture disc.

== Track listing ==
All songs written and produced by Joff Bush except where noted.

Rug Island track listing
No.	Title	Length
1.	"Bluey Theme Tune" (vocal version)	1:23
2.	"Rug Island, Pt. 1"	1:29
3.	"Obstacle Course"	3:09
4.	"Octopus" (featuring King Stingray)	2:41
5.	"Wild Girls"	2:42
6.	"Escape"	2:43
7.	"Onesies"	3:24
8.	"Fairytale"	2:57
9.	"Rug Island, Pt. 2"	1:17
10.	"Explorers" (featuring Steven Peach)	3:20
11.	"Muffin Drive"	1:11
12.	"Turtleboy"	2:48
13.	"Bin Night"	3:14
14.	"Cricket" (featuring Pluto Jonze)	3:37
15.	"Café"	3:17
16.	"Rug Island, Pt. 3"	1:39
Total length:		40:51

== Charts ==
Chart performance for Rug Island
Chart (2024)	Peak position
Australian Albums (ARIA)	82
