= Bluey Theme Tune =

2020 title song for Bluey

Single by Bluey and Joff Bush

from the album Bluey: The Album
- Released: 6 November 2020
- Length: 0:25
- Label: Ludo
- Songwriters: Joff Bush; Jonathan Bush
- Producers: Joff Bush; Marly Luske

"Bluey Theme Tune" is the theme song of the Australian animated series Bluey. The song, credited to the show and songwriter Joff Bush, was released as a single on 6 November 2020 as the lead single from Bluey: The Album (2021). The song is a roll call of the main Heeler family members—Mum (Chilli), Dad (Bandit), Bingo and Bluey—in that order, who play musical statues in the show's opening sequence, with each name being called out when caught moving when the music stops.

In December 2023, Dutch, French, German, Italian and Spanish versions were released.

Alternate versions have been released, including a version for the episode "Bingo" in which the titular character is called out last instead of her sister Bluey, and an extended version that calls out several of Bluey and Bingo's friends, including their cousins Muffin and Socks. One made in collaboration with The Walt Disney Company features the Heelers dancing alongside Mickey Mouse and his friends, as they appear in Mickey Mouse Clubhouse+. Variants of the theme were also released: an "instrument parade" version was included on Bluey: The Album, a dance version was included on the Dance Mode! album (2023), a vocal version was included on the Rug Island album (2024), a Christmas version was included on the Verandah Santa EP (2025), and an orchestral version was included on the Up Here album (2026).

== Track listings ==
digital download

1. "Bluey Theme Tune" - 0:24
2. "Bluey Theme Tune" (extended) - 1:06

digital download

1. "Bluey's Titelmuziek" (Bluey Theme Song - Dutch version) - 1:04

digital download

1. "Le générique de Bluey" (Bluey Theme Song - French version) - 1:04

digital download

1. "Bluey Titelsong" (Bluey Theme Song - German version) - 1:04

digital download

1. "La sigla di Bluey" (Bluey Theme Song - Italian version) - 1:04

digital download

1. "La canción de Bluey" (Bluey Theme Song - Spanish version) - 1:04

== Certifications ==
Certifications for "Bluey Theme Song"
Region	Certification	Certified units/sales
Australia (ARIA)	Platinum	70,000^{‡}
United Kingdom (BPI)	Silver	200,000^{‡}
^{‡} Sales+streaming figures based on certification alone.
