= Bluey's Quest for the Gold Pen =

2025 video game

- Developer: Halfbrick Studios
- Publisher: Halfbrick Studios
- Writer: Joe Brumm
- Composer: Joff Bush
- Series: Bluey
- Engine: Unity
- Platforms: iOS; iPadOS; macOS; Android; Nintendo Switch; Nintendo Switch 2; PlayStation 4; PlayStation 5; Windows; Xbox Series X/S
- Release: iOS, iPadOS, macOS; 11 December 2025; Android; 10 January 2026; NS, NS2, PS4, PS5, Win, XBSX/S; 28 May 2026
- Genre: Adventure
- Mode: Single-player

Bluey's Quest for the Gold Pen is a 2025 adventure video game developed by Halfbrick Studios. The fourth video game to be based on the television series Bluey, it features an original story written by series creator Joe Brumm. It was released on 11 December 2025 for iOS, iPadOS, and macOS, 10 January 2026 for Android and 28 May 2026 for Nintendo Switch, Nintendo Switch 2, PlayStation 4, PlayStation 5, Windows, and Xbox Series X/S. The game received generally positive reviews from critics, who noted it as an improvement over previous Bluey video games.

== Gameplay ==
The plot centers on the Heeler family being transported into Bluey's drawings on an adventure to retrieve her gold pen, which she needs to complete her drawing. Bluey's Quest for the Gold Pen is a Zelda-like adventure game made simpler for younger children. Players play as Bluey as she and her family explore her drawings across nine levels, which include locations based on the show. Bluey's sister, Bingo, is called Bingoose and will lay a silver egg when the player feeds her enough food. Bandit plays the role of the antagonist, referred to as "King Goldie Horns", and Chilli plays the role of "Creator of Worlds".

== Development ==
Bluey's Quest for the Gold Pen was developed by Australian developer Halfbrick Studios, and features an original story from series creator Joe Brumm. Brumm collaborated with game developers Halfbrick Studios in order to make the game. CEO of Halfbrick Studios Shainiel Deo wanted to create a game that children and families would cherish as among their favourite games of all time. With Brumm having worked with Halfbrick in the past with projects like Dan the Man, the pre-existing friendship between him and Deo made it easy to create an authentic experience to Bluey while still ultimately making a good game. Brumm described it as feeling like "the simple setup you'd get from a Commodore 64 platformer – we've got a problem, and we've got a villain, so let's go get it." Creative inspiration was taken from one episode in particular, "Dragon", which established that the children have an age-appropriate artstyle, Bandit's artstyle is worse than that of the kids' due to dropping it from bullying, and Chilli's drawings are neat since she was encouraged to pursue it into adulthood.

== Release ==
Bluey's Quest for the Gold Pen was released for iOS, iPadOS, Android, and Nintendo Switch, Nintendo Switch 2, PlayStation 4, PlayStation 5, Windows on both Steam and the Epic Games Store, and Xbox Series X/S. The iOS and Android versions of the title feature a free demo, with a one-time payment to unlock the full game.

== Reception ==
Reception

Aggregate scores
Aggregator	Score
Metacritic	(PC) 85/100 (NS2) 72/100
OpenCritic	59% recommend

Review score
Publication	Score
GameSpot	7/10

According to the review aggregation website Metacritic, the PC version of Bluey's Quest for the Gold Pen received generally favorable reviews from critics, while the Nintendo Switch 2 version of the game received "mixed or average" reviews from critics. Fellow review aggregator OpenCritic assessed that the game received fair approval, being recommended by 59% of critics.

The game received generally positive reviews from critics, who noted it as a noticeable improvement from previous Bluey videogames. CGMagazine praised the lack of complexity, stating "It might not be deep, but it's genuinely delightful". In comparison to Bluey: The Videogame, GameSpot found that Bluey's Quest for the Gold Pen was the superior video game. GamingonPhone stated that "its simplicity and length may not appeal to hardcore gamers seeking deep mechanics, it succeeds brilliantly at its intended goal: creating a joyful, meaningful experience that celebrates creativity, family, and play."
