= Bluey (TV series) =

Australian animated preschool television series

- Genre: Preschool
- Created by: Joe Brumm
- Written by: Joe Brumm
- Directed by: Joe Brumm (series 1); Richard Jeffery (series 2–3)
- Voices of: David McCormack; Melanie Zanetti
- Composer: Joff Bush
- Country of origin: Australia
- Original language: English
- No. of series: 3
- No. of episodes: 154 (list of episodes)

Production
- Executive producers: Michael Carrington (Note: For the Australian Broadcasting Corporation) (series 1); Libbie Doherty (series 2–3); Henrietta Hurford-Jones (Note: For BBC Studios); Charlie Aspinwall; Daley Pearson
- Producer: Sam Moor (Note: Moor was credited as line producer for series 1.)
- Running time: 7 minutes
- Production company: Ludo Studio

Original release
- Network: ABC Kids
- Release: 1 October 2018 – 21 April 2024

Bluey is an Australian animated television series aimed at preschool children, created by Joe Brumm and produced by Ludo Studio in Queensland. It was commissioned by the Australian Broadcasting Corporation and the British Broadcasting Corporation, with BBC Studios holding global distribution and merchandising rights. Bluey premiered on ABC Kids on 1 October 2018. It subsequently made its international debut on Disney Junior in the United States and is available for streaming on Disney+.

The show follows Bluey, an anthropomorphic six-year-old (later seven-year-old) Blue Heeler puppy who is full of energy, imagination, and curiosity about the world. She lives with her father, Bandit; mother, Chilli; and younger sister, Bingo, who regularly joins Bluey on adventures as the pair embark on imaginative play together. Other characters featured each represent a different dog breed. Overarching themes include family life, growing up, and Australian culture. Brisbane, the state capital of Queensland, inspired the show's setting.

Bluey has received consistently high viewership in Australia on both broadcast television and video-on-demand services. It has influenced the development of merchandise, a stage show featuring its characters, and a feature film, The Bluey Movie, scheduled to be released on 6 August 2027. The program has won three Logie Awards for Most Outstanding Children's Program, three AACTA Awards for Best Children's Television Series, an International Emmy Kids Award in 2019, and a Peabody Award in 2024. Critics have praised the show for its modern and positive depiction of family life, constructive parenting messages, and the role of Bandit as a positive father figure.

== Premise ==
Bluey Heeler, the title character, is a six-year-old (later seven-year-old) Blue Heeler puppy who is curious and energetic. She lives with her archaeologist father, Bandit (voiced by David McCormack), her mother Chilli (voiced by Melanie Zanetti), who works part-time in airport security, and her four-year-old (later five-year-old) sister, Bingo. All four members of the family engage in imaginative play together, occasionally involving their neighbours, Labrador Retriever Pat (voiced by Brad Elliot) and his sons Lucky and Chucky, and Chow Chow Wendy (voiced by Beth Durack and Emily Taheny) and her daughter Judo.

Bandit's younger brother Stripe (voiced by Dan Brumm) lives with his wife Trixie (voiced by Myf Warhurst) and their two daughters, opinionated three-year-old Muffin and her baby sister Socks, who over time learns to talk and walk on two legs. The extended Heeler family also includes Bandit and Stripe's older brother Radley (voiced by Patrick Brammall) and his love interest and later wife Frisky (voiced by Claudia O'Doherty), their mother Chris (voiced by Chris Brumm), and their father Bob (voiced by Ian McFadyen and Sam Simmons (Note: Ian McFadyen voices Bob in the series one episode "Grannies".)). Chilli's extended family includes her father Mort (voiced by Laurie Newman) and her sister Brandy (voiced by Rose Byrne).

Bluey's friends and classmates include Coco (a pink Poodle), Chloe (a Dalmatian), Honey (a Beagle), Indy (an Afghan Hound), Mackenzie (a Border Collie), Rusty (an Australian Kelpie), Snickers (a Dachshund), and Winton (an English Bulldog). The children explore the world around them through creative roleplay, overseen by the kind and caring Australian Shepherd teacher Calypso (voiced by Megan Washington). The child characters of Bluey are voiced by children of the program's production crew and are not credited on screen as voice actors.

== Development ==
=== Conception ===
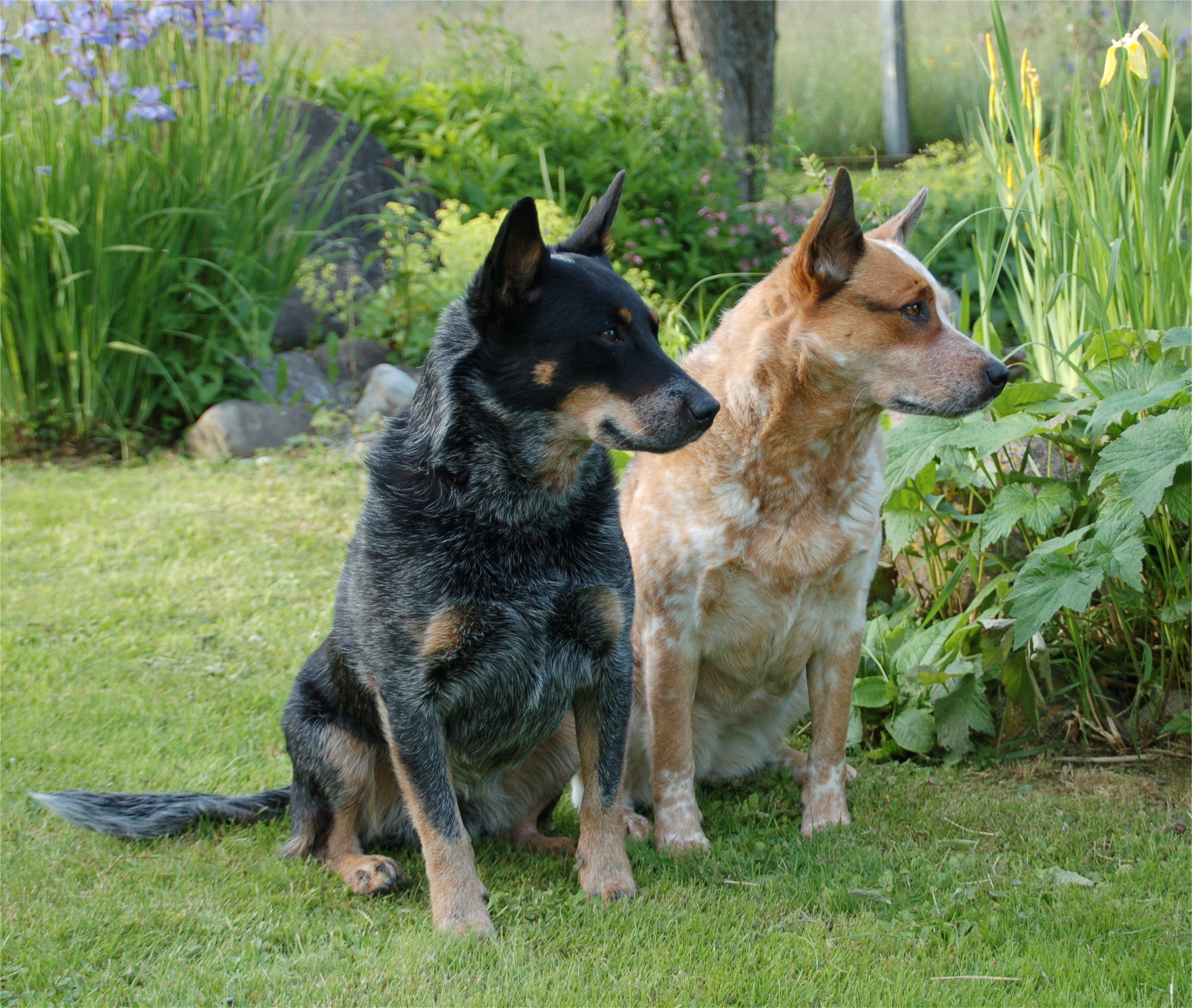
Bluey and her family are modelled after real-life blue and red Australian cattle dogs or heelers.

In July 2017, the Australian Broadcasting Corporation (ABC) and the British Broadcasting Corporation (BBC) co-commissioned Bluey as an animated series for preschool children to be developed by Queensland production company Ludo Studio. The production received funding from Screen Australia and Screen Queensland, with the setting of the series drawing upon the unique semi-tropical Queensland climate. Joe Brumm is the show's creator. He conceived the idea for the show while working on Charlie and Lola with Mark Paterson, who later created the character design for the pilot.

The series was inspired by his experience in raising two daughters. Brumm wanted to depict the importance of children participating in imaginative play, creating the title character Bluey as a cattle dog to give the series an Australian voice. Brumm had previously worked on children's programs in the United Kingdom as a freelance animator and decided to create Bluey as a replica of the program Peppa Pig for an Australian audience. He also drew inspiration from the shows Peanuts and The Simpsons. He conceived the idea in 2016, and produced a one-minute pilot through his company Studio Joho, with a small team in their spare time.

Brumm approached Ludo Studio to develop the series; co-founders Charlie Aspinwall and Daley Pearson pitched the pilot at conferences such as MIPCOM in France. Brumm stated that the first pilot contained some "dangerous" character behaviours which drew the attention of studio executives; this included Bandit pushing Bluey on a swing while playing a game on his smartphone. Pearson expressed that it was difficult to pitch the series as it was not high-concept, but rather "just a show about family and games". Brumm had considered making Bluey an adult-rated version of Peppa Pig featuring the challenges of breastfeeding, but decided to return to the original concept of a children's show after learning about The Letdown (2017–2019).

The studio developed a five-minute animation sample that was pitched at the Asian Animation Summit in Brisbane in 2016, and was thereby noticed by ABC and BBC executives. Michael Carrington of the ABC viewed the presentation and secured $20,000 of funding for the studio to produce a refined, seven-minute pilot. The new pilot was presented at the Asian Animation Summit in late 2017 and later reworked as "The Weekend" (Series 1). The two networks ordered 52 seven-minute episodes of Bluey, with the BBC investing 30 percent of the funding and acquiring the global rights for distribution and merchandising. The series was largely produced in Australia by a local team, many of whom were first-time animators from Brisbane, while animator Mark Paterson worked remotely from Auckland, New Zealand. The program was announced to premiere in Australia on ABC Kids, followed by CBeebies.

=== Production ===
==== Writing ====
"There's no counting in Bluey, there's no learning this or that ... just show 'em playing. It's to show parents that the kids aren't just mucking around. They're learning to play, learning to share ... and generally you can just put your feet up and let 'em do it."

— Joe Brumm, 2019

The stories featured in Bluey depict Bluey and Bingo engaging in imaginative play. Brumm wanted to show that self-directed and unstructured play is natural in shaping children and allowing them to develop. He consulted research based on socio-dramatic play, reading the works of Sara Smilansky and Vivian Paley, who both had backgrounds in early childhood education. The episodes show the parents as guides for their children, who allow them to explore their immediate surroundings independently, giving them opportunities to practise adult roles.

Brumm drew inspiration for scripts from his own experiences in watching his daughters play, which he described was "as natural to them as breathing". The program's scripts show how children can use gameplay to learn lessons and integrate the world of adults into their own; Brumm noticed how his children would recreate interactions such as visits to the doctor, through roleplay. Pearson stated that gameplay represents children's first experiences of collaboration, cooperation, responsibility and emotions such as jealousy.

Brumm discovered the importance of play-based learning after his daughter struggled with formal education, which led him to exclude elements of literacy and numeracy in Bluey and focus on the depiction of life skills. Brumm stated that he wanted the series to depict his experience as a parent rather than aim for children to be explicitly taught something. His creative aims were to make children laugh, and show parents what children can learn while engaged in play.

The characters of Bluey each represent a particular dog breed, some of which are drawn from Brumm's personal life. Brumm had a Blue Heeler named Bluey throughout his childhood, in addition to a Dalmatian named Chloe and an Australian Red Kelpie named Rusty, who was the title character of the series in its early development. Bandit is based on a Blue Heeler belonging to his father's friend. Bandit's career as an archaeologist was inspired by Brumm's older sibling Adam.

Brumm writes the majority of episode scripts, with Aspinwall labelling the series as an "observational" show, depicting Brumm's family life, and producer Sam Moor describing it as "[Brumm's] life on screen"; when producing the pilot, Brumm's daughters were aged between four and six, like Bluey and Bingo. Brumm's process for writing sometimes begins with making notes about his family's experiences; including games his children play and the conflict that arises between them. For this reason, Brumm has described the process as a challenge for other writers on the series. Moor stated that there are few writers besides Brumm, mostly animators already working on the series.

The program was designed to be a co-viewing experience for parents and their children to enjoy together. Brumm described the process of writing each episode as "a chance to make a short film". The conflict and humour in the episodes stems from Bandit's relationship with his daughters. Bluey has been described as "rough and tumble" by Pearson, with both her and Bingo being seen to subvert the stereotypes of female characters, but rather have the characteristics of real puppies. This has led to uninformed viewers questioning if the characters are boys or girls. Pearson has credited the decision of Bluey and Bingo being girls to resemble the real families of Brumm, Aspinwall and McCormack. In relation to the humour of the series, Brumm has stated there is a lot of physical activity and "craziness".

==== Storyboarding and animation ====
Bluey is animated in-house at Ludo Studio in Brisbane, in Fortitude Valley, where approximately 50 people work on the program. Costa Kassab serves as one of the art directors of the series, who has been credited with drawing the locations of the series which are based on real places in Brisbane, including parks and shopping centres. Locations featured in the series have included Queen Street Mall and South Bank, as well as landmarks such as The Big Pelican on the Noosa River. Brumm determines the specific locations which are to be included. Post-production of the series takes place externally in South Brisbane.

Approximately fifteen episodes of the series are developed by the studio at any one time across a range of production stages. After story ideas are conceived, the script-writing process takes place for up to two months. The episodes are then storyboarded by artists, who produce 500 to 800 drawings over three weeks while consulting the writer's script. After the storyboard is finished, a black and white animatic is produced, to which the dialogue recorded independently by voice artists is added. The episodes are then worked on for four weeks by animators, background artists, designers, and layout teams. The entire production team views a near-completed episode of Bluey on a Friday. Pearson stated that over time, the viewings developed into test screenings where members of production would bring their family, friends, and children to watch the episode. The complete production process for an episode takes three to four months. Moor described the program's colour palette as "a vibrant pastel". Bluey is animated using CelAction2D.

During the lockdown period of the COVID-19 pandemic, the production staff of 50 were required to work on the episodes remotely from home. A skeleton crew of three remained working on the series at the studio. After restrictions eased in May 2020, this number increased to 10 and later 20. By 2024, work at the studio returned to normal. A few extra people were hired for "The Sign"—a 28-minute-long episode towards the end of Series 3.

=== Casting ===
The series features David McCormack, from the band Custard, as the voice of Bluey's father, Bandit. He was initially approached to read what he assumed would only be "a couple of lines", but ended up voicing Bandit for the entire pilot. McCormack performs his voice work for the series remotely in Sydney, which is then sent to the production company in Brisbane. He stated that he does not hear any other voice actors or view footage while recording, and that he does not alter his own voice to produce Bandit's dialogue. Melanie Zanetti provides the voice of Bluey's mother, Chilli; she became interested in the series after reading the script for the pilot.

Brumm's mother, Chris Brumm, voices Nana Heeler, while his younger brother, Dan Brumm, voices Uncle Stripe, as well as working as a sound designer on the series. The child characters of the series, including Bluey and Bingo, are voiced by children of the program's production crew and are not credited on screen as voice actors.

=== Music ===
Joff Bush serves as the primary composer of Bluey, composing the theme song and writing half of the soundtrack himself. He leads a group of additional composers, including David Barber. Bush graduated from the Queensland Conservatorium, where he met Pearson, and before Bluey worked on series such as The Family Law and Australian Survivor. Bush has stated that each episode has its own unique musical style, and he likes to become involved in the episodes as they are scripted. Live instruments are regularly played for the recordings. Every episode of Bluey is individually scored, a decision made by Brumm, who was inspired by the original compositions for Charlie and Lola while working on the series in the United Kingdom. Classical music is used as part of the underscore, with pieces such as Beethoven's "Ode to Joy" and Mozart's "Rondo Alla Turca (from Sonata No. 11)" being interpreted by composers. A movement from The Planets by Gustav Holst is prominently featured in "Sleepytime" (Series 2). Megan Washington, who voices Calypso, re-recorded her song "Lazarus Drug" from the album Batflowers (2020) to feature prominently in the ending scene of "The Sign" (Series 3).

=== Future ===
Production on the third series concluded in April 2022. In July 2023, Pearson stated that the production team were taking a short break from making episodes. He denied that the program would end after the third series, but explained that there were no immediate plans for a fourth series. Brumm indicated that the audience response to the long-form episode "The Sign" could influence the future of the series. In December 2024, Brumm announced that he would be taking a hiatus from writing for the show in order to focus on the upcoming feature film.

A collection of shorts titled "Minisodes" were produced before the break in production. These shorts were released throughout 2024; the first collection of these one-to-three minute episodes began airing on ABC Kids on 16 June, and were released on Disney+ on 3 July. The second set of shorts was released in October, and the final group of shorts were released in December. In March 2026, a recorded version of the stage show Bluey's Big Play was released on Disney+, and in May of the same year, ten more "Minisodes" which were previously released online and in Australia, were released on the streaming platform as well.

=== Indigenous language translation ===
A project to present several episodes of Bluey in an Australian Indigenous language took several years to come to fruition, but on 17 June 2026 it was announced that five episodes (Note: "The Creek", "The Beach", "Sleepytime", "Grandad", and "Rug Island"—chosen "because of their connections to family and Country".) had been translated into Yolŋu Matha. Dimathaya Burarrwanga, a founding member of the band King Stingray, voices Bandit, with another musician, Andrew Gurruwiwi, providing the voice of Grandad. Chilli is voiced by Rosie Mununggurr, while several children play the other characters. The episodes were released at the beginning of NAIDOC Week on 5 July 2026 on ABC iview, and they were screened at the Garma Festival in August.

=== Intellectual property rights and breaches ===
According to a 2023 Screen Producers Australia report, Ludo Studio has retained the rights, "including all future production rights, ensuring that they and the creator are included in all future development of Bluey", regardless of the licensed distribution rights to the series.

Concerns have been expressed about the use of the character of Bluey in what political party One Nation (ON) has called "political satire". In 2024, one of their cartoon videos from their Pauline Hanson's Please Explain series showed Bluey driving an SUV over Daniel Andrews, the former Premier of Victoria. The cartoon, called "State of Melbourne", was also released on YouTube. Hugh Marks, ABC managing director, appearing at Senate estimates on 25 October 2026, said that he had sought legal advice and that it was a clear breach of intellectual property, deserving of a cease and desist letter. He added that the use of Bluey in the cartoon was "both shocking and disrespectful to the children of Australia who love that character so much". The ABC is the licensed holder of copyright in Australia, but as Ludo Studio holds the intellectual property rights, the two organisations would need to work together to take legal action.

On 28 October 2026 it was reported that ON had created a colouring book which it handed out to children at the annual agricultural show at Mount Gambier, South Australia, on 23–24 October. As well as unflattering drawings of politicians and other living people, the book included a picture of Bluey and Robert Irwin being held up by a crocodile wielding a knife. A local parent complained and the matter has been escalated.

== Themes ==
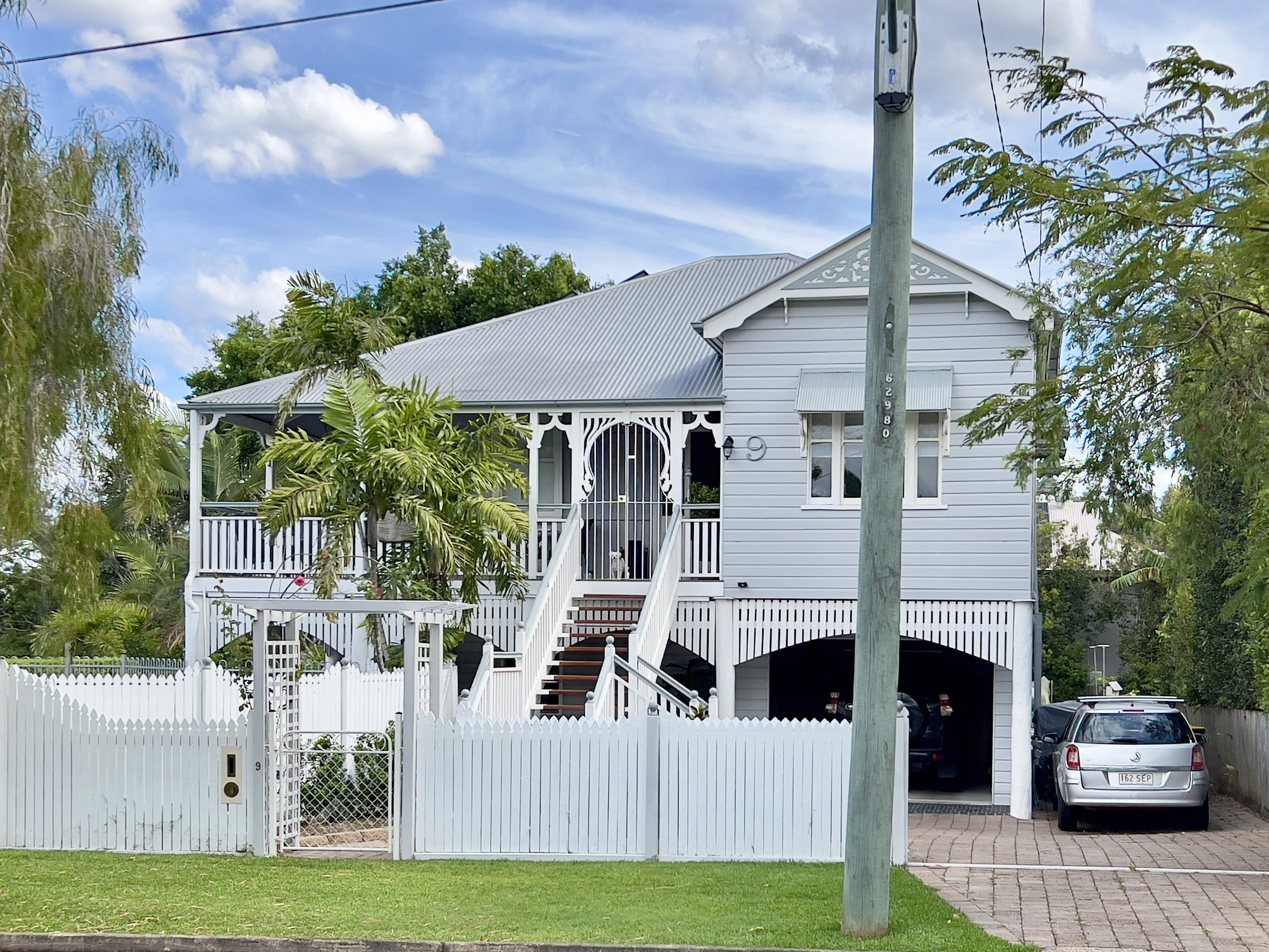
Queenslander residential architecture inspires the designs of animated houses in the series.

A central theme of the series is the influence of a supportive family; this is reflected in the relationships between Bluey, Bingo, Bandit and Chilli. The Heeler family are presented as a nuclear family. Brumm was eager to reflect contemporary parenting practices, with both adults shown to be working parents; Bandit as an archaeologist and Chilli working part-time in airport security. Bethany Hiatt of The West Australian explains that the series depicts the realities of modern-day fatherhood, with Bandit seen regularly doing housework and engaging in imaginative play with his children.

Chilli's role as a mother is explored as she balances both work and family life. Her struggles with newborn motherhood and encounters of competitiveness in a parenting group are depicted through flashbacks of Bluey experiencing significant developmental milestones. Both parents are shown to acknowledge and validate the emotions of their children, such as Bluey's distress after the death of a bird. Bluey and Bingo are shown to navigate their sibling relationship throughout the episodes, learning how to work together, compromise, and resolve conflicts. Episodes detail the family's contemporary domestic lifestyle, with Philippa Chandler of The Guardian describing the series as "social realism".

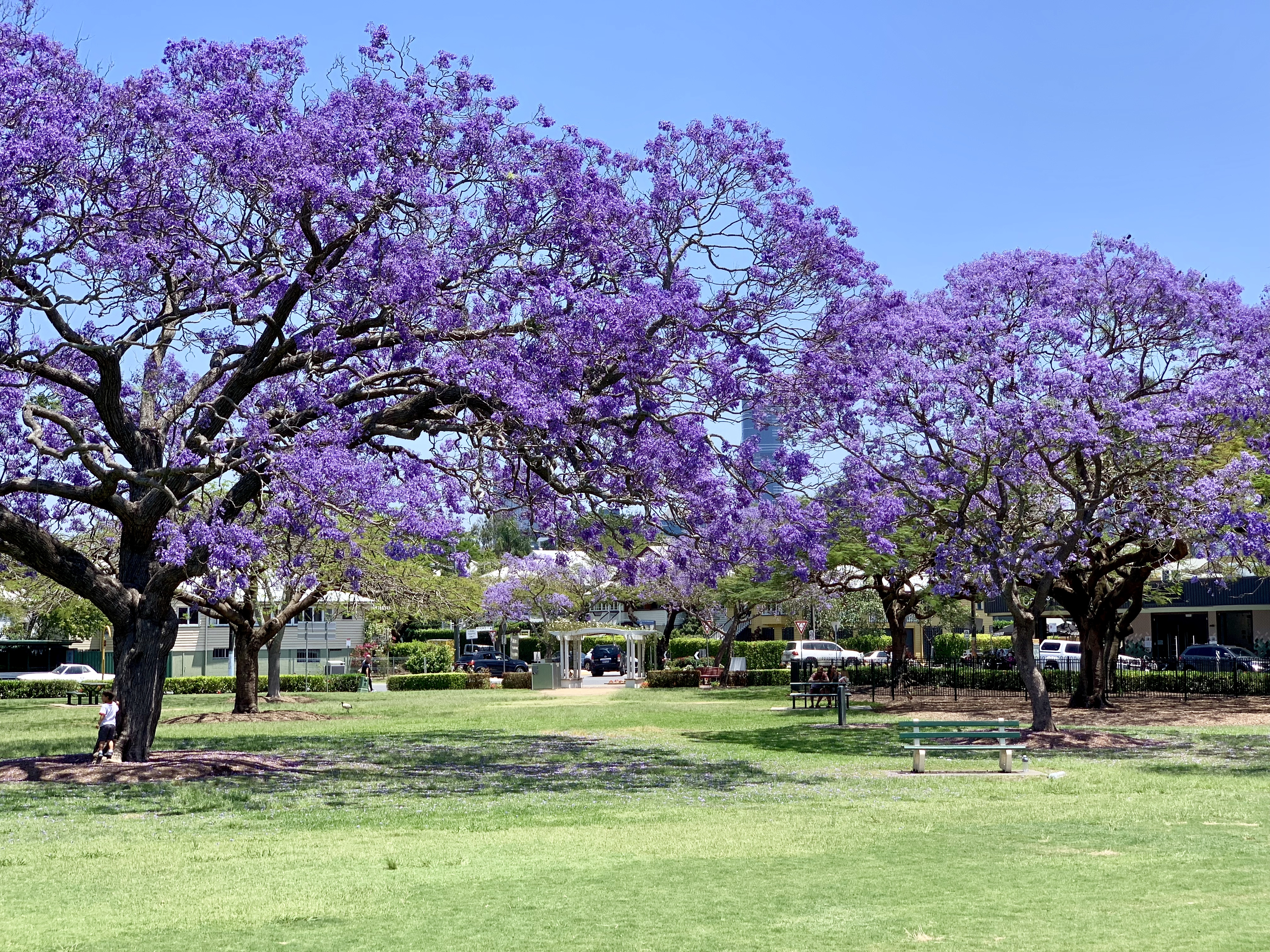
Jacaranda trees are featured in the series as an example of flora in Australia.

The series depicts Australian contemporary culture, and is set in semi-tropical Queensland. The animation of Australian architecture in the series is designed to reflect the typical Queenslander residential designs of Brisbane: high-set suburban dwellings with characteristic verandas, against representations of Brisbane skylines. The characters speak with Australian accents in local and international airings. The series has a focus on the Australian sense of humour with dry wit frequently expressed through the dialogue.

Several episodes detail the exploration of Australia's climate and nature, with characters encountering Australian wildlife such as fruit bats, wallabies, kookaburras and ibises. Flora of Australia are also depicted in the series, including popular introduced species such as poinciana trees and jacaranda trees. The series explores Australian sport through the inclusion of rugby league; the Maroons and the Blues are featured in a depiction of the State of Origin series. However, Brumm has expressed that he did not want to exaggerate the stereotypes of Australia.

The series advocates the importance of play throughout childhood. Bluey and Bingo are the vehicle used to display this theme. The episode "Trampoline" features Bandit imploring Bluey to continue creating new games to play. The siblings engage in imaginative play during "mundane" activities such as going to the supermarket. The parents are shown to engage in the play with their children. Bluey and Bingo engage in imaginative play with their friends, learning lessons such as the importance of following the rules. The characters learn lessons such as the influence of technology, the economy and personal finance through their gameplay. Pearson has stated that the characters experience emotions such as jealousy and regret through their gameplay. He commented that, while there is no antagonist in the series, these emotions form the central conflicts of the program.

The character of Jack is shown to have attention deficit issues; he states that he "can't sit still or remember anything". Upon the online character announcement, parents praised the representation of children with attention deficit issues. Dougie was introduced as a profoundly deaf character who uses Auslan to communicate with his mother in the episode "Turtleboy"; the character is shown signing but it is not the focus of the episode's story. Consultants were involved to authentically animate the Auslan signs, and viewers praised the representation. The episode "Onesies" alludes to the fact that Chilli's sister Brandy cannot have children, addressing the topic of fertility without specifically labelling the reason why. It was also reported that "The Show" subtly approaches pregnancy loss.

== Episodes ==
The first series premiered in Australia on ABC Kids on 1 October 2018, with 26 episodes airing daily throughout October. The following 25 episodes of the series began airing on 1 April 2019. The final episode of the first series, a Christmas special, aired on 12 December 2019. It was reported in March 2019 that production had begun on a second series of 52 episodes; the order was officially announced in May. The second series premiered on 17 March 2020, with the first 26 episodes airing daily, through April. The remaining episodes began airing on 25 October 2020, and were followed by a Christmas special which aired on 1 December 2020, and an Easter special airing on 4 April 2021.

Preliminary discussions for the third series began in April 2020. The series order was made official in October. The third series began airing on 5 September 2021 with a Father's Day-themed special, followed by further episode blocks from 22 November 2021, and 13 June 2022. The series was moved to weekly episodes beginning 9 April 2023; episodes aired Sundays to June. The final episode block of the third series aired on Sundays throughout April 2024, and included a special 28-minute episode titled "The Sign".

Series	Episodes		Originally released	
Series	Episodes		First released	Last released
1	52	26	1 October 2018	26 October 2018
1	52	26	1 April 2019	12 December 2019
2	52	26	17 March 2020	11 April 2020
2	52	26	25 October 2020	4 April 2021
3	50	26	5 September 2021	16 December 2021
3	50	11	13 June 2022	23 June 2022
3	50	10	9 April 2023	11 June 2023
3	50	3	7 April 2024	21 April 2024

== Release ==
=== Broadcast ===
The Walt Disney Company holds the international broadcasting rights to Bluey for both linear television and streaming, having acquired the rights in 2019. The series premiered on the Disney Junior television network in the United States on 9 September 2019 and was later distributed on Disney+ on 22 January 2020 and in the United Kingdom on 1 October 2020. Cartoon Network executives tried but failed to acquire the rights to the series. Despite airing the show overseas, the producers have declined requests to replace the Australian accents of their characters in order to maintain the authenticity of the show.

Disney's test audience of American children liked the accents and understood the humour. As Jane Gould, who was responsible for content strategy at Disney, explained to The New York Times, "Our kids live in a much more global community than the adults do" thanks to the Internet, making it unnecessary to replace the accents when aired in another English-speaking country. The second series debuted on Disney Channel in the United States on 10 July 2020. The distribution deal with Disney originally encompassed the first two series of the program. The third series was acquired in May 2021.

The first half of the third series debuted on Disney+ in licensed territories on 10 August 2022 and later premiered on Disney's television networks. Another group of episodes first aired on 12 July 2023, and further episodes were released on 12 January 2024. Series 3 episodes "Ghostbasket", "The Sign" and "Surprise!" debuted on Disney+ on the same day as their respective Australian premieres in April 2024.

In October 2019, Bluey debuted in New Zealand, airing on TVNZ 2 and streaming on TVNZ OnDemand. The first series made its Australian pay-TV premiere on CBeebies on 4 May 2020. It made its free-to-air television debut on CBeebies in April 2021 in the United Kingdom, Singapore, and Malaysia. The series debuted in the Philippines on TV5, dubbed in Tagalog, in April 2024. Supplementing its availability on the Japanese version of Disney+, the first two seasons of Bluey made their terrestrial network debuts in Japan in October 2024, airing on TV Tokyo with a Japanese dub. In China, Bluey is available on the streaming platform Youku, with voice-over in Mandarin Chinese. Bluey debuted in Wales as Blŵi on the Welsh-language channel S4C on 30 December 2025, dubbed by Tinopolis. A Yolŋu Matha dub of the show was released in June 2026, making it the first time the show was dubbed into an Indigenous Australian language.

=== Home media releases ===
The series was first distributed on DVD in Australia by Universal Sony Pictures Home Entertainment and BBC Studios, with the first two volumes, entitled Magic Xylophone and Other Stories and Horsey Ride and Other Stories released on 30 October 2019. They were followed by further volumes at later dates. In the United States, the first season was released on DVD in two volumes in early 2020. A Blu-ray release containing all episodes from the first, second and third series was released in November 2024. In the United Kingdom, the first volume was released on DVD in October 2021.

=== Diplomatic mission ===
In conjunction to the 50th anniversary of bilateral relations between Vietnam and Australia in 2023, several notable episodes of Bluey were selected to screen in several Vietnamese cities and provinces, including Hanoi, Ho Chi Minh City, Da Nang, and Can Tho. The event was made possible by the Australian Embassy in Vietnam and BBC Studios, which owns the global screening rights.

== Reception ==
=== Critical reception ===
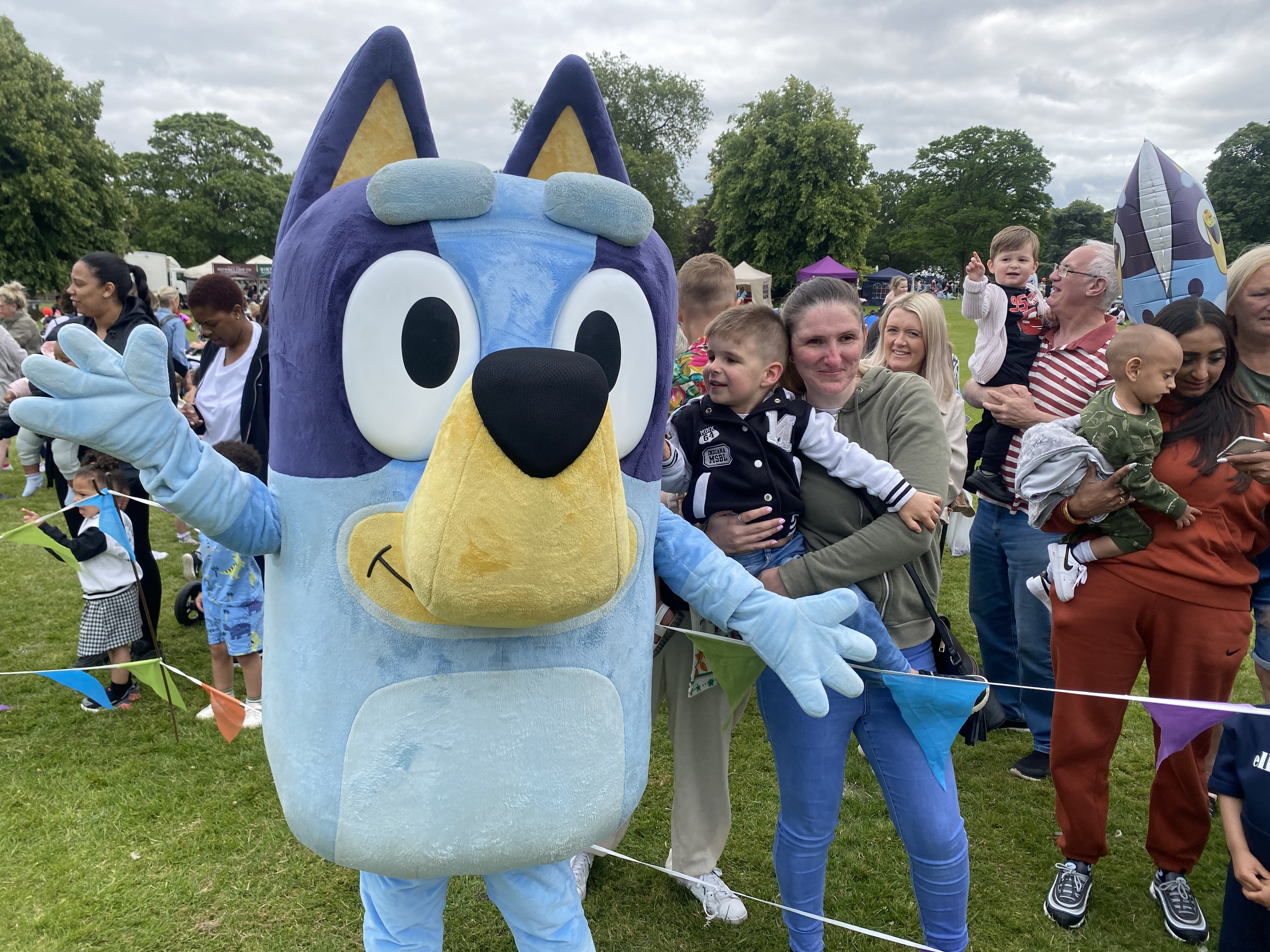
Bluey at a children's festival in Dudley, England, in June 2024

Bluey has been positively reviewed by critics. The series received a seal of approval from Common Sense Media, with reviewer Emily Ashby commending its positive family and social themes. Philippa Chandler of The Guardian praised Bluey for its "sharp script" and depiction of everyday family life, adding that its Queensland background set it apart from other cartoons on television. James Griffiths of The Globe and Mail noted that Bluey appealed not only to young children—its target audience—but also to their parents; this made it stand apart from direct competitors such as Teletubbies (1997–2001, 2015–2018) or A Minecraft Movie (2025), which could leave parents "baffled and slightly concerned" about what their children enjoyed watching. For readers of the parenting blog of The New York Times, Bluey was the best show by far in 2019, with submissions calling it a "very real" depiction of family life or a "tolerable watch for adults" with young children. David Sims of The Atlantic opined that "Bluey is the kind of lively show a toddler anywhere on Earth can understand, but it's also a particular representation of contemporary parenting." Stephanie Convery of The Guardian deemed it "laugh-out-loud funny" thanks to the "quirky behaviour" of the child characters. A number of commentators have compared the passion of some Bluey viewers to that of the fans of Taylor Swift. As Tyler Hilton told The Hollywood Reporter, "Neither are cynical, cheap or playing to baser instincts. They both respect the audience and don't placate."

In 2019, TV Week listed Bluey at number 98 in its list of the 101 greatest Australian television shows of all time. According to this magazine, despite being on air only since 2018, Bluey "stole Australia's hearts faster than any other cartoon character" in what it described as a "cute, funny and modern" series. Junkee put Bluey—which it described as "an absolute delight"—in 14th place on its list of 50 television programs that defined the decade. In a list published by Rolling Stone of the top 100 sitcoms of all time, Bluey ranked 96th, the only Australian series to be featured. The episode "Sleepytime" (Series 2) has been well received, with director Richard Jeffery winning an Australian Directors' Guild Award in 2021, and the episode winning the 2022 Prix Jeunesse International Award in the category of TV – Up to 6 Years Fiction (Children's).

Critics complimented the show for its constructive parenting messages and its depiction of Bandit Heeler as a positive father figure, who is patient, willing to do housework and play with his children, "more emotionally intelligent" than the father from Peppa Pig (2004–present), and an equal partner with his wife, Chilli. This aspect makes Bluey distinct from other shows, such as Peppa Pig, which tend to denigrate the inadequate father. Stephanie Convery of The Guardian commented that while the sisters were accurate depictions of children, the parents did not conform to gender stereotypes. Jennifer McClellan of the USA Today described Bandit as "sarcastic, sympathetic and silly" and Chilli as the "voice of reason" of the family. She further noted how Bluey and Bingo learned to navigate their sibling relationship. Moreover, the show's messages about parenting align with published literature on parental well-being, noting how the show emphasizes the importance of play and learning social skills in children's development. Psychologist Pamela Rutledge praises Bandit and Chilli for having a balanced approach towards parenting, and for listening to their children rather than dismissing their concerns.

The series has also received online praise for its representation of attention deficit issues through the character of Jack, and the inclusion of Auslan (Australian sign language) through Dougie, a profoundly deaf character. Viewers also appreciate the show's sensitive handling of infertility, miscarriage, and divorce. The series three episode Cricket, which aired during the 2023 ICC World Test Championship final, received positive attention from cricket writers.

=== Controversies and censorship ===
The website of the series was criticised for, in the character description of Chilli, suggesting that her return to part-time work prevents her from being involved as a parent unlike other mothers; the description was later altered. A separate incident saw an apology issued by the ABC in August 2020 in relation to the usage of the term "ooga booga" in the episodes "Teasing" and "Flat Pack", which was described as a term with "racial connotations and a problematic history for Indigenous Australians" through a viewer complaint. The ABC claimed that the term had only been intended as "irreverent rhyming slang made up by children", and has stated that it maintains its commitment to addressing discrimination. The two episodes were temporarily removed from rotations before being edited to remove the term, which prompted mixed reactions from viewers. Series 2 episode "Dad Baby" never aired on Disney's outlets. While Disney has not officially disclosed a reason, Polygon speculated that it was withheld due to its depictions of pregnancy and childbirth. It was released on the show's official YouTube account on 2 May 2024. Series 3 episode "Exercise" was criticised on social media due to viewers perceiving a scene as fat-shaming; the episode was later edited to remove the scene.

In 2026, right-wing political party One Nation used a depiction of Bluey in a cartoon showing her driving an SUV into politicians. The ABC requested that One Nation remove the cartoon.

=== Viewership and popularity ===
Bluey has received consistently high viewership on ABC Kids in Australia, becoming the most watched children's program across all channels on broadcast television in 2018 and 2019. In 2019, the series was the most-watched program through time shifting. Despite not being marketed as much as The Mandalorian (2019–present) from the Star Wars franchise or Loki (2021–2023) from Marvel Studios, Bluey quickly rose to the top of the shows available on Disney+ when it premiered on the platform in June 2020. Showrunner Joe Brumm credited the COVID-19 pandemic for helping to boost the popularity of his creation.

The highest-rated episode of the program, "The Sign" (Series 3), premiered on 14 April 2024 to a national television audience of 2,288,000 viewers across two broadcasts. Disney+ indicated that this episode was watched 10.4 million times globally within a week of availability for streaming. Bluey accounted for almost a third of all views on Disney+ in 2024, making it a bright spot as the streaming service was losing subscribers.

In March 2019, Bluey was the most downloaded program in the history of ABC's video on demand and catch up TV service ABC iview, with 21.3 million total episode plays. Within one year of the show's premiere, this figure had risen to 152 million, and by May 2020, there had been 261 million plays of episodes from the first series. The second series had totalled 43 million episode plays by May. By May 2021, episodes from both series had generated over 480 million plays.

According to Nielsen rankings, Bluey supplanted Cocomelon (2018–2024) as the most popular children's program in the United States in 2023. In terms of minutes watched, it was second only to legal drama show Suits (2011–2019). Nielsen data also showed that Bluey never fell out of the top ten most-streamed shows since its debut in the United States, putting in on par with some other well-known and long-running American television series, such as the police procedural NCIS (2002–present), medical drama Grey's Anatomy (2005–present), and family drama and comedy Gilmore Girls (2000–2007; 2016).

By 2024, it became clear that Bluey had commanded a global audience, being sold to 60 countries and dubbed in 20 languages. That year, it became the top show on the CBeebies, the BBC's children's channel. It was also the most-watched television show in the United States in a ranking that included both children's and adults' shows, being streamed for a total of 55.6 billion minutes (106 thousand years), right behind the all-time record of 55.7 billion minutes set by Suits in 2023. "The Sign" was a major factor in the overall success of Bluey in 2024. According to Nielsen data, Bluey was the most watched show in the U.S. on all streaming platforms of 2025.

Despite being made for preschool children, Bluey has also been popular among parents, as well as teenagers and adults without children. It has garnered a substantial following on social media platforms, such as Facebook, Reddit, and especially TikTok. Some adults watch Bluey to relieve stress. For many Millennials and members of Generation Z, the show alleviates and heals the psychological wounds from their childhoods.

=== Awards and nominations ===
List of awards and nominations received by Bluey
Award	Year	Recipient(s) and nominee(s)	Category	Result	Ref.
AACTA Awards	2019	Bluey	Best Children's Program	Won	
AACTA Awards	2020	Bluey	Best Children's Program	Won	
AACTA Awards	2021	Bluey	Best Children's Program	Won	
AACTA Awards	2022	Bluey	Best Children's Program	Won	
AACTA Awards	2023	Bluey	Best Children's Program	Won	
AACTA Awards	2024	Bluey	Best Children's Program	Won	
AACTA Awards	2024	Joff Bush, Daniel O'Brien, Jazz Darcy (for Bluey – "The Sign")	Best Original Music Score in Television	Won	
AACTA Awards	2024	Dan Brumm (for Bluey – "The Sign")	Best Sound in Television	Nominated	
Anugerah Penyiaran Ramah Anak	2025	Bluey (for "The Doctor")	Foreign Animation	Won	
APRA Screen Music Awards	2019	Joff Bush (for "Teasing")	Best Music for Children's Television	Nominated	
APRA Screen Music Awards	2020	Joff Bush (for "Flat Pack")	Best Music for Children's Television	Nominated	
APRA Screen Music Awards	2021	Joff Bush	Best Music for Children's Programming	Won	
APRA Screen Music Awards	2021	Bluey: The Album	Best Soundtrack Album	Won	
APRA Screen Music Awards	2022	Joff Bush	Most Performed Screen Composer – Overseas	Nominated	
APRA Screen Music Awards	2023	Joff Bush	Most Performed Screen Composer – Overseas	Won	
APRA Screen Music Awards	2024	Joff Bush, Jazz D'Arcy, Daniel O'Brien, Joe Twist (for "The Sign")	Best Music for Children's Programming	Won	
ARIA Music Awards	2021	Bluey: The Album	Best Children's Album	Won	
ARIA Music Awards	2024	Dance Mode!	Best Children's Album	Won	
ARIA Music Awards	2026	Up Here (The Orchestral Album)	Best Children's Album	Won	
Asian Academy Creative Awards	2020	Bluey	Best Preschool Programme	Won	
Asian Academy Creative Awards	2022	Bluey (for "Rain" and "Fairytale")	Best Preschool Programme	Won	
Australian Book Industry Awards	2020	Bluey (for "The Beach", Penguin)	Children's Picture Book of the Year (Ages 0–6)	Won	
Australian Book Industry Awards	2020	Bluey (for "The Beach", Penguin)	Book of the Year	Won	
Australian Book Industry Awards	2021	Bluey (for "The Creek", Penguin)	Children's Picture Book of the Year (Ages 0–6)	Nominated	
Australian Directors' Guild Awards	2021	Richard Jeffery (for "Sleepytime")	Best Direction in a Children's TV or SVOD Drama Program Episode	Won	
Australian Toy Association	2020	Bluey (Moose Toys)	Preschool License of the Year	Won	
BAFTA Children & Young People Awards	2022	Bluey	International	Won	
Banff World Media Festival Rockie Awards	2021	Bluey	Animation: Preschool (0–4)	Won	
Critics' Choice Television Awards	2022	Bluey	Best Animated Series	Nominated	
Critics' Choice Television Awards	2023	Bluey	Best Animated Series	Nominated	
Critics' Choice Television Awards	2024	Bluey	Best Animated Series	Nominated	
Critics' Choice Television Awards	2025	Bluey	Best Animated Series	Nominated	
International Emmy Kids Awards	2019	Bluey	Kids: Preschool	Won	
Kidscreen Awards	2021	Bluey	Preschool Programming – Best Animated Series	Won	
Kidscreen Awards	2021	Bluey	Creative Talent – Best Directing	Won	
Kidscreen Awards	2021	Bluey	Creative Talent – Best Writing	Won	
Kidscreen Awards	2021	Bluey	Creative Talent – Best Music	Won	
Kidscreen Awards	2023	Bluey (for Series 3)	Preschool Programming – Best Animated Series	Won	
Logie Awards	2019	Bluey	Most Outstanding Children's Program	Won	
Logie Awards	2022	Bluey	Most Outstanding Children's Program	Won	
Logie Awards	2023	Bluey	Most Outstanding Children's Program	Nominated	
Logie Awards	2024	Bluey	Best Children's Program	Won	
Logie Awards	2025	Bluey	Best Children's Program	Won	
Peabody Awards	2024	Bluey	Children's & Youth	Won	
Prix Jeunesse International Awards	2020	Bluey	TV – Up to 6 Years Fiction (Children's)	Nominated	
Prix Jeunesse International Awards	2022	Bluey (for "Sleepytime")	TV – Up to 6 Years Fiction (Children's)	Won	
Screen Producers Australia Awards	2019	Bluey	Animated Series Production of the Year	Won	
Screen Producers Australia Awards	2019	Bluey	Screen Business Export of the Year	Won (Tied) (Note: Bluey was tied with Animal Kingdom.)	
Screen Producers Australia Awards	2022	Bluey (for Series 2)	Children's Series Production of the Year	Won	
Television Critics Association Awards	2021	Bluey	Outstanding Achievement in Children's Programming	Nominated	
Television Critics Association Awards	2023	Bluey	Outstanding Achievement in Children's Programming	Won	
Television Critics Association Awards	2024	Bluey	Outstanding Achievement in Children's Programming	Won	
Television Critics Association Awards	2025	Bluey: Minisodes	Outstanding Achievement in Children's Programming	Nominated	
TV Blackbox Awards	2021	Bluey	Most Popular Children's Show	Won	
TV Tonight Awards	2019	Bluey	Best Kid's Show	Won	
TV Tonight Awards	2020	Bluey	Best Kid's Show	Won	
TV Tonight Awards	2021	Bluey	Best Kid's Show	Won	
TV Tonight Awards	2022	Bluey	Best Kid's Show	Won	
TV Tonight Awards	2023	Bluey	Best Kid's Show	Won	

== Other media ==
=== Books ===
In April 2019, BBC Studios entered a partnership with Penguin Random House Australia with a deal to publish three Bluey books before the end of 2019. The Beach, Fruit Bat, and a sticker activity book entitled Time to Play, were released on 5 November 2019. All three books were recognised as the highest-selling releases in the weekly Australian book charts of November 2019, and had sold a combined total of 350,000 copies by January 2020. The combined sales of the first nine books reached 1 million in June 2020; and the figure for all books had reached 5 million by October 2022. In September 2020, the partnership with Penguin Random House was expanded to include global distribution rights, allowing the books to be released in the United States and the United Kingdom.

=== Merchandise ===
Moose Toys was named as the global toy partner for Bluey in June 2019; the company announced that toys would be released in Australia by the end of 2019, and later in the United States. Plush character toys of Bluey and Bingo were released in November, and a character figurine set was released in December. The plush Bluey topped the Toys "R" Us release chart of Christmas 2019, while the demand for the plush Bingo exceeded the number of toys being supplied to stores. By December, over 100,000 plush character toys had been sold in Australia. The toy line was launched in the United States in June 2020.

In January 2020, Bluey partnered with Bonds to release a clothing range for children, including pyjamas and socks featuring character designs. A more comprehensive clothing range was made available at Australian retailers in March, including clothing, sleepwear and underwear. A range of adult pyjamas were released in May 2020 through Peter Alexander stores, which became the fastest selling collection in the retailer's history. Bauer Media Group released the first issue of a monthly Bluey magazine in May. A lifestyle range of children's furniture was released in June 2020. In October 2024, a collaboration with Crocs was announced. In January 2025, a partnership with Lego was announced. Encompassing the Duplo and +4 ranges, the Bluey sets were released in June 2025. A collaboration with Funko was announced in January 2026.

=== Video games ===
The mobile game Bluey: Let's Play! was released by Budge Studios on 15 August 2023 on iOS and Android. The game received attention for its use of a subscription model. The release of the aforementioned Lego Bluey sets was accompanied by a mobile game that was released on iOS and Android on 14 August 2025; it also uses a subscription model.

A console game, titled Bluey: The Videogame, was released on 17 November 2023 for Windows, PlayStation 4, PlayStation 5, Nintendo Switch, Xbox One, and Xbox Series X and Series S. The game, which was developed by Artax Games and published by Outright Games, is an interactive sandbox game with an original story. The voice actors and music composer Joff Bush return as their respective roles in the game. The title was met with mixed reviews from critics.

Bluey: Bust-a-Move was released on 7 October 2025 for the Nex Playground via the Play Pass subscription. Developed by Nex, the company behind Nex Playground, and BBC Studios, it utilizes the console's full motion control capabilities for minigames.

Bluey's Quest for the Gold Pen was developed by Australian developer Halfbrick Studios. It features an original story written by Joe Brumm, with composer Joff Bush returning again to compose original music for the title. Brumm worked on Quest for the Gold Pen in tandem with the forthcoming The Bluey Movie. Quest for the Gold Pen was released on 11 December 2025 on Apple's App Store for iOS, iPadOS, and macOS, the Google Play Store for Android on 10 January 2026, and Microsoft Windows, PlayStation 5, Nintendo Switch, Nintendo Switch 2, and Xbox Series X and S forthcoming on 28 May 2026. The iOS and Android versions of the title feature a free demo, with a one-time payment to unlock the full game. Quest for the Gold Pen received generally positive reviews from critics, who noted it as a noticeable improvement from Bluey: Let's Play!, Lego Bluey, and Bluey: The Videogame.

Gameloft Brisbane developed the Unreal Engine 5-powered title Bluey's Happy Snaps, which was revealed at the 2026 Xbox Partner Preview. The game features numerous locations from the show; its photography-based gameplay loop is similar to Pokémon Snap (1999) but with activities other than photography and educational elements. It was released on Nintendo Switch and Switch 2, PlayStation 4, PlayStation 5, Xbox One, Xbox Series X and S, and Windows on 15 October 2026.

==== Collaborations ====
Ubisoft has collaborated with BBC Studios to bring Bluey soundtracks to their games. The first was a track titled "Bluey Medley" being added to Just Dance 2026 Edition, which was released on 14 October 2025 for Nintendo Switch, PlayStation 5, and Xbox Series X and S. Here, players can follow the dance moves for the song, shown by Bluey and Bingo. The Instrument Parade version of the Bluey Theme Tune was added to Rocksmith+ in October.

A Minecraft: Bedrock Edition map was released on the in-game Marketplace on 5 February 2026.

=== Stage show ===
A live stage show developed in 2019, titled Bluey's Big Play, toured in fifty theatres around Australia and featured the characters from the series. The tour was initially scheduled to begin in May 2020, but was delayed due to restrictions relating to the COVID-19 pandemic. After eased restrictions, two preview performances were held at the Canberra Theatre Centre in January 2021 before further shows across the country. Bluey's Big Play also toured the United States, debuting at the Hulu Theater at Madison Square Garden in November 2022. The play debuted in the United Kingdom and Ireland in December 2023, and continues to expand worldwide. An encore season of the production in Australia commenced in Brisbane in December 2023. A pre-recorded version of the play was released on ABC iview on 20 April 2025, and on Disney+ on 16 March 2026.

=== Feature film ===
Ahead of the release of the long-form episode "The Sign" in April 2024, Moor stated that it was "not the end for Bluey", while Pearson expressed interest in creating a feature film based on the series. In December 2024, BBC Studios and The Walt Disney Company announced that The Bluey Movie would be released theatrically in 2027 by Walt Disney Studios Motion Pictures. The feature film will see the series' voice cast and crew returning, including Brumm returning as writer and director for the film. The film is a joint collaboration between Disney, BBC Studios and Ludo Studio; with Disney handling theatrical and streaming rights, BBC Studios handling financing and licensing rights, and Ludo Studio producing the feature. The film is set to continue the events of the show. Australian animation studio Cosmic Dino Studio will provide the computer animation. The Bluey Movie is scheduled to be released in theaters on 6 August 2027. A teaser trailer debuted at the D23 fan event on 14 August 2026.

=== Theme parks ===
A tourist attraction titled Bluey's World was developed at Northshore Pavilion in Hamilton, Queensland; it opened on 7 November 2024 and launched on 13 November 2024. The interactive attraction features an original story and replicates settings from the series on a life-size 4,000 square-metre site. Bluey is projected to contribute AU$16 million to the local economy of Brisbane in 2025.

A Bluey section opened at CBeebies Land at Alton Towers in 2024. A Bluey rollercoaster, titled Bluey the Ride: Here Come the Grannies!, opened on 28 March 2026.

=== Music releases ===
==== Soundtrack albums and singles ====
The music for Bluey is licensed by Universal Music Publishing on behalf of BBC Worldwide Music Publishing. The first soundtrack for the series by Bush, Bluey: The Album, was released on 22 January 2021. The second soundtrack, Dance Mode!, was released on 21 April 2023, and the third soundtrack, Rug Island, was released on 25 October 2024. A fourth album, Up Here, was released on 27 March 2026. The album features songs from the series played for the first time with a full symphony orchestra.

==== Albums ====
Title	Details	Peak chart positions				
Title	Details	AUS	SCO	UK	UK sales	US Top Album Sales
Bluey: The Album	Released: 22 January 2021; Label: Demon Music Group (DEMREC929) / Crimson Records (CRIMCD689); Formats: CD, LP, digital download	1	55	—	35	92
Dance Mode!	Released: 21 April 2023; Label: Demon (DEMREC1100) / Crimson (CRIMCD699); Formats: CD, LP, digital download	7	18	87	13	51
Rug Island	Released: 25 October 2024; Label: Demon (DEMREC1255) / Crimson (CRIMCD701); Formats: CD, LP, cassette, digital download, streaming	82	69	—	47	—
Up Here	Released: 27 March 2026; Label: Demon (DEMREC1339) / Crimson (CRIMCD703); Formats: CD, LP, cassette, digital download, streaming	31	—	—	92	—

Excluding individual releases from certain albums, three singles featuring Bush's music have been released. "Rug Island" was released in 2024 as part of Record Store Day. "Burger Dog" was made available on 12 April 2025 as part of Record Store Day. "Verandah Santa" was released on 7 November 2025, based on the episode of the same name.

==== Charted and certified singles ====
List of charted and singles, with selected chart positions
Title	Year	Chart positions	Certification	Album
Title	Year	UK physical	Certification	Album
"Bluey Theme Tune"	2020	—	ARIA: Platinum; BPI: Silver	Bluey: The Album
"Dance Mode"	2023	—	ARIA: Gold	Dance Mode
"Rug Island"	2024	12		Rug Island
"Burger Dog"	2025	14		Non-album single
"Verandah Santa"	2025	8		Verandah Santa EP

==== Reception and awards ====
Bluey: The Album debuted at number one on the ARIA Albums Chart, and became the first children's album to reach the top of the charts in Australia. It won Best Children's Album at the 2021 ARIA Music Awards, and won the 2021 APRA Award for Best Soundtrack Album.

For his work on the Bluey soundtrack, Bush has been nominated for several APRA Screen Music Awards: his first came in 2019 for the soundtrack of "Teasing" (Series 1) and in 2020 for "Flat Pack" (Series 2). He was nominated for the APRA Award for Most Performed Screen Composer – Overseas in 2022, and won the award in 2023. The show's score won Best Music for Children's Programming in 2021 and in 2024, the latter for the episode "The Sign".

=== Other ===
The stage for "Bluey's Best Day Ever!" at Disneyland in California

Brand Finance estimated the net worth of the entire Bluey franchise to be around US$2 billion.

A balloon of the Bluey character appeared at Macy's Thanksgiving Day Parade in November 2022, and returned for the 2023, 2024, 2025 and 2026 parades. On 19 December 2024, the Walt Disney Company announced that characters from the show would appear at various Disney experiences, including the Disneyland Resort in California, the Walt Disney World Resort in Florida, and Disney Cruise Line ships originating from Australia and New Zealand. The experiences include "Bluey's Best Day Ever!" at Disneyland in California, "Bluey's Wild World" at Disney's Animal Kingdom in Florida, and the "Wakey Wakey" and "Pyjama Party" gatherings on the Disney Dream and Disney Wish cruise ships. This makes Bluey the first non-Disney-owned children's show to feature in Disney theme parks.

A companion podcast produced by the ABC entitled Behind Bluey was first released on 10 April 2023, in which Brumm and other creatives discuss the production of the series and its latest episodes. This podcast covers the 2023 batch of series three episodes. The characters Bluey, Chilli and Bingo made cameo appearances in The Simpsons short May the 12th Be with You, released on Disney+ in May 2024 to celebrate Star Wars Day and Mother's Day.

Commemorative birth certificates featuring Bluey artwork were made available to Queensland residents from March 2020. Commemorative $1 coins featuring designs of Bluey and the Heeler family were released by the Royal Australian Mint in June 2024. These coins were uncirculated, with only 30,000 of each being minted, and could only be purchased directly from the Mint or their authorised distributors.

On 12 July 2024, New South Wales Police Force received a report that 63,000 of a separate set of unreleased Bluey-themed Royal Australian Mint coins, which were selling at the time for 10 times their face value at $600,000 in total, had been stolen, and began an investigation into the theft codenamed Strike Force Bandit. On 31 July, they seized 189 of the coins from a legitimate collector who had innocently purchased them, and on 7 August recovered 1,000 of the coins and arrested a 47-year-old man, charging him with three counts of breaking and entering. A second man was arrested on 20 August, and on 30 October police recovered 40,061 of the coins, still in their original bags, from a self-storage business in Wentworthville, arresting an additional 27-year-old woman who had acted as a getaway driver.

In November 2025, Bluey was parodied in the South Park episode "Sora Not Sorry", in which she testified on how the use of artificial intelligence to generate videos by Butters Stotch, Kyle Broflovski, and Kenny McCormick affected her.

In November 2026, Qantas launched a collaboration that saw imagery from the show appear on their aircraft: initially launching on a QantasLink De Havilland Canada Dash 8-400 and Qantas Freight Airbus A321, the latter marking the launch of a route that originates from Manila, Philippines to Brisbane, a plane featuring Bluey characters, intended to serve international routes, will launch on the Airbus A380 in January 2027. Additionally, merchandise will be made available on Qantas' routes, and Qantas lounges will receive Bluey-inspired makeovers beginning in 2027.
