= Melanie Zanetti =

Australian actress (b. 1985)

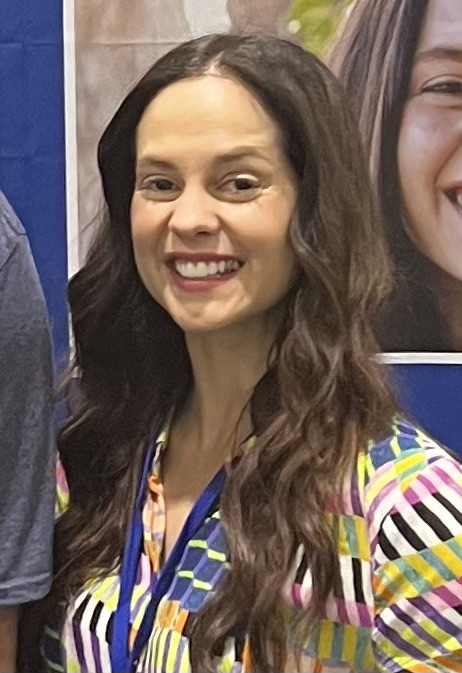
- Zanetti at SacAnime in 2024
- Born: 20 March 1985 (age 41); Brisbane, Queensland, Australia
- Education: University of Southern Queensland
- Occupations: Actress; voice actress
- Years active: 2007–present
- Known for: Bluey

Melanie Zanetti (born 20 March 1985) is an Australian actress. She is best known as the voice of Chilli Heeler in the critically acclaimed animated television program Bluey (2018–present). She has also portrayed Charlotte Ingram in the horror film Raven's Hollow (2022), and Julia Mitchell in the erotic romance film series Gabriel's Inferno and its sequel Gabriel's Rapture (2020–2021).

== Early life ==
Zanetti was born in 1985 in Brisbane, Queensland, and grew up with five siblings.

== Career ==
She graduated from the University of Southern Queensland in 2007 with a Bachelor of Theatre Arts. After graduation, she started working as a stage actress. She appeared on stage for the Queensland Theatre Company in several plays, including as Eliza Doolittle in Pygmalion (2011), as Juliet in Romeo and Juliet (2012), as Catherine Earnshaw/Cathy Linton in a stage adaptation of Wuthering Heights (2014), as Laura/Eliza Wishart in Kate Mulvany's adaptation of the novel Jasper Jones (2018), and as Lea in the premiere of Joanna Murray-Smith's L'Appartement (2019). Her portrayal of Eliza Doolittle in Pygmalion earned her a Matilda Award in 2011.

She subsequently transitioned voice-over, film, and television, relocating to Los Angeles, where she has been cast in various roles.

Since 2018, Zanetti has been the voice of Chilli Heeler, the mother of the titular character and her sister, Bingo, in the popular Australian television series for preschool children Bluey, which has received Peabody and Emmy awards. She was given the role three months after submitting her voice-over. She will reprise her role in the upcoming feature-length film, The Bluey Movie, set to release in 2027. Cast members of the show recorded their voices separately. Zanetti did so remotely as well, while working on her other projects in different countries. On November 11, 2022, Zanetti and co-star Dave McCormack appeared on The Tonight Show Starring Jimmy Fallon to promote Bluey. They told Fallon that they had only met two days prior.

In 2019, Zanetti was cast as the artless university student Julia Mitchell by producer Tosca Musk for the Gabriel's Inferno franchise on Passionflix, an adaptation of a series of best-selling erotic romance novels by Sylvain Reynard. In 2022, she portrayed Charlotte Ingram in the Edgar Allan Poe biographic horror film Raven's Hollow.

In 2024, Zanetti was chosen to be the voice of the Brisbane Metro.

== Filmography ==
=== Film ===
Year	Title	Role
2013	Battle of the Damned	Jude
2015	The Leisure Class	Carolyn
2020	Gabriel's Inferno: Part One	Julia Mitchell
2020	Gabriel's Inferno: Part Two	Julia Mitchell
2020	Love and Monsters	Mav1s and Kala
2020	Gabriel's Inferno: Part Three	Julia Mitchell
2021	Gabriel's Rapture: Part One	Julia Mitchell
2022	Gabriel's Rapture: Part Two	Julia Mitchell
2022	Gabriel's Rapture: Part Three	Julia Mitchell
2022	Raven's Hollow	Charlotte Ingram
2023	Gabriel's Redemption: Part One	Julia Mitchell
2023	Gabriel's Redemption: Part Two	Julia Mitchell
2023	Head Count	Jo
2023	Gabriel's Redemption: Part Three	Julia Mitchell
2027	The Bluey Movie	Chilli Heeler

=== Television ===
Year	Title	Role	Notes
2008	The Strip	Zoe de Luca	1 episode
2009	East of Everything	Anna	1 episode
2017	The Family Law	Doctor Lee	1 episode
2018	Hot Valley Nights	Zowie Brooks	1 episode
2018	Tidelands	Young Genoveva	2 episodes
2018	The Bureau of Magical Things	Orla	12 episodes
2018–present	Bluey	Chilli Heeler	Main cast
2020	The End	Edie Henley	3 episodes
2021	Young Rock	Stephanie	2 episodes
2024	The Ren & Stimpy Show	Tiffani	1 episode
2025	Darby and Joan	Arianna Malgeri	1 episode

=== Video games ===
Year	Title	Role
2023	Bluey: The Videogame	Chilli Heeler
