= Bandit Heeler =

Fictional character from Bluey

- Bluey character
- Bandit as he appears in the series
- First appearance: "Magic Xylophone" (2018)
- Created by: Joe Brumm
- Voiced by: David McCormack

In-universe information
- Full name: Bandit Custard Heeler
- Species: Australian Cattle Dog (Blue Heeler)
- Gender: Male
- Occupation: Archaeologist
- Family: Bob Heeler (father); Chris Heeler (mother); Radley Heeler (older brother); Stripe Heeler (younger brother)
- Spouse: Chilli Heeler
- Children: Bluey Heeler (elder daughter); Bingo Heeler (younger daughter)
- Relatives: Frisky Heeler (sister-in-law); Trixie Heeler (sister-in-law); Muffin Heeler (niece); Socks Heeler (niece); Mort Cattle (father-in-law); Chilli's Mum (mother-in-law, deceased); Brandy Cattle (sister-in-law); Unnamed future grandchild
- Home: Brisbane, Queensland

Bandit Custard Heeler (born 25 October 1978) is a main character in the Australian preschool animated television series Bluey, created by Joe Brumm. Employed as an archaeologist, he enjoys playing with his daughters, Bluey and Bingo, and takes seriously any role he is assigned in a game they devise despite often being seen as reluctant to play along. He often teaches life lessons to his daughters while he plays with them, but this strains his public relationship with them in some episodes. Bandit has been acclaimed as a positive father figure by many parents and critics.

== Character biography ==
Bandit Custard Heeler was born on 25 October 1978. He is the younger brother of Radley Heeler and the older brother of Stripe Heeler, all sons of Bob and Chris Heeler. He claims that he first met his wife Chilli while on holiday as a child, but Chilli has no memory of this meeting and believes that she and Bandit first met at a party in London.

Bandit and Chilli's first child, Bluey, was born at some later time; their second child, Bingo, was born two years after Bluey. At an unknown point, Bandit and Chilli had a miscarriage.

Years later, Bandit received a job offer that would pay more but require him and his family to move away from Queensland. Believing this would allow him to give his daughters a better life, he put the family's house up for sale. Eventually he realised that his family did not want to move, and having been told the buyers pulled out, changed his mind and withdrew the house from sale.

== Character highlights ==
Much of the series' humour revolves around his relationship with his daughters, whom he continually implores to come up with new games to play with him. He enjoys watching cricket and playing squash and touch football.

He has a habit of making "dad jokes" in front of his children. He often is seen reading the newspaper and has a habit of using child-friendly expletives, most of which relate to food. He is also frequently seen doing housework and has a doctorate in archaeology. (Note: Bandit's description on the official website for the short "Archaeology" lists him as "Dr. Bandit Heeler," and he is referred to as such in the short before giving a presentation related to the field.)

== Development ==
Bandit was based on Brumm's own life; he modeled the character after a Blue Heeler owned by a friend of his father, and, as with the character, was the middle child in his family tree. The character's occupation was partly influenced by one of his brothers, Adam, who was an archeologist in his own right, and had been involved in the discovery of fossilised remains of Homo floresiensis, which he nicknamed "The Hobbit" at a Queensland university. The Heelers, including Bandit, are presented as a nuclear family, with him serving as one of the show's two working parents (his wife Chilli is employed as an airport security guard). Bandit's middle name, Custard, originates from the band of the same name, of which his voice actor David McCormack is a part of.

=== Voice ===
In all English dubs of the series, Bandit is voiced by Australian performer/musician David McCormack, who was initially approached to read what he assumed would be merely "a couple of lines", through his Sonar Sounds studio, only to voice the character for the entirety of the pilot and subsequently throughout the series. McCormack, who was raised in Brisbane (where Bluey is based), is a noted alternative rock musician and soundtrack composer for a number of Australian Broadcasting Corporation shows, including Redfern Now. McCormack performs his voice work for the series remotely in Sydney, and his voice recordings are then sent to the production company in Brisbane. He does not hear any other voice actors or view footage while recording, and does not alter his own voice to produce Bandit's dialogue.

A project to present five episodes (Note: "The Creek", "The Beach", "Sleepytime", "Grandad", and "Rug Island" - chosen "because of their connections to family and Country".) of Bluey in an Australian Indigenous language, Yolŋu Matha, was announced to be complete on 17 June 2026. Dimathaya Burarrwanga, a founding member of the band King Stingray, voices Bandit in the episodes, which were released at the beginning of NAIDOC Week on 5 July 2026 on ABC iview and screened at the Garma Festival in August 2026.

== Appearances ==
Bandit has appeared in most of the episodes of Bluey that have aired during its run, and has appeared in most merchandise related to the series. He was the subject of three books: My Dad Is Awesome, The Big Blue Guy's Book of Dad Goals, and an entry in the Bluey: Little Library series. He also appears in the stage show Bluey's Big Play, as well as Bluey: The Videogame and Bluey's Quest for the Gold Pen.

== Reception ==
Bandit has been praised as a positive father figure and commended for his patient nature, openness in demonstrating his love for his wife and daughters, his willingness to help out with housework, and the frequency with which he engages in play with his children. Jennifer McClellan of USA Today described Bandit as "sarcastic, sympathetic and silly". Philippa Chandler of The Guardian described the character as "laconic, playful and certainly more emotionally intelligent than, say, Peppa Pig’s hapless dad". Doug Hendrie of The Sydney Morning Herald claimed that Bandit was designed to improve Australian dads. Amanda Hess, writing for The New York Times, opined that Bandit is "not only a good father — he is a fantasy, one crafted to appeal to adults as much as to children." Writing for The Conversation, Kate Cantrell and David Burton criticized the character for occasionally bullying the children and acting like a larrikin.
