= Dance Mode! =

Soundtrack album by Joff Bush
- Released: 21 April 2023
- Recorded: 2022
- Genre: Soundtrack
- Length: 42:25
- Label: Demon
- Producers: Joff Bush; Marly Lüske; Craig Parry; Steve Peach; Jazz D'Arcy; Pluto Jonze

Joff Bush chronology
Bluey: The Album (2021)	Dance Mode! (2023)	Rug Island (2024)

Singles from Dance Mode!
- 1. "Dance Mode" Released: 27 January 2023; 2. "The BeeeeeOOP Walk" Released: 24 February 2023; 3. "Rain (Boldly in the Pretend)" Released: 24 March 2023

Dance Mode! is the second soundtrack album of the Australian animated television series Bluey, which was released on 21 April 2023 by Demon Records. Most of the soundtrack's music was composed and performed by Joff Bush, the composer for the television program, alongside a team of musicians.

The soundtrack was released through Demon Music Group, a subdivision of BBC Studios, who hold global rights to release the show's music. The first single, "Dance Mode", was released on 27 January 2023.

At the 2024 ARIA Music Awards, the album won Best Children's Album.

== Background and composition ==
Joff Bush serves as the primary composer of Bluey, writing half of the television show's score himself and leading a group of additional composers, including David Barber. Bush graduated from the Queensland Conservatorium, where he met executive producer Daley Pearson, and before Bluey, worked on series such as The Family Law and Australian Survivor. Bush has stated that each episode has its own unique musical style, and he likes to become involved in the episodes as they are scripted; he regularly has detailed discussions with series creator Joe Brumm. Live instruments are regularly played for the recordings. Every episode of Bluey is individually scored, a decision made by Brumm, who was inspired by the original compositions for Charlie and Lola while working on the series in the United Kingdom.

Bush recorded a soundtrack for the first series of the program, titled Bluey: The Album, which was released on 22 January 2021. The soundtrack debuted at number one on the ARIA Albums Chart in February 2021. It was recognised as the first children's album to reach the top of the charts in Australia. It won Best Children's Album at the 2021 ARIA Music Awards, and an APRA Screen Music Award for Best Soundtrack Album in 2021.

Dance Mode! features songs from the first, second and third series of Bluey. The first half of the album contains upbeat songs, while the second half contains quieter and reflective tracks. "Dance Mode" is described as an upbeat, EDM style song, while "Army" and "Grandad" lean into the bluegrass genre with banjo and whistle instrumentation.

== Release ==
It was reported in January 2023 that the soundtrack, entitled Dance Mode!, would contain 17 songs and be released in 2023. The first single, "Dance Mode", was released on 27 January 2023.

The album was officially announced on 27 January 2023, with pre-orders opening on the same day. The album was released on 21 April 2023 on CD, streaming services, and orange vinyl. The album was also released on a limited edition zoetrope vinyl picture disc for Record Store Day on 22 April 2023.

== Track listing ==
All songs written and produced by Joff Bush except where noted.

Dance Mode! track listing
No.	Title	Writer(s)	Length
1.	"Bluey Theme Tune" (Dance Remix)	Written by Bush; produced by Bush; Marly Lüske; Craig Parry	2:00
2.	"Dance Mode"		1:58
3.	"Doo-ba-Zoo"		2:44
4.	"The BeeeeeOOP Walk"		2:18
5.	"Chattermax"	Steve Peach; Bush	1:21
6.	"Copycat"	Jazz D'Arcy; Bush	1:58
7.	"Lollipop Yum Yum Yum"		1:01
8.	"Cat Squad!"		1:01
9.	"Omelette"		2:54
10.	"Sticky Gecko"		4:16
11.	"The Gnome Song" (feat. Meg Washington)	Music by Washington; Bush; lyrics by Washington; Joe Brumm	2:26
12.	"Army"	Pluto Jonze; Bush	2:58
13.	"Grandad"	Jonze; Bush	2:34
14.	"It Was Yesterday"	Bush	1:05
15.	"Rain" (Instrumental)	D'Arcy; Bush	3:37
16.	"Rainbow"	Bush	4:06
17.	"Rain (Boldly in the Pretend)" (feat. Jazz D'Arcy)	Music by D'Arcy; Bush; lyrics by D'Arcy	4:08
Total length:			42:25

== Personnel ==
Joff Bush & The Bluey Music Team

- Joff Bush – guitars, melodica, percussion, accordion, keyboards, bass, vocals, organ, synths, ukulele, Mellotron, piano
- Daniel O'Brien;– piano, percussion, guitars, vocals
- Craig Parry;– beats
- Stephen Peach – keys
- Marly Lüske – synths, bass, percussion, guitar
- Jazz D'Arcy – vocals, guitars
- Meg Washington – vocals
- Pluto Jonze – guitars, piano, drums, bass, harmonica, vocals

Additional performers

- Andrew Scrivens – guitar, banjo
- Julia R. Anderson – drums
- Julian Schweitzer – drums
- Carolyn Morris – cor anglais, oboe
- Christopher Pearson – bass
- David Orr – guitars
- Rose Parker – vocals
- Joseph Roberts – clarinet, flute, baritone, tenor & alto sax
- Katherine Philp – cello
- Pru Montin – trumpet
- Robert Schultz – trumpet
- Youka Snell – violin & vocals
- Saul Burrows – banjo
- Anthony Garrett – drums
- Dave Murtough – trombone
- Thomas Melohn – guitar
- David Barber – guitar & bass
- Rowan Hamwood – flute, piccolo, tin whistle
- Joe Brumm – drums & vocals
- Tiptoe Giants (Meg Lipworth & Vee Couper) – vocals
- Justine Garcia de Heer, Erik Williamson, Layla Collie and everyone else on the album – additional vocals ("Cat Squad!")

Technical

- Marly Lüske – mixing, mastering
- Daniel O'Brien – assistant composer
- Erik Williamson & Rose Parker – recording / assistant engineers
- Uncle Stripe – sound design
- Costa Kassab & Joe Brumm – cover artwork

== Charts ==
Chart performance for Dance Mode!
Chart (2023)	Peak position
Australian Albums (ARIA)	7
Scottish Albums (Official Charts)	18
UK Albums (Official Charts)	87
UK Independent Albums (Official Charts)	4
UK Soundtrack Albums (Official Charts)	1
US Top Album Sales (Billboard)	51
US Independent Albums (Billboard)	41
US Kid Albums (Billboard)	1
US Soundtracks (Billboard)	6
