= Lego Bluey =

- Developer: StoryToys
- Publisher: StoryToys
- Engine: Unity
- Platforms: iOS; Android
- Release: August 2025

Lego Bluey is a 2025 mobile game developed and released by Irish studio StoryToys. It is the third video game to be based on the television series Bluey. The game was announced when the Lego Bluey line of sets were revealed in March 2025, and released several months later.

== Gameplay ==
The game is made up of multiple minigames featuring both regular and Lego Duplo versions of the characters. Upon release the four different games included were Around the House, Beach Day, Garden Tea Party, and Go for a Drive, all based off Lego sets.

== Reception ==
Within the first month of its release, the app was downloaded over a million times, becoming the number one iPad app in multiple countries. It was awarded Best Mobile Game at the 2026 Kidscreen Awards.
