= Bluey: The Videogame =

2023 video game

- Cover art
- Developer: Artax Games (Note: Casual Brothers handles development of future updates)
- Publisher: Outright Games
- Composer: Joff Bush
- Engine: Unity
- Platforms: Nintendo Switch; PlayStation 4; PlayStation 5; Windows; Xbox One; Xbox Series X/S
- Release: WW: 17 November 2023
- Genre: Adventure
- Modes: Single-player, multiplayer

Bluey: The Videogame is a 2023 adventure video game developed by Artax Games and published by Outright Games. It is based on the television series Bluey, and was released on 17 November 2023 for Nintendo Switch, PlayStation 4, PlayStation 5, Windows, Xbox One and Xbox Series X/S.

The game features a story wrapped around a compilation of minigames, the majority of them involving platforming in which players can collect various collectibles. All minigames are accessed through four different maps based on various locations of the show. The game also has an multiplayer option in which four players can play as the Heeler family.

== Gameplay ==
Players explore and solve puzzles in four different maps based on Bluey: the Heeler house and a nearby playground, creek, and beach. Four minigames are available, three of which are based on games the Heeler family have played: Keepy Uppy, Ground is Lava, and Magic Xylophone, with Chattermax Chase being an original game. Some of the minigames involve platforming. Players can also collect optional collectables in each level to unlock stickers that appear in the in-game sticker book, and hats to customize the characters. Up to four people can play at once, taking the roles of the Heeler family.

== Plot ==
During an idyllic, relaxing holiday, the Heeler family, consisting of Bluey, Bingo, Bandit, and Chilli, are spurred into a treasure hunt after Bluey discovers one half of a treasure map drawn behind a picture of Bandit in the 1980s.

== Development ==
Artax, a Spanish game development studio based in Madrid, worked with Ludo Studio (the company that produces the Bluey television series) and the TV show's voice cast when making Bluey: The Videogame. Many of the production team members who worked on the show also helped with development on the game, such as sound designer Dan Brumm, who also voices Uncle Stripe, who also helped create sound effects for the game adaptation. Outright Games released the game for Windows, Xbox One and Series X/S, PlayStation 4 and 5, and Nintendo Switch on 17 November 2023.

== Reception ==
Reception

Aggregate scores
Aggregator	Score
Metacritic	(NS) 65/100 (XBS/X) 56/100
OpenCritic	47% recommend

Review scores
Publication	Score
Computer Games Magazine	6/10
Nintendo Life	5/10
Nintendo World Report	7.5/10

Bluey: The Videogame received "mixed or average" reviews, according to review aggregator Metacritic. Fellow review aggregator OpenCritic assessed that the game received weak approval, being recommended by 47% of critics. Reviews criticized the short length, which clocks in at about one hour to three hours for 100% completion. Reviewers also criticised the high launch price of $40 (USD) on a short length game and noticeable glitches, but said it replicates the look and feel of the TV series.
