= Sara Smilansky =

- שרה סמילנסקי
- Born: January 28, 1922; Jerusalem, Mandatory Palestine
- Died: December 5, 2006 (aged 84)
- Known for: Developmental psychology, types of play
- Scientific career
- Fields: Psychology, developmental psychology
- Institutions: University of Tel Aviv

Sara Smilansky (Hebrew: שרה סמילנסקי; January 28, 1922, Jerusalem, Israel – December 5, 2006) was a professor at Tel Aviv University in Israel and was a senior researcher for The Henrietta Szold Institute: The National Institute for Research in the Behavioral Sciences for the Ruth Bressler Center for Research in Education. She has been a visiting professor for many well known universities such as the University of Maryland, College Park. She focused her research on play training and its effects on children. Her research included studying both Israeli and American, as well as advantaged and disadvantaged, children. She wrote multiple books on children's play and its relation to learning, the effect of divorce and death on children, and the development of twins. Her research on children's play included working with Jean Piaget.

== Sara Smilansky and Jean Piaget ==
Sara Smilansky worked with Jean Piaget, which led to their development of what they called the three categories of play. These categories of play included sensorimotor play, symbolic play, and games with rules. In sensorimotor play, children use their sensorimotor skills to explore their surroundings. In symbolic play, children use symbols to represent another object or thing. In games with rules, children play and are now able to follow rules and understand that there are certain rules for how certain things are played. Smilansky added to Piaget's definition of constructive play by adding that constructive play had a visual element resulting from children's play

== Smilanksy's four types of play ==
Sara Smilansky focused her research on children's play, how they learn through play, and how it relates to their future success. One of Smilansky's main findings in her research was that children engage in four types of play: functional play, conditional play, games with rules, and dramatic play. Functional play is play where children engage in activities that utilize muscles or the sensorimotor. Smilansky and Shefatya said that functional play is “based on children’s need to activate his physical organism”. Conditional play starts around early childhood and lasts until adulthood and involves sensorimotor activities, where children begin using their creativity. Following conditional play is games with rules which include two categories: table games and physical games. Games with rules allow children to understand the idea of rules, accept the rules, and play by the rules. Last is dramatic play which Smilansky and Shefatya described as the most mature type of play. This is where children begin to understand their surroundings and begin to imitate what they see. They concluded that these types of play have effects on the future academic success of children.

== Sociodramatic play ==
One of Smilansky's research focused on sociodramatic play and its importance on children's learning. She said sociodramatic play is “a form of voluntary social play activity in which preschool children participate”. Sociodramatic play is also considered as dramatic play children engage in at a social setting. Sociodramatic play occurs as early as age three in children, but the elements can be seen earlier. This type of play includes two elements: imitative and imaginative. Imitative is when the child imitates a real person and a real situation., which includes imitation of the actions and speech of a person or thing. Imaginative is when children use their imagination to create what they are imitating. Imaginative is needed to work best which allows children's imitation of real-life events realistic and possible. Due to their reality, children are unable to fully imitate the person or situation. Children use both these elements for sociodramatic play, which has been concluded to be helpful for children because it prepares them for school.

=== Effects of sociodramatic play ===
Smilansky studied the effects of sociodramatic play on children both advantaged and disadvantaged. One of her main conclusions is that advantaged children have better speech. This study was an observational research on 36 preschool children. 18 of these children came from a middle to high class background, while the other 18 came from a lower-class background. Advantaged children participated more in sociodramatic play than disadvantaged children. Advantaged children tended to "speak more, in longer sentences, and in longer utterances; use a higher percentage of nouns, adverbs, and numbers; use fewer adjectives, conjunctions, and pronouns; and have a richer vocabulary". Advantaged children also demonstrated sociodramatic play, while disadvantaged children lacked sociodramatic play at age three. Smilansky also compared cultural differences between children and found that children with North African and Middle Eastern parents suffered intellectually and socially in comparison to those with European parents. Overall, sociodramatic play has an effect on both advantaged and disadvantaged preschool children.

== Sociodramatic play and the four types of play ==
Sociodramatic play and the four types of play are key components of children's play and its effects on learning. Sociodramatic play includes rules and expectations children have learned through their experiences that allow them to adapt to their peers when playing in a social setting. Similarly, games with rules, one of the four types of play, is when children learn about rules on how certain games are played and understand that these rules have to be followed. These types of play can be seen not only when a child is playing on their own, but also apparent in social group settings, or sociodramatic play. Sociodramatic play allows Smilansky's four types of play to come into place. For example, children can use their sensorimotor skills, skills found during functional play, during sociodramatic play.

== Legacy ==
Smilansky's research greatly contributed to the world of psychology, especially developmental psychology. It greatly impacted research on the effects of play and learning. Her research allowed for great insight into different types of effects of play on children with different cultural and financial backgrounds. The results of her research and research she's contributed to says that sociodramatic play allows for preparation for children's school years. It was also found that the type of background children come from has an effect on sociodramatic play, which affects their learning and academics.

== Works ==
- 1968 The Effects of Sociodramatic Play on Disadvantaged Preschool Children
- 1988 Clay in the Classroom: Helping Children Develop Cognitive and Affective Skills for Learning
- 1988 On Death: Helping Children Understand and Cope
- 1990 Facilitating Play: A Medium for Promoting Cognitive, Socio-Emotional and Academic Development in Young Children
- 1990 Children's Play and Learning: Perspectives and Policy Implications
- 1992 Dramatic Play: A Practical Guide for Teaching Young Children (Learning Through Play)
- 1992 Twins and Their Development: The Roles of Family and Schools
- 1992 Children of Divorce: The Roles of Family and School
- 2004 Facilitating Play: A Medium for Promoting Cognitive, Socio-Economic and Academic Development
