= Bluey: The Album =

Soundtrack album by Joff Bush
- Released: 22 January 2021
- Recorded: 2018–2020
- Genre: Soundtrack
- Length: 38:46
- Label: Demon
- Producers: Joff Bush; Steven Peach; Marly Lüske; David Barber; Pluto Jonze; Helena Czajka

Joff Bush chronology
Bluey: The Album (2021)	Dance Mode! (2023)

Singles from Bluey: The Album
- 1. "Bluey Theme Tune" Released: 6 November 2020; 2. "Keepy Uppy" Released: 4 December 2020; 3. "Here Come the Grannies!" Released: 18 December 2020; 4. "Bluey Theme Tune (Instrument Parade)" Released: 8 January 2021

Bluey: The Album is the soundtrack album for the first series of the Australian animated television series Bluey, which was released on 22 January 2021 by Demon Records. Most of the soundtrack's music was composed and performed by Joff Bush, the composer for the television program, alongside a team of musicians.

The on-screen music for Bluey had previously been licensed by Universal Music Publishing on behalf of BBC Worldwide Music Publishing. The soundtrack was released through Demon Music Group, a subdivision of BBC Studios, who hold global rights to release the show's music.

The soundtrack debuted at number one on the ARIA Albums Chart in February 2021. It was recognised as the first children's album to reach the top of the charts in Australia. It won Best Children's Album at the 2021 ARIA Music Awards, and an APRA Screen Music Award for Best Soundtrack Album in 2021.

== Background and composition ==
Joff Bush serves as the primary composer of Bluey, writing half of the television show's score himself and leading a group of additional composers, including David Barber. Bush graduated from the Queensland Conservatorium, where he met executive producer Daley Pearson, and before Bluey, worked on series such as The Family Law and Australian Survivor. Bush has stated that each episode has its own unique musical style, and he likes to become involved in the episodes as they are scripted; he regularly has detailed discussions with series creator Joe Brumm. Live instruments are regularly played for the recordings. Every episode of Bluey is individually scored, a decision made by Brumm, who was inspired by the original compositions for Charlie and Lola while working on the series in the United Kingdom.

The soundtrack features arrangements of songs from the first series of the program, including the scores of episodes "Keepy Uppy", "Grannies", "The Pool" and "The Creek". It contains original compositions as well as arrangements of classical pieces such as "John Ryan's Polka" and "Pachelbel's Canon". The first half of the album features upbeat songs, while the later tracks featured are the softer compositions. Vocals by Helena Czajka and Jazz D'Arcy are featured on "I Know a Place (The Creek Song)".

== Release ==
It was reported that Bush was developing a music album for Bluey in July 2019. By July 2020, the album was scheduled to be released in late 2020. The first single from the album; the show's theme song, paired with an additional extended version, was released digitally on 6 November 2020.

Pre-orders for the soundtrack were opened on 4 December 2020, with the release date also being revealed. The single, "Keepy Uppy" was also released alongside the album announcement. The complete soundtrack was released on 22 January 2021, digitally and physically, in a gatefold digipack sleeve with complementary stickers. The cover art was designed by Brumm.

The album was released on vinyl on 17 July 2021 for Record Store Day exclusively in Australia, pressed on a double-sided picture disc, limited to 500 copies. It received a wider release on coloured blue vinyl on 1 October 2021 to coincide with the album's worldwide release.

== Track listing ==
All songs written and produced by Joff Bush except where noted.

Bluey: The Album track listing
No.	Title	Writer(s)	Length
1.	"Bluey Theme Tune" (Instrument Parade)		2:12
2.	"Keepy Uppy"		3:03
3.	"Here Come the Grannies!"		2:24
4.	"A Message from the Fairies" (John Ryan's Polka)	arr. Bush; Steven Peach	2:35
5.	"Taxi"		2:46
6.	"The Claw" (Pachelbel's Canon)	arr. Bush; Marly Lüske	1:37
7.	"Pool"		2:59
8.	"Who Likes to Dance?"		2:27
9.	"Bluey Theme Tune" (Extended)		1:05
10.	"The Weekend"	David Barber; Bush	2:37
11.	"Wagon Ride"		3:22
12.	"Camping"		2:25
13.	"Fruit Bat"	Pluto Jonze; Bush	1:36
14.	"The Creek" (Intro)	Barber; Bush	0:48
15.	"Creek Is Beautiful!"	Helena Czajka; Bush	3:09
16.	"I Know a Place (The Creek Song)" (vocals Helena Czajka & Jazz D'Arcy)	Czajka; Bush; lyrics by Czajka	3:16
17.	"Bluey Theme Tune"		0:25
Total length:			38:46

== Personnel ==
Joff Bush & The Bluey Music Team

- Joff Bush – guitar, melodica, percussion, accordion, keyboards, bass, vocals, kazoo, organ, drums, synths, ukulele, Mellotron, piano
- Stephen Peach – guitars, drums, banjo, tin whistle, bass, keys
- Marly Lüske – synths, bass, percussion, guitar
- David Barber – guitar, harmonica
- Pluto Jonze – guitars, piano, drums, bass
- Helena Czajka – vocals, synths
- Jazz D'Arcy – vocals

Additional performers

- Andrew Scrivens – guitar
- Anthony Garrett – drums
- Charlotte Stent – vocals
- Christopher Pearson – bass
- David Orr – electric guitar, guitar
- Jessica Pollard – vocals
- John Knowles – harmonica
- Joseph Roberts – clarinet, flute, baritone, tenor & alto sax
- Katherine Philp – cello
- Kevin Higgins – pipes, tin whistle, flute
- Luka Wall – vocals
- Pru Montin – trumpet
- Robert Schultz – trumpet
- Sara Glynn – violin
- Steven Washington – violin
- Youka Snell – violin & vocals

Technical

- Marly Lüske – mixing, mastering

== Charts ==
=== Weekly charts ===
Weekly chart performance for Bluey: The Album
Chart (2021)	Peak position
Australian Albums (ARIA)	1
Scottish Albums (Official Charts)	55
UK Independent Albums (Official Charts)	9
US Kid Albums (Billboard)	1
US Top Album Sales (Billboard)	92
US Top Current Album Sales (Billboard)	42

=== Year-end charts ===
Year-end chart performance for Bluey: The Album
Chart (2021)	Position
Australian Albums (ARIA)	82

== Certifications ==
Certifications for Bluey: The Album
Region	Certification	Certified units/sales
United Kingdom (BPI)	Silver	60,000^{‡}
^{‡} Sales+streaming figures based on certification alone.

== Awards and nominations ==
List of awards and nominations received by Bluey: The Album
Award	Year	Recipient(s) and nominee(s)	Category	Result	Ref.
APRA Screen Music Awards	2021	Bluey: The Album	Best Soundtrack Album	Won	
ARIA Music Awards	2021	Bluey: The Album	Best Children's Album	Won	
