= Joe Brumm =

Australian animator and writer

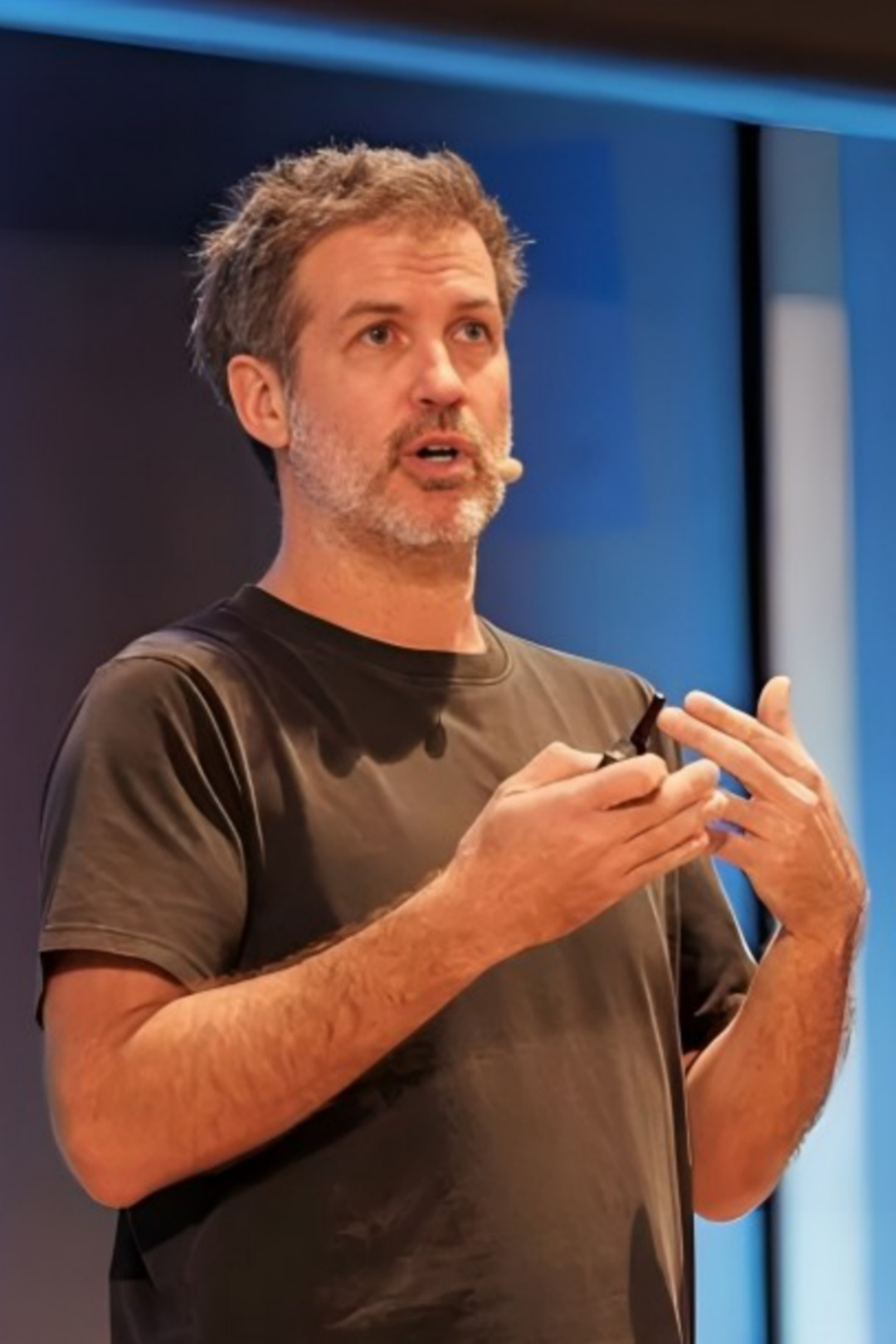
- Brumm in 2024
- Born: Joseph Brumm; 1978 or 1979 (age 47–48); Winton, Queensland, Australia
- Occupations: Animator, writer, director, and voice actor
- Years active: 1998–present
- Known for: Bluey
- Television: Charlie and Lola; Peppa Pig; Ben & Holly's Little Kingdom; Tinga Tinga Tales; Bluey
- Spouse: Suzy Brumm
- Children: 2

Joseph Brumm is an Australian animator, director, writer, and voice actor. After working on multiple British animated children's shows, he created, pitched, and executively produced the Peabody Award-winning Australian animated television series Bluey at Ludo Studio.

== Early life ==
Brumm was born in Winton in Central West Queensland, the second of three boys. His father worked for the Department of Primary Industries, while his mother was a librarian.

After moving to Cairns when he was five years old, his family finally settled in the state's capital city of Brisbane (where Bluey takes place) when he was aged 12, where he began attending high school. He graduated from Marist College Ashgrove in 1995.

After finishing high school, he studied animation at Griffith Film School at Griffith University and graduated in 1998 with a Bachelor of Animation (Honours) degree.

== Career ==
After graduating from university, Brumm relocated to London where he obtained work as an animator on several British series, such as Charlie and Lola, Peppa Pig, Ben & Holly's Little Kingdom and Tinga Tinga Tales.

Brumm returned to Brisbane in 2009. He established a small animation studio called Studio Joho in 2011 with Mark Paterson, with the intent of making an Australian version of Peppa Pig; he swapped the pig characters for dogs and changed the personality of the father. The show would be titled Bluey. Brumm conceived of the show while he was working on Charlie and Lola alongside Paterson, who would later animate Bluey's pilot, in London. Brumm decided the episodes of Bluey would centre around the two juvenile characters participating in play-based learning and creating their own adventures, producing a one-minute sample in 2016. Ludo Studio, a local company, picked it up and helped Brumm expand the sample into a five-minute pilot. Brumm and his wife Suzy subsequently created the first season of 52 seven-minute episodes which was released in Australia in 2018. The show has gone on to achieve commercial success and critical acclaim internationally.

=== Other work ===
In 2000, Brumm created an animated short called Causes, and he directed a 2015 short called The Meek.

=== Adult television ===
On February 20, 2026, Hulu gave a series order for a half-hour, adult animated comedy Deano from creators Dean Thomas and David Ferrier. The series is executive produced by Brumm. Deano follows a mischievous 8-year-old boy with a heart of gold, blending a modern family’s chaos with biting satire.

== Awards and recognition ==
In October 2021, Brumm was named as Griffith University's Outstanding Alumnus.

In June 2023, he was named as a Queensland Great.

On December 17, 2025, he was awarded an honorary doctorate from Griffith University.

== Filmography ==
=== Television ===
Year	Title	Creator	Director	Writer	Producer	Animator	Actor	Notes	Ref(s)
2001–04	2DTV	No	No	No	No	Yes	No		
2004–10	Peppa Pig	No	No	No	No	Yes	No	Lead animator	
2005–08	Charlie and Lola	No	No	No	No	Yes	No	also storyboard artist	
2009–13	Ben & Holly's Little Kingdom	No	No	No	No	Yes	No		
2010–11	Tinga Tinga Tales	No	No	No	No	Yes	No	title sequence animator and storyboard artist	
2010–11	Abadas	No	No	No	No	Yes	No		
2010–24	Dan the Man	Yes	Yes	Yes	No	Yes	No		
2018–24	Bluey	Yes	Yes	Yes	No	No	Yes	Creator; Additional voices	
TBA	Deano	No	No	No	executive	pending	No		

=== Video games ===
Year	Title	Writer	Ref(s)
2025	Bluey's Quest for the Gold Pen	Yes	
