= Megan Washington discography =

Washington discography
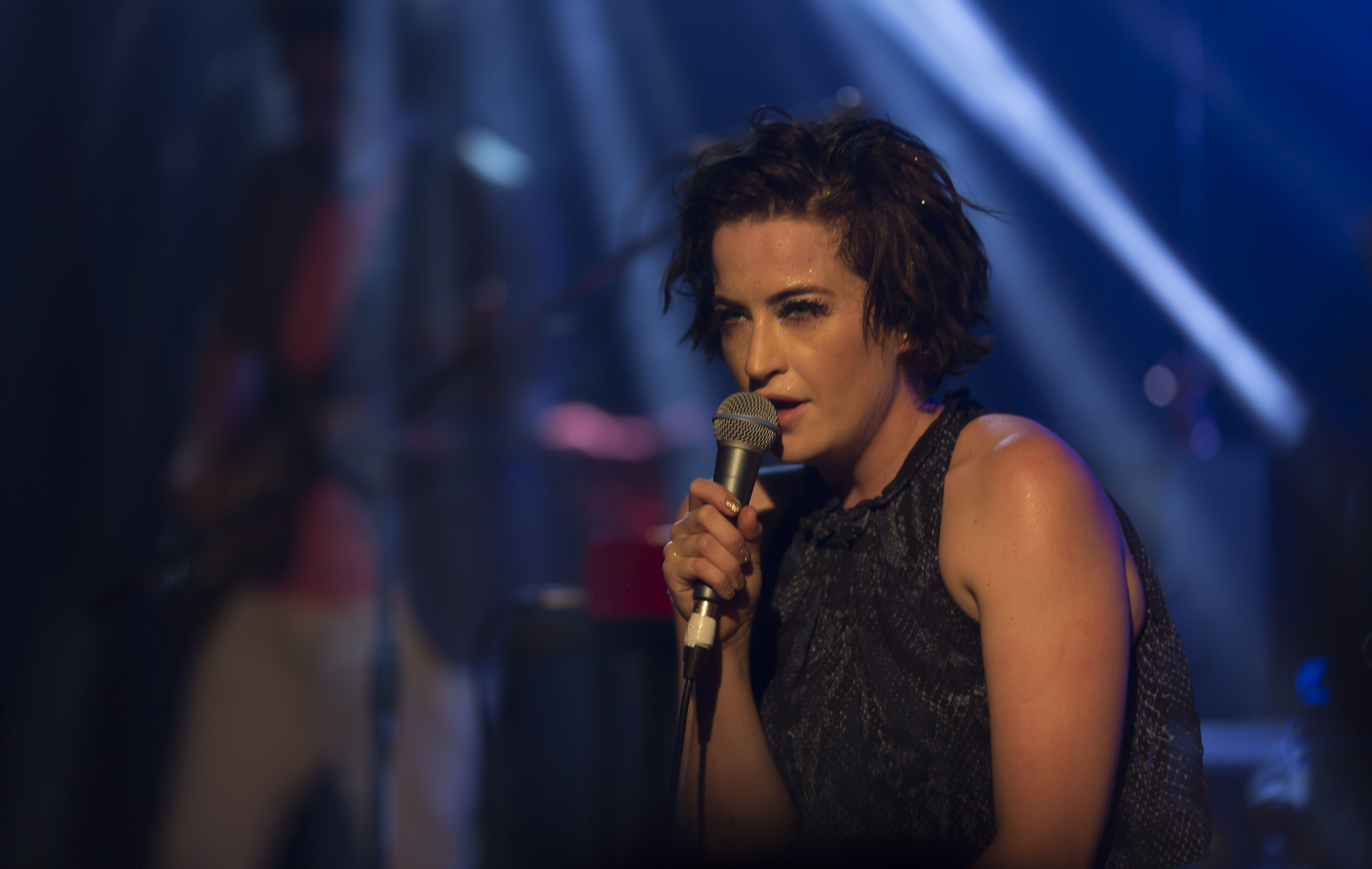
- Studio albums: 5
- EPs: 9
- Live albums: 1
- Singles: 35

Australian singer-songwriter Washington has released five studio albums, nine extended plays, and thirty-five singles (including two as a featured artist and two charity singles).

In 2006, in collaboration with jazz pianist, Sean Foran, Washington released her debut EP Nightlight. The EP won the 2008 Australian Jazz Bell Award for Best Australian Jazz Vocal Album. She released her second EP, Bennetts Lane, with pianist Paul Grabowsky in 2007. Her musical style moved away from jazz when she began backing a blues and roots musician, Old Man River, as the keyboardist and backing vocalist.

In July 2010, Washington released her debut album. I Believe You Liar. The album was a commercial and critical success, peaking at number 3 on the ARIA Charts, and was certified platinum.

== Studio albums ==
List of studio albums, with selected chart positions and certifications
Title	Album details	Peak chart positions	Certifications
Title	Album details	AUS	Certifications
I Believe You Liar	Released: 30 July 2010; Label: Mercury (2744633); Formats: CD, digital download, LP	3	ARIA: Platinum
There There	Released: 12 September 2014; Label: Mercury (3784717); Formats: CD, digital download	5	
Batflowers	Released: 28 August 2020; Label: Universal Music Australia / Island Records (3504377); Formats: CD, digital download, streaming, LP	23	
Hot Fuss	Released: 8 December 2022; Label: Batflowers Records; Formats: digital download, streaming	—	
Gem	Released: 8 August 2025; Label: Origin Recordings (OR239LP); Formats: LP, digital download, streaming	—	

== Live albums ==
List of live albums, with selected details
Title	Album details
Live at Hamer Hall (with the Melbourne Symphony Orchestra)	Released: 9 August 2024; Label: Batflowers Records; Formats: digital download, streaming

== Extended plays ==
List of extended plays, with selected chart positions
Title	EP details	Peak chart positions
Title	EP details	AUS
Nightlight^{[a]} (Megan Washington and Sean Foran)	Released: 2006; Label: Newmarket (NEW3227.2); Formats: CD	53
Bennetts Lane^{[a]} (Megan Washington and Paul Grabowsky)	Released: 2007; Label: Independent; Formats: CD	—
Clementine	Released: November 2008; Label: Washington (HUB001); Formats: CD, digital download	—
How to Tame Lions	Released: 14 September 2009; Label: Mercury/Universal Music Australia (2717430); Formats: CD, digital download	73
Rich Kids	Released: 7 May 2010; Label: Mercury/Universal Music Australia (2737298); Formats: CD, digital download	70
iTunes Live: ARIA Awards Concert Series '10	Released: 4 November 2010; Label: Mercury; Formats: Digital download	—
Insomnia	Released: 21 October 2011; Label: Mercury (2782609); Formats: CD, LP, digital download	24
Moon Tunes	Released: 23 April 2021; Label: Universal Music Australia / Island Records; Formats: Digital download, streaming	—
Switches	Released: 23 July 2021; Label: Universal Music Australia / Island Records; Formats: Digital download, streaming	—

== Singles ==
=== As lead artist ===
List of singles, with selected details
Title	Year	Peak chart positions	Certification	Album
Title	Year	AUS	Certification	Album
"Clementine"	2008	—		Clementine
"Cement"	2009	—		How to Tame Lions
"How to Tame Lions"	2009	—^{[b]}		How to Tame Lions
"Rich Kids"	2010	—^{[b]}		Rich Kids
"Sunday Best"	2010	64	ARIA: Gold	I Believe You Liar
"The Hardest Part"	2010	119		I Believe You Liar
"Bed of Nails"^{[a]}	2011	—		Non-album single
"Clementine" (US re-release)	2011	—N/a		I Believe You Liar
"Holy Moses"	2011	100		I Believe You Liar
"I Believe You Liar"	2011	—		I Believe You Liar
"Riders on the Storm"	2012	—		Non-album single
"Who Are You?"	2014	125		There There
"Limitless"	2014	95		There There
"Begin Again"	2014	138		There There
"My Heart Is a Wheel"	2014	156		There There
"Saint Lo"	2016	—		Moon Tunes
"Claws"	2018	—		Non-album singles
"American Spirit"	2019	—		Non-album singles
"Dirty Churches"	2019	—		Moon Tunes
"Dark Parts"	2020	—		Batflowers
"Switches"	2020	—		Batflowers
"Kiss Me Like We're Gonna Die"	2020	—		Batflowers
"Achilles Heart"	2020	—		Batflowers
"Batflowers"	2020	—		Batflowers
"My Happiness"	2021	—		Non-album single
"Jenny Was a Friend of Mine"	2022	—		Hot Fuss
"Eastcoaster"	2023	—		Non-album singles
"Catherine Wheel" (with Sydney Symphony Orchestra)	2023	—		Non-album singles
"Honeysuckle Island"	2024	—		Non-album singles
"The Hook"	2024	—		How to Make Gravy
"Shangri-La"	2025	—		Gem
"Kidding"	2025	—		Gem
"Fine" (with Paul Kelly)	2025	—		Gem
"Natural Beauty"	2025	—		Gem

=== As featured artist ===
List of featured singles, with selected details
Title	Year	Album
"King of the Rodeo" (The Bamboos featuring Megan Washington)	2009	Side Stepper
"Heist" (Gillieson featuring Megan Washington)	2020	

=== Charity singles ===
List of charity singles
Title	Year	Peak chart positions	Notes
Title	Year	AUS	Notes
"I Touch Myself" (as part of the I Touch Myself Project)	2014	72	The I Touch Myself Project launched in 2014 with a mission to encourage young women to touch themselves regularly to find early signs of cancer.
"Spirit of the Anzacs" (Lee Kernaghan featuring Guy Sebastian, Sheppard, Jon Stevens, Jessica Mauboy, Shannon Noll and Megan Washington)	2015	32	First single from Kernaghan's album Spirit of the Anzacs. The single was released to raise funds for Legacy and Soldier On.

== Other album appearances ==
List of other album appearances, with selected details
Title	Year	Album
"Beautiful Trash" (Lanu featuring Megan Washington)	2011	Her 12 Faces
"Fall" (Lanu featuring Megan Washington)	2011	Her 12 Faces
"Roosevelt Blues" (Lanu featuring Megan Washington)	2011	Her 12 Faces
"The Monkey Dance"	2011	ReWiggled - A Tribute to the Wiggles
"The Wilhelm Scream" (The Bamboos featuring Megan Washington)	2012	Medicine Man
"What Goes On" (Megan Washington & G.Love)	2013	RockWiz Duets: With a Little Help from My Friends
"Ghost" (Kate Miller-Heidke featuring Megan Washington)	2014	O Vertigo!
"Idiot" (Paul Mac featuring Megan Washington)	2015	Holiday from Me
"Zanzibar" (Pat Davern featuring Megan Washington)	2015	Alexander the Elephant in Zanzibar
"What's Going On in the Forest" (Pat Davern featuring Alex Lloyd & Megan Washington)	2015	Alexander the Elephant in Zanzibar
"Alexander Can Run" (Pat Davern featuring Megan Washington)	2015	Alexander the Elephant in Zanzibar
"On the Count of Three" (Pat Davern featuring Alex Lloyd & Megan Washington)	2015	Alexander the Elephant in Zanzibar
"A Plan is Hatched" (Pat Davern featuring Alex Lloyd & Megan Washington)	2015	Alexander the Elephant in Zanzibar
"The Truck Is Beginning to Roll" (Pat Davern featuring Alex Lloyd & Megan Washington)	2015	Alexander the Elephant in Zanzibar
"We Saved the Forest" (Pat Davern featuring Alex Lloyd, Connie Mitchell, Tom Williams & Megan Washington)	2015	Alexander the Elephant in Zanzibar
"Eliza" (The Bamboos featuring Washington)	2019	By Special Arrangement
"The Gnome Song" (Bluey featuring Washington)	2023	Dance Mode!
"Don't Give Us On Me" (Paul Kelly featuring Meg Washington)	2025	Seventy

== Notes ==
a Released under Washington's full name, Megan Washington. b Sales of the single counted towards the EP.
