= Nabil Sabio Azadi =

Iranian-New Zealand artist

- نبیل سابیو آزادی
- Born: Nabil Sabio Azadi; 12 October 1991 (age 34); Auckland, New Zealand
- Notable work: For You The Traveller
- Website: nabilsabioazadi.com

Nabil Sabio Azadi (pronounced [ˈnæbiːɫ ˈsabjo ɑː.zɑː.d̪íː]); Persian: نبیل سابیو آزادی; born 12 October 1991) is a Persian-New Zealand artist who is based in Brisbane, Australia. He is known primarily for his book, For You The Traveller, a hand-bound travel guide.

== Early life and career ==
Azadi was born in Auckland, New Zealand on 12 October 1991 to Persian Baháʼí parents. His parents, Ehsan Azadi — then an industrial designer — and Simin Azadi had fled from the Imperial State of Iran to the Republic of Venezuela in 1979, shortly before the Iranian Revolution, amid escalating persecution of members of the Baháʼí faith. Azadi's parents later relocated to New Zealand, where Azadi was born and raised.

By age 13, Azadi was working as a photographer for New Zealand modelling agencies and saved enough money to travel alone for the first time, later recalling that he "played [his] London-based [brother] off [his] parents" so he could spend time alone in Paris. He continued to travel independently from this age, particularly to France, where he would later create his first commissioned artworks.

Azadi attributes his "extreme sense of fluidity around the idea of home" to his parents and "their own extreme journey", adding that "my concept of home is myself and almost everywhere. It has nothing to do with where I sleep."

=== London, Paris, New York City, and Melbourne (2008–12) ===
In 2008, shortly after turning 17, Azadi began working for the British fashion magazine Dazed & Confused in London. The publication described him at the time as "a renaissance man who concerns himself with anything particularly beautiful, ugly or useful." He became an early contributor to Dazed's then-nascent digital platform, later working as an editor, photographer and writer, and covering ready-to-wear and haute couture fashion shows at Paris Fashion Week. During this period, Azadi lived partly in Paris, London, New York City, and Melbourne, Australia, where he attended the University of Melbourne. Azadi has described this period of wandering and his work in fashion magazine publishing as a "very miscalculated mystic pursuit".

At 19, Azadi was living in New York City while working for magazines and within the fashion industry, a time he later said was marked by precarity. Azadi has noted the effect of this period on his art, stating: "I have good coping mechanisms sometimes for extreme things. I grew up very quickly in most ways. I like the idea of survival. I mean sometimes then I would wish I wouldn’t survive and it would just be over ... I felt like Atlas. I’d scratch myself to pieces at night but ... I smile when I tell the stories because it led me to my art. Since I was a kid it was always ruin and triumph and struggle and fighting."

In 2011, Azadi returned to New Zealand to pursue art, including photography and sculpture. In 2012, he stated to Portable: "I was moving around too much and asking a lot of myself and I don't think anything amplifies a sense of unease like being homeless. I recently moved to Australia and in doing so ... I have discovered that I am not a little Tyler Brûlé in waiting — I like utes, having a lot of space, my dog and not having to deal with much bullshit."

== Education ==
Azadi studied sociocultural anthropology and art history at the University of Queensland. He co-founded the University of Queensland Anthropology Society (UQAS), the university's first such scholarly society since the late 1940s, when Australian anthropologist and doctor Lindsay Winterbotham helped to establish the University of Queensland Anthropology Museum, along with the Anthropological Society of Queensland.

UQAS supports anthropologists and students, and its ethos draws on the idea of “an equitable human assertion,” a line from American poet and cultural critic Amiri Baraka introduced to the group by artist–anthropologist Gina Athena Ulysse. Its approach to education programming and pedagogy incorporated the work of Faye V. Harrison, particularly her approaches to anthropological performance, as well as Edith Turner and Victor Turner’s frameworks of performance ethnography, experimental forms of ethnographic research, and ritual. As part of the society’s activities for undergraduate and graduate students, Azadi also established an Artist–Scholar Mutual Mentorship Network and designed educational initiatives that applied "anthro-poetic" approaches to scholarship and creative practice.

Anthropologist Robert Borofsky, founder of the Center for a Public Anthropology, discussed the work of Azadi and his collaborators in Revitalizing Anthropology (2023). He situated their contributions within a broader movement among emerging anthropologists “exploring new disciplinary possibilities” and developing “a different [kind of] anthropology than you are used to,” characterised by experimentation, performance art, a collaborative ethos, praxis and an orientation toward public benefit.

== Career ==
=== Photography ===
In 2011, Azadi's photographic works were used as the principal album imagery for Australian singer-songwriter Megan Washington’s EP Insomnia.

=== For You The Traveller ===
In 2012, Azadi self-published For You The Traveller, an artist book created in a limited edition of 200 copies. For You The Traveller was a hand-bound guide to the world which contained the names, personal stories and telephone numbers of people across five continents who are willing "to offer themselves a port-of-call to any traveller passing through their region and bearing the book." The book was printed on recycled paper, and each copy featured a handmade cover of salvaged rabbit fur in varying colours, with a Tasmanian oak spine piece secured by small steel bolts.

For You The Traveller was well-received internationally, earning favourable reviews from The New York Times, Monocle, the Chicago Tribune, Fast Company, i-D and The Globe and Mail, and was widely reported on by numerous international editions of Vogue, Elle, Harper's Bazaar and GQ. Rei Kawakubo, founder of Comme des Garçons, acquired one of the limited-edition copies along with other notable figures. The book was named "the best guide book ever" by journalist and book critic Andrew Losowsky for its "beauty [and] humanity" and its "stunning [use of] letterpress-style typography of varying sizes and ... hand drawn maps to create moments of creativity and stillness." Losowsky stated in his review for Huffington Post that "most importantly [For You The Traveller] is so beautifully idiosyncratic and personal that it suggests a chart of the overriding emotions of its cities" and that "there is no other book like it."

In 2013, For You The Traveller was selected by Jay-Z for inclusion in a pop-up shop for Barneys New York. Azadi's first artist book was also sold by high fashion retailers Dover Street Market, Browns in London and Centre Commercial in Paris.

For You The Traveller was acquired by the University of California, Santa Cruz, Special Collections & Archives, and was later exhibited by the university in 2016 as part of a major survey of artist books and works on paper. For You The Traveller, which contained Azadi's paintings, poetry and ethnographic prose, was curated alongside artworks and books by William Blake, Italo Calvino, Stéphane Mallarmé and Miguel de Cervantes, as well as early avant-garde figures such as Guillermo de Torre. The exhibition included a range of interdisciplinary and experimental practitioners, including Jean-Pierre Hébert, Guillermo Gómez-Peña, Kenneth Patchen, Lou Harrison and Jean Anthelme Brillat-Savarin. Also presented alongside For You The Traveller were works by poets associated with modernist, concrete and post-war traditions, among them Robinson Jeffers, Ian Hamilton Finlay, Bob Cobbing, Jonathan Williams and Yusef Komunyakaa.

=== For You The Maker ===
In May 2014, Azadi's announced that he was making a new artist book with contributions from several designers, musicians and writers, as well as the multinational German stationery brand, Faber-Castell. Entitled For You The Maker, the book was described as "an exercise book for life" and amongst its list of contributors were Australian musician Megan Washington, British author Philip Pullman, and fashion designers Rick Owens, Yohji Yamamoto and his daughter Limi Yamamoto. For You The Maker was slated to be released in early 2015.

=== Exhibitions ===
In 2019, Azadi was a participating artist in the University of Queensland Art Museum's staging of John Baldessari’s Wall Painting (2019). Conceived in the late 1960s but left unrealised for more than fifty years, the conceptual artwork has been enacted only twice. Emerging from Baldessari’s instruction-based practice, the work requires a team of artists to repaint a designated wall in a single colour each day, activating the work through delegated labour and adherence to a procedural script of actions. Azadi was selected for one of the daily enactments, contributing to the recent lineage of institutional iterations, including the earlier Monash University Museum of Art realisation, that probe the dynamics of conceptual authorship, embodied practice and collective labour.

== Selected works ==
- 2012 For You The Traveller (Self-published; OCLC 877008818)
- 2014 For You: An Exercise Book For Life (Announced)
