= Sunday Best =

Sunday Best or Sunday's Best may refer to:

== Sunday Best ==
- Sunday best, clothes reserved for church attendance, see Christian clothing
- Sunday Best, British music company
- Sunday Best, American Gospel singing competition series on BET
- Sunday Best, a documentary television series
- "Sunday Best", 2010 song by Megan Washington
- "Sunday Best", 2019 song by Surfaces
- "Sunday Best", 2024 song by Lauren Mayberry from Vicious Creature
- Sunday Best, 2026 studio album by Nick Jonas

== Sunday's Best ==
- Sunday's Best, American emo band
- Sunday's Best (TV program), a Filipino TV special on ABS-CBN channel See list
- "Sunday's Best", a song by Elvis Costello and the Attractions

== See also ==
- Sundy Best, American country music duo
