= Elena Padilla =

Puerto Rican anthropologist (1925–2012)

Elena Padilla (April 4, 1925 – 2012) was a Puerto Rican anthropologist. She conducted research on Puerto Rican migrations to the United States. Padilla attended the University of Puerto Rico, and after graduation was sent on scholarship to study at the University of Chicago. She wrote a master's thesis on Puerto Ricans in New York and Chicago that was published in 1947, and has been cited as a pioneering work.

After writing her thesis, Padilla moved to New York City, earning a PhD at Columbia University and researching for the 1956 work The People of Puerto Rico. She later worked at the Cornell University Medical College, directing a study of the medical experiences of Puerto Ricans living in East Harlem that was published in 1958 as Up from Puerto Rico. Padilla later directed doctoral studies at New York University's Wagner Graduate School of Public Service and as of 2005 was a scholar in residence at St. Barnabas Hospital.

Her anthropological work has in recent years gained increased recognition in the field of Puerto Rican studies.

== Life and career ==
=== Early life and graduate school (1925–1947) ===
Padilla was born on April 4, 1925, in Adjuntas, Puerto Rico, where she grew up. Her parents both died when she was young, and she considered herself an orphan, and was raised by her godparents. She attended the University of Puerto Rico, earning a Bachelor of Arts in 1944.

She entered graduate school on scholarship at the age of nineteen, as part of a group of students from the University who had been sent to various American universities through the efforts of Jaime Benítez Rexach, the University's chancellor. Benítez intended for this group of students to be part of and shape the future faculty of the university and Puerto Rico's government. Padilla was the youngest member of the group, which included several other Puerto Ricans who later became notable, including Ricardo Alegría. While most of the group would return to Puerto Rico after leaving school, Padilla remained in the United States.

Padilla was denied admission because of her age at the school she was first set to attend, the University of Michigan Medical School, and instead entered the University of Chicago's anthropology department in 1944. Padilla was taught by figures including Sol Tax, Robert Redfield, W. Lloyd Warner, Fay-Cooper Cole, John Victor Murra, and Louis Wirth. She conducted research for Wirth while he was on the Committee on International Relations in 1946 and 1947. Padilla was a coauthor of the 1946 "Preliminary Report on Puerto Rican Contract Workers in the Chicago Area", documenting abuses that Puerto Ricans faced while working in the city. She was also involved in picketing an employment agency that had brought the workers from Puerto Rico to Chicago. After the report gained a wider exposure in Puerto Rico, the Senate of Puerto Rico temporarily suspended migration for labor to the United States while an investigation was undertaken.

She wrote a thesis studying the migration of Puerto Rican populations to New York City and Chicago, and comparing the two movements. As part of her research, Padilla worked with Jesús Colón, making use of his archives. Padilla argued, in part, that Puerto Ricans living in Chicago tended to gradually become culturally Mexican, through a process that she deemed left them "Mexicanized". Later scholars, such as Mérida Rúa, have modified this thesis, arguing that the process of cultural change was multidirectional between Latinos living in the city.

Her thesis, completed in 1947, earned her a master's degree in anthropology, and was cited in the 2006 introduction to Latinas in the United States as making "a significant contribution" to the study of Latina/o people in the Midwestern United States, at a time when little had been written about that group. Titled "Puerto Rican Immigrants in New York and Chicago: A Study in Comparative Assimilation", a volume on Puerto Rican anthropology published in her honor in 2010 noted that it had only "recently" been incorporated by scholars doing research on the topic. Padilla's work made her a "pioneering scholar of Puerto Rican racial identities and inter ethnic relations" and latinidad. Rúa deems her work on Puerto Rican immigrants in Chicago "seminal". The thesis influenced later research into the topics it focused on.

=== New York research (1948–2005) ===
After her thesis was completed, Padilla moved to New York City, where she worked with Julian Steward at Columbia University to produce what became The People of Puerto Rico (1956), a work of cultural ecology. She was the only Puerto Rican to work as a senior researcher on the book. Padilla was also credited with assisting in the 1950 study on Puerto Ricans migrating to New York City, The Puerto Rican Journey. After earning her PhD from Columbia in 1951, Padilla studied anthropology and economic history at the London School of Economics from 1952 to 1953.

Padilla never worked at a universities anthropology department in an academic capacity, turning down a job offer at the University of Illinois, saying characteristically that "there was no way she was going to go to the cornfields." Despite this, she continued to work in anthropology after finishing her formal education.

==== Work in medicine ====
Padilla eventually returned from London to New York City and began work at Cornell University Medical College as a clerk.

While at Cornell she directed a study that became her 1958 book Up from Puerto Rico. This was the first significant study headed by a Puerto Rican of Puerto Ricans in America. Published by Columbia University Press, it chronicled Puerto Ricans living in East Harlem, particularly their experiences with the field of medicine. Padilla argued that many Puerto Rican migrants to the city were not welcomed and found themselves blamed for "the degradation of New York city." This in turn led to them turning to the city's existing Puerto Rican community. A review published in American Anthropologist described the book as offering a picture of the "internal life of the Puerto Rican community" and painting a "vivid image" of the immigrant experience, but wished that Padilla had gone beyond simply describing what she saw among communities and studied how the broader development of American society led to the Puerto Rican experience she studied.

She also chaired a New York City council on comprehensive health planning. After Cornell, Padilla taught the politics of health and mental health at New York University (NYU) and worked in Columbia's school of public health, administrative medicine.

Padilla also briefly worked at Michigan State University. Beginning in June 1969, she also worked in Michigan at the Comprehensive State Health Planning Commission, including as acting director beginning in January. She commuted between Michigan and New York City to visit her husband. Padilla directed doctoral studies at NYU's Wagner Graduate School of Public Service, but later was retired. She spent 1993 at St. Barnabas Hospital, and was a scholar in residence there until at least 2005.

== Personal life and death ==
In 1970, Padilla had a husband who she described as "unlisted", Robert Lawson. The two lived together from 1958, and married one year later. Padilla identified as both Puerto Rican and Black. She died in 2012.

== Legacy ==
Despite her research in the field, her anthropological work has not been well recognized. The anthropologists Faye V. Harrison and Ira Harrison wrote that Padilla did not have a lengthy career in academia because of the "fraternity of anthropologists" which sought to maintain the "'purity' of science"; in contrast, Padilla's work to document "subjugated knowledges" often inherently contained what the academic community considered partisan advocacy. A 2001 volume of Centro: Journal of the Center for Puerto Rican Studies on Puerto Ricans in Chicago noted "intellectual indebtedness" to the work of Padilla. She was honored by the Puerto Rican Studies Association in 2002 as a pioneer in the field of Puerto Rican studies.

== Bibliography ==
- Ruiz, Vicki L.; Korrol, Virginia Sánchez (2006-05-03). Latinas in the United States, set: A Historical Encyclopedia. Indiana University Press. ISBN 978-0-253-11169-2.
- Rúa, Mérida M.; Torres, Arlene (2010). "At the Crossroads of Urban Ethnography and Puerto Rican Latinidad". Latino Urban Ethnography and the Work of Elena Padilla. University of Illinois Press. ISBN 978-0-252-03576-0. JSTOR 10.5406/j.ctt2ttcdc.
- Rúa, Mérida M. (2012-07-26). "A Female Network of Domestics, Student Allies, and Social Workers". A Grounded Identidad. Oxford University Press. pp. 3–31. doi:10.1093/acprof:oso/9780199760268.003.0001. ISBN 978-0-19-976026-8.
