= Crossbreed (disambiguation) =

A crossbreed is an organism with purebred parents of two different breeds, varieties, or populations.

Crossbreed may also refer to:

- Crossbreed (band), an American industrial metal band
- Crossbreed, the amalgamation of the music genres of industrial hardcore and drum and bass
- "Crossbreed" (The Americans), a 2017 TV episode
- "A Crossbreed", a 1931 short story by Franz Kafka

== See also ==
- CrossBread, a comedy podcast
