= Rich Kids (EP) =

EP by Washington
- Released: 7 May 2010
- Label: Mercury, Universal

Washington chronology
How to Tame Lions (2009)	Rich Kids (2010)	I Believe You Liar (2010)

Singles from Rich Kids
- 1. "Rich Kids" Released: May 2010

Rich Kids is the fifth extended play by Australian singer-songwriter, Washington. It was released in May 2010.

The EP debuted and peaked at number 70 on the ARIA Charts.

== Track listing ==
No.	Title	Writer(s)	Length
1.	"Rich Kids"	Megan Washington	3:09
2.	"1997"	Washington, Michael Tomlinson	2:57
3.	"Someone Else in Mind"	Washington	3:36
4.	"The Belly of the Whale"	Washington	2:47
5.	"Five and Ten" (demo)	Washington	2:06

== Charts ==
Chart (2010)	Peak position
Australia (ARIA)	70
