= Sheldon College =

Location
- Redlands, Queensland; Australia; 27°34′13″S 153°14′3″E

Information
- Type: Independent, mixed-gender, day school
- Motto: Love, Laughter and Learning
- Established: 1997
- Principal: Kate Mortimer
- Employees: 200+
- Years offered: Early learning to Year 12
- Enrolment: 1500
- Campus: Sheldon
- Website: sheldoncollege.com

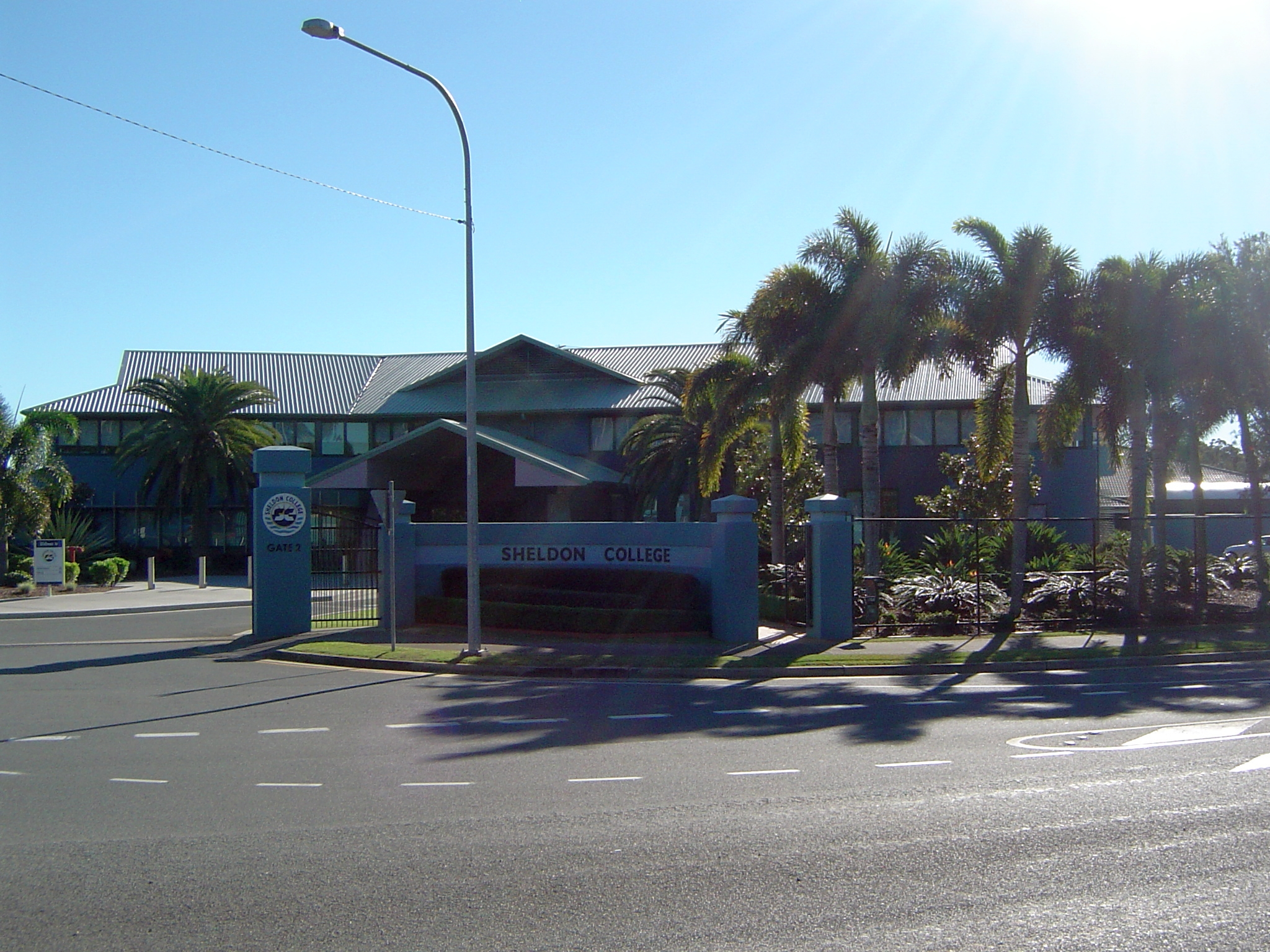
Entrance, 2014

Sheldon College is a private day school located in Sheldon in Redland City, Queensland, Australia. The school admits students from 15 months of age through to Grade 12.

== History ==
Lyn Bishop, the founder of Sheldon College, was previously the Principal of Alexandra Hills State High School and the Deputy Executive of Education Queensland. Sheldon College was established in 1997 with a small staff and approximately 100 students but has since grown to become one of the largest schools in Redland City.

== Facilities ==
The layout of Sheldon College currently includes two libraries, a multi-purpose venue encompassing conference rooms and sporting facilities; and the LINQ Precinct, a study and teaching facility.

== Partnerships and related organizations ==
Academically, the school is a regular competitor at the Australian Space Design Competition, having won four straight national titles from 2011 to 2015. Sheldon has also represented the Australian national team participating in the International Space Settlement Design Competition from 2012 to 2014, being part of the winning team in 2012.

In 2006 the school founded the Australian School of the Arts (ASTA) program. In 2008, 62 Sheldon College instrumentalists performed as part of the concert band at the 2008 Summer Olympics in Beijing. The school continues to run the program. A number of artists, including jazz musician James Morrison, beatboxer Joel Turner, and singer-songwriter Mark Sholtez have held concerts and workshops at the school.

== Houses ==
Sheldon College includes the following four sporting houses

House name	Colour(s)
Valeo	Purple
Spiro	Yellow
Qualitas	Green
Integra	Red

== Notable alumni ==
- Sam Heazlett, cricketer for the Queensland Bulls
- Megan Washington, musician, songwriter and voice actor of Calypso on Bluey
- Elliott Himmelberg, Australian Rules Football Player for Adelaide Crows
- Exodus Lale, performer and Young Artist Award winner

== Notable staff ==
- Adam Lopez, vocalist and previous Guinness World Record holder

=== Board members ===
- Don Seccombe, former Queensland cricketer and Mayor of Redland Shire
