= There There (album) =

Studio album by Megan Washington
- Released: 12 September 2014
- Recorded: 2011–2014
- Genres: Indie rock, indie pop
- Length: 48:32
- Labels: Megan Washington, Mercury
- Producer: Samuel Dixon

Megan Washington chronology
Insomnia (2011)	There There (2014)	Batflowers (2020)

Singles from There There
- 1. "Who Are You" Released: 28 February 2014; 2. "Limitless" Released: 23 May 2014; 3. "Begin Again" Released: July 2014; 4. "My Heart Is a Wheel" Released: 7 September 2014

There There is the second studio album by Australian singer-songwriter Megan Washington, the first crediting her full name. It was released in Australia on 12 September 2014. The album peaked at number 5 on the ARIA Charts.

== Background ==
In August 2011, a year after the release of I Believe You Liar, Washington moved to Brooklyn, following her dream to live in New York City. Washington said "I was dreadfully unhappy there. But having said that, I would have been dreadfully unhappy wherever I was. It was the result of a perfect storm of circumstances. I was just partying a lot and drinking a lot and going out and doing stuff. There was just no meaning. I couldn't find meaning in anything I was doing." As a result, Washington moved back to Australia.

In early 2013, having spent much of the previous year in Australia mentoring on The Voice and filming The Boy Castaways, Washington moved to London to work with Samuel Dixon.

Washington said she had a clear vision for the record "My plan was to create this late-60s, early-70s, gold lame Shirley Bassey sound with trumpets and James Bond-y melodies" she explains.

The pair spent much of the first few months just listening to music, and after Dixon introduced her to the new-romantic sounds of his youth – Tears for Fears, Talk Talk and Roxy Music – the era's OTT moodiness seemed like the natural canvas for her candid narratives.

Dixon also stretched Washington lyrically, pushing her to write about her personal life. "It was a pretty intense period and she’d had such a rough 18 months leading up to it,” Dixon says. “But Meg could also laugh through the tears, and writing about it also helped her deal with things she'd swept under the carpet. What I think Meg's saying on this album is: 'This happened and it's my fault.' She's putting her hand up and saying 'I stuffed up', which is really brave, I think."

== Critical reception ==
Alex Parker of Vulture Magazine gave the album a positive review, saying "Washington has made an album that has the potential to appeal to anyone. Ranging from out of control 80s pop-inspired hits like 'My Heart is a Wheel' to the slowed down, almost orchestral sounding 'Consolation Prize' with its varied mix of drums and string instruments; Washington has masterfully thrown a mix of well crafted sounds and well written lyrics together to create an album that truly is a work of art."

Marcus Floyd of Renowned for Sound gave the album 5 out of 5, saying; "There There is a masterpiece from beginning to end; not one track is a filler, and it's so hard to find an album in this day and age where every song stands out... In every lyric and note sung, you can hear fragments of Megan's heart and soul and that's what makes the record so special."

Bree Cohen of the AU Review gave the album 7.6 out of 10, saying "[she was] Glad that there are some stunning gems to be found within this album, but saddened that there is a distinct lack of hard hitting pop goodness that she did oh so well."

Ross Clelland of the Music AU gave the album 4 out of 5, adding "As luminous as parts of this are, you still feel the best of Megan Washington is yet to come."

Janine Israel of The Guardian said "There There is a consummate post-breakup toolkit, pairing soulful piano-led tearjerkers with indie pop gems so upbeat, you could give yourself whiplash dancing to them."

== Track listing ==
Original edition
No.	Title	Writer(s)	Length
1.	"Yellow & Blue"	Samuel Dixon / Megan Washington	3:42
2.	"My Heart Is a Wheel"	Dixon / Washington	3:45
3.	"Limitless"	Dixon / Washington	4:15
4.	"Skyline"	Dixon / Washington	3:51
5.	"Begin Again"	Dixon / Washington	4:15
6.	"Who Are You?"	Dixon / Washington	4:12
7.	"Get Happy"	Dixon / Washington	2:41
8.	"Marry Me"	Dixon / Washington	3:38
9.	"The Falling"	Dixon / Washington	4:39
10.	"Consolation Prize"	Dixon / Washington	5:13
11.	"To or Not Let Go"	Washington	4:29
12.	"One for Sorrow"	Washington	3:52
Total length:			48:32

iTunes Store bonus tracks
No.	Title	Writer(s)	Length
13.	"Valentine"	Washington	4:18
14.	"Limitless [Single Version]"	Dixon /Washington	3:50
Total length:			56:40

Deluxe Edition (live recordings)
No.	Title	Writer(s)	Length
1.	"Begin Again"	Dixon / Washington
2.	"Get Happy"	Dixon / Washington
3.	"Yellow & Blue"	Dixon / Washington
4.	"Consolation Prize"	Dixon / Washington
5.	"Who Are You?"	Dixon / Washington
6.	"Skyline"	Dixon / Washington
7.	"Limitless"	Dixon / Washington
8.	"My Heart Is A Wheel"	Dixon / Washington

== Charts ==
Chart performance of There There
Chart (2014)	Peak position
Australian Albums (ARIA)	5

== Release history ==
Region	Date	Format	Label	Edition	Catalogue
Australia	12 September 2014	CD, digital download, LP	Mercury	Standard	3784717
Australia	12 September 2014	2x CD	Mercury	Deluxe	3794606
Australia	2015	2x LP	Mercury	Special	3796688
