= Adam Lopez =

Australian singer

- Born: Adam Lopez Costa; 26 August 1975 (age 51)
- Origin: Brisbane, Australia
- Genres: Latin, pop
- Occupation: Head of the vocal faculty at Sheldon College's Australian School of the Arts
- Years active: 2005–present
- Label: ABC Music/Universal
- Website: www.adamlopez.com
- Education: Queensland Conservatorium of Music

Adam Lopez Costa (born 26 August 1975) is an Australian pop musician, vocal coach, and session vocalist. He is noted for his ability to produce extremely high notes in his whistle register and for his extensive six-octave vocal range. From 2008 to 2018, he was a Guinness World Record holder for singing the highest note (by a male) and a half step below the E in the 8th octave (E♭_{8}). He currently heads the vocal faculty at Sheldon College's Australian School of the Arts.

== Biography ==
Lopez was the second of three sons born to Spanish parents, Manuel Jesús López Pérez and María Del Rosario Costa Velasco. Both of his parents were musicians. Having started singing at the age of three, Lopez was a treble (boy soprano) by age ten. After finishing high school, Lopez studied voice at the Queensland Conservatorium of Music at Griffith University. He spent five years there studying opera, although he spent a total of ten years developing his distinctive vocal abilities.

In addition to solo work, Lopez has worked as a session vocalist, singing backing vocals for Mariah Carey, Debelah Morgan, Keith Urban, Vanessa Amorosi, and other Australian artists. He has also worked in television and radio.

His 2008 Latino album titled Till The End of Time features Australian jazz musician James Morrison on trumpet.

== Previous World record ==
According to the Guinness Book of World Records, Lopez held the world record for highest vocal note produced by a male from 2008 to 2018. That pitch is designated D♯_{8} in note-octave notation; it is three semitones above the highest note on a standard grand piano or 4435 Hz. Before achieving this record, Lopez held the previous Guinness World Record for singing C♯_{8} in 2005. The record was surpassed by Xiao Lung Wang from China on 20 January 2018, recognised by Guinness for singing E_{8} or 5243 Hz. The current record holder is Amirhossein Molaei from Iran, who sang F♯_{8} or 5989 Hz on 31 July 2019.

== Discography ==
=== Studio albums ===
- 2005: The Popera EP
- 2006: Showstopper
- 2008: Till the End of Time
- 2014: Kaleidoscope
- 2017: This Heart of Mine

=== Singles ===
- 2014: "When All Is Said And Done"
- 2014: "Paper Boat"
- 2015: "You / Holiday" – double single
