= CrossBread =

Mockumentary podcast

CrossBread is a scripted comedy podcast written by Declan Fay, Megan Washington, and Chris Ryan. The show was commissioned and produced by the Australian Broadcasting Corporation and executive produced by Tom Wright. The six-episode series follows protagonists Josh and Joan Burns as they form the eponymously named Christian rap duo. The show was nominated for an ARIA award and won an AWGIE award in 2020 and 2021 respectively.

== Production ==
The show was executive produced by Tom Wright and written by Declan Fay, Megan Washington, and Chris Ryan with original music composed and performed by Megan Washington and Chris Ryan. The writing for the show began in September 2019 after being commissioned by ABC Comedy and ABC Audio Studios.

The podcast is a scripted comedy podcast in the form of a mockumentary. The podcast is six episodes long. Each episode is between 14 and 35 minutes in length. Fay, Ryan, and Washington all grew up in Christian youth groups.

=== Cast and characters ===
- Aaron Chen as Ken Lim
- Chris Ryan as Josh Burns (aka MC Cross)
- John Waters as Reverend Philip Brock
- Kate McLennan as Amanda
- Megan Washington as Joan Burns (aka Dr. Bread)
- Sami Shah as Pradeep Sandeep

== Plot ==
The story is set in the eastern suburbs of Melbourne, Australia where the protagonists, Josh and Joan Burns, start a Christian hip-hop group called CrossBread. Their songs are a hit on Christian streaming platform GodTube in 2015, which launches them into stardom. Joan and Josh are not religious, but see this as an opportunity for a musical career. The story is told by the rap duo's former social media manager who is sharing footage from their archives. The two members of the rap group are fraternal twins from Boronia, Victoria. He traces the story of their beginnings working at a donut shop to the point when the group fell apart. Josh Burns pretends to be part of a Christian rap group to impress a date and picks the name CrossBread because his date is wearing a crucifix and was buttering a piece of bread. CrossBread competes in the Battle of Believers for a $1,000 prize.

== Reception ==
Writing for the Christian website Eternity News, Ben McEachen praised the show saying that it "presents an excellent opportunity to humorously consider what you live for."

=== Awards ===
| Award | Date | Category | Recipient | Result | Ref. |
|---|---|---|---|---|---|
| ARIA Music Awards | 2020 | Best Comedy Release | "Just Jesus" | Nominated | |
| Apple Podcasts Annual Charts | 2020 | Shows We Loved This Year (selected by Apple’s podcast team) | CrossBread | 1 | |
| AWGIE Awards | 2021 | Audio | "In The Beginning" | Won | |
