= James C. Faris =

American anthropologist and epistemologist

James Chester Faris (born November 1, 1936 in Durango, Colorado) is an American cultural and ethnographic anthropologist and epistemologist. He obtained his PhD in Cambridge in 1966 and joined the faculty of the University of Connecticut in 1969 as associate professor of anthropology. After retirement he moved to New Mexico. As an anthropologist he has published work on communities in Newfoundland, Sudan, and the Southwestern United States.

Faris is known for his research in the areas of cognitive anthropology, ritual, anthropological linguistics, art and aesthetics in relation to visual anthropology, as well as critical theory.

Faris' papers from 1960 to 2014 are held in the permanent collection of the Smithsonian Institution.

Faris lives in New Mexico, and is Emeritus Professor of the University of Connecticut.

== Books ==
- Cat Harbour: A Newfoundland Fishing Settlement. 1966. Revised second edition, 1972.
- Some Aspects of Clanship & Descent amongst the Nuba of South-Eastern Kordofan. 1968.
- Nuba Personal Art. 1972.
- Visual Rhetoric: Navajo Art and Curing.
- Southeast Nuba Social Relations. 1989.
- The Nightway: A History and a History of Documentation of a Navajo Ceremonial. 1990.
- The Navajo and Photography: A Critical History of the Representation of an American People. 1996.
