= Lindsay Winterbotham =

Medical practitioner and anthropologist

Lindsey Page Winterbotham (1887–1960) was an Australian doctor and anthropologist, who helped to establish the Anthropology Museum at the University of Queensland.

== Early life ==
Lindsey Page Winterbotham was born on 14 April 1887 in North Adelaide, South Australia. He attended the Collegiate School of St Peter. He enrolled in medicine at the University of Adelaide but transferred to the University of Melbourne in his third year where he graduated with an MB BS in 1908. He moved to Queensland where he undertook his medical residency at the Brisbane General Hospital. After working as locum in several country towns Winterbotham established his own practice in Lowood in 1909. In 1912 he married nurse Constance Mary Moore. They moved to Annerley in Brisbane where Winterbotham established his practice and remained there until his death.

== Military service and membership of charitable organisations ==
In early 1914, Winterbotham was appointed a captain in the militia of the Australian (Army) Medical Corps. During World War I, he provided services to training sites around Brisbane. Following the war he was honorary surgeon at the Mater Misericordiae Hospital, South Brisbane, between 1920 and 1925. He was a visiting medical officer to the Blind, Deaf and Dumb Institution of Queensland. Winterbotham was a member of the Queensland branch of the British Medical Association and helped to organise the general practitioners' group of the association in 1939. He served as chairman until 1949 and was president in 1944. He lobbied for pay rises for R.M.O.s. During World War II, he participated in the committee which monitored wartime petrol rationing and he lectured in medical ethics at the University of Queensland. Winterbotham was patron of the university's medical society between 1943 and 1944.

== Anthropological work ==
Winterbotham had become a student of anthropology in the late 1930s and a dedicated collector of Aboriginal artefacts in the 1940s. He donated his considerable collection of Aboriginal artefacts to establish an anthropology museum at the University of Queensland in 1948, confident that the collection would be preserved and useful to the establishment of a course at the university. Winterbotham became the museum's honorary curator and it remained in his home until 1957 due to space issues at the university's campus. He placed advertisements in newspapers and used his medical network to invite people to donate Aboriginal artefacts to the further establishment of the collection, applying recommendations on the content they hoped to receive. He visited communities in Western Australia, the Northern Territory and far North Queensland collecting ceremonial objects and recording songs. The call went out to missionaries in Papua New Guinea as well to act as agents for any artefacts representative of this region. Over 10,000 items were donated or purchased, adding to his collection of over 1,000 items. After the provision of a government grant for the museum's development Winterbotham interviewed and corresponded with many Aborigines to learn and record cultural practices, languages and stories. Winterbotham interviewed Willie McKenzie (Gairarbau), an Aboriginal elder from the Jinabara community of the Kilcoy district over a period of five years, to record his stories and cultural practices, using advice from Norman Tindale to refine his questions relating to language. Winterbotham was unsuccessful in finding a publisher to take on his manuscript, Gairarbau’s story of the Jinabara tribe of South East Queensland (and its neighbours), although he had been able to record some of Gairarbau's corroboree songs which he offered for sale as long play records. Many of Winterbotham's papers were published in journals of the time including Mankind. His (E. Sandford) Jackson lecture of 1951 entitled, 'Primitive Medical Art and Primitive Medicine-Men of Australia', was published in the Medical Journal of Australia.

In 1948, Winterbotham, Professor H. J. Wilkinson, professor of anatomy at the university and F. S. Colliver of the Queensland Museum established the Anthropological Society of Queensland. The society aimed to preserve the Indigenous cultures of Australia, New Zealand, Papua and New Guinea. Winterbotham was honorary secretary of the society from 1948 to 1949 and its president from 1954 to 1955.

== Personal life ==
Winterbotham died on 26 February 1960 in Brisbane and was survived by his wife, Constance, and their five sons and one daughter.
