= Faye V. Harrison =

American anthropologist

Faye Venetia Harrison
- Born: November 25, 1951 (age 74)
- Occupations: Anthropologist; Scholar; Educator; Writer
- Spouse: William Conwill
- Children: 3
- Awards: Association of Black Anthropologists Legacy Scholar Award (2010); American Anthropological Association Presidential Award (2018)

Academic background
- Education: Brown University (BA); Stanford University (MA); Stanford University (PhD)

Academic work
- Discipline: Anthropology; African American Studies; African Diaspora Studies
- Institutions: University of Illinois at Urbana-Champaign; University of Florida; University of Tennessee

Faye Venetia Harrison is an American anthropologist. Her research interests include political economy, power, diaspora, human rights, and the intersections of race, gender, and class. She is currently Professor of African American Studies and Anthropology at the University of Illinois at Urbana-Champaign. She formerly served as Joint Professor of Anthropology and African American Studies at the University of Florida. Harrison received her BA in anthropology in 1974 from Brown University, and her MA and PhD in anthropology from Stanford University in 1977 and 1982, respectively. She has conducted research in the US, UK, and Jamaica. Her scholarly interests have also taken her to Cuba, South Africa, and Japan.

From 1989 to 1991, Harrison served as president of the Association of Black Anthropologists (ABA). During her term with the ABA, she worked to ensure ABA presence at American Anthropological Association (AAA) conferences and commissions, and helped to establish the ABA’s journal Transforming Anthropology (first published in 1990). She served as President of the International Union of Anthropological and Ethnological Sciences from 2013 to 2018, a position that allowed her to collaborate with anthropologists around the world. She is an author in and editor of Decolonizing Anthropology (1991,1997, 2010) and wrote Outsider Within: Reworking Anthropology in the Global Age (2008), in addition to dozens of articles, encyclopedia entries, essays, book chapters, and reviews.

The Routledge Companion to Contemporary Anthropology describes the edited volume Decolonizing Anthropology as a "key moment of reinvention" for American anthropology, encouraging the re-centering of anthropological work by people of color. The authors included in the volume argue for the necessity of directing the focus of anthropological work towards the advancement of global equality and human liberation, and outline the methodological, ethical, and political considerations this decolonized anthropology would require. In her introduction, Harrison emphasizes the importance of reading the work of intellectuals from the Global South and understanding the impact of the intersections of race, class, and gender on cultural consciousness and colonial discourse. The book was the result of the first invited session from the ABA at an AAA conference, given by Harrison and her colleague Angela Gilliam in 1987, which was also titled “Decolonizing Anthropology.” Harrison credits the work of anthropologists Bernard Magubane and James C. Faris as a key source of inspiration for the session and, later, the volume.

== Personal life ==
Faye V. Harrison is married to William Conwill. William Conwill has worked towards creating modes of mental health promotion and healing based upon antiracist and antisexist frameworks. Additionally, Faye V. Harrison has three sons, Giles, Mondlane and Justin. Her eldest son, Giles, has followed in the footsteps of Harrison by receiving his PhD in cultural anthropology.

== Education ==
Faye Harrison completed her undergraduate studies at Brown University in 1974, receiving a B.A. in anthropology. While attending Brown University, Harrison was supported by professors Louise Lamphere and George Houston Bass. Louise Lamphere was integral in inspiring Harrison’s motivation to study anthropology. George Houston Bass influenced Faye Harrison to appreciate and incorporate the art of performance within her academia.

After receiving her bachelor's degree from Brown University, Harrison was granted the Samuel T. Arnold Fellowship to continue graduate level research from 1974 to 1975. Harrison continued her studies at Stanford University where she received a M.A. (1977) and Ph.D. (1982) in Anthropology. As a student, she received funding from Fulbright-Hays (1978–79), the Wenner-Gren Foundation (1980-81), the Danforth Foundation (1981–82), and the Ford Foundation (1987–88). While at Stanford, she studied with St. Clair Drake and Bridget O’Laughlin, whom she credits as a major influence on her approach to anthropological and political anti-racist activism. Harrison was deeply influenced by St. Clair Drake and his understanding of the relationship between anthropology and racial politics as well as the history of Black Anthropologists. Harrison has claimed that one of her primary goals of re-envisioning anthropology, as focused on in her book Outsider Within: Reworking Anthropology in the Global Age (2008), is “meant to extend his legacy as a teacher and role model.”

== Career ==
=== Educator ===
1983-1989: Assistant Professor, University of Louisville

1989-1997: Associate Professor, University of Tennessee-Knoxville

1996-1998: Adjunct Associate Professor, Department of Anthropology, University of Binghamton, State University of New York (SUNY).

1997-1999: Professor of Anthropology and Graduate Director of the Women's Studies Program, University of South Carolina-Columbia

1999-2004: Professor of anthropology, University of Tennessee-Knoxville

2004-2014: Professor of African American Studies and Anthropology, and Affiliate Faculty with the Center for Latin American Studies and the Center for Women’s Studies & Gender Research, University of Florida

While a professor at the University of Florida, Harrison taught courses in the department of Anthropology. Harrison was also a professor of African American Studies. During an interview with the university, "the reputation and high caliber of the Anthropology department at the University", according to Harrison, was a major factor in her decision to teach there. Harrison thought the university was an "excellent place to train graduate students interested in the African diaspora and the intersections of race, gender, and class that shape sociocultural life and political practices".

2014–present: Professor of African American studies and anthropology, University of Illinois at Urbana-Champaign

Harrison joined the university's Anthropology department in 2014 as a professor of African American studies, and later joined the Department of Anthropology through a partial appointment. Harrison is also a faculty affiliate with the Program on Women & Gender in Global Perspectives, the Center for African Studies, and the Center for Latin American & Caribbean Studies. Harrison is currently a professor at the university, in which she has made significant contributions towards the politics and history of anthropology along with African American and African Diaspora studies. She has taught courses at the University of Illinois on Key Issues in African American Studies, Africana Feminisms, and Human Rights from Cross-Cultural Perspectives.

As part of her teaching methodology, Harrison practices "anthro-performance", a combination of ethnography and performance. Harrison has utilized this methodology to dramatize the anthropological information she aims to share with her students, colleagues and the general public. To that end, Harrison has aimed to bridge anthropology with art as an alternative means of knowledge production, inspiring other diverse approaches to anthropology. A notable performance piece of Harrison's, “Three Women, One Struggle” (1990), utilizes performance to highlight how poor Black women experience common realities globally. Her performance touches upon race, class, gender, and commonalities between different cultures. Camee Maddox Wingfield, an academic at University of Maryland, Baltimore County, provided an ABA 50th anniversary special commentary on Harrison’s use of “anthro-performance” stating, “her 'anthro-performance' pedagogical technique was an exciting intervention in that it challenged the elitist norms of teaching and learning in academic institutions with which minority and working-class students often struggle.”

=== Scholar ===
Harrison has been recognized for her academic leadership in addition to her achievements as an educator. Within anthropology, she writes about racism, structural violence, and gender. Harrison is the author of Outsider Within: Reworking Anthropology in the Global Age, as well as the editor and contributor to Resisting Racism and Xenophobia: Global Perspectives on Race, Gender, and Human Rights, African-American Pioneers of Anthropology (co-edited), and three editions of Decolonizing Anthropology: Moving Further Toward an Anthropology for Liberation. Harrison's work has also been included in a number of major anthologies in feminist scholarship and African diaspora studies, including Afro-Descendants, Identity, and the Struggle for Development in the Americas; Transnational Blackness: Navigating the Global Color Line; Women Writing Culture; Afro-Atlantic Dialogues: Anthropology in the Diaspora; Situated Lives: Gender & Culture in Everyday Life; Third World Women & the Politics of Feminism; Gender & Globalization: Women Navigating Cultural & Economic Marginalities; Blackness in Latin America and the Caribbean; and perhaps most prominently in Feminist Activist Ethnography.

Faye Harrison's edited volume Decolonizing Anthropology: Moving Further Toward an Anthropology for Liberation has curated a dialogue surrounding the re-assessment of the anthropological field and the necessity for greater contribution by people of color. Faye Harrison’s scholarly efforts in illuminating the phenomenon of decolonizing anthropology has led many scholars to incorporate this idea into their work and scholarly strategies. Her contribution to ideas surrounding decolonization have made scholars Jafari Sinclaire Allen and Ryan Cecil Jobson ask new questions such as, “Does decolonizing anthropology require institutional locations in which we may meet and engage in dialogue with more Black, brown, and working-class students?” and “How, then, can our practices of scholarship, undergraduate and graduate teaching, and administrative work serve the project of decolonization?” Some Black anthropological scholars have responded to decolonizing anthropology by exiting the field to pursue related programs. Additionally, the de-colonial project has influenced an increase in university approval of Black Studies programs including programs at University of California, Los Angeles, University of Pennsylvania and University of Texas-Austin.

== Awards ==
2003: Hardy Liston, Jr. Symbol of Hope Award.

2004: Society for the Anthropology of North America (SANA) Prize for Distinguished Achievement in the Critical Study of North America.

2007: Zora Neale Hurston Award for Mentoring, Service & Scholarship; Southern Anthropological Society.

2007: President’s Award, American Anthropological Association.

2010: Legacy Scholar Award, Association of Black Anthropologists.

2013: William R. Jones Outstanding Mentor Award, Florida Education Fund.

2018: President’s Award, American Anthropological Association.

2018: Distinguished Service Award, International Union of Anthropological and Ethnological Sciences.

== Affiliations ==
Faye Harrison has held many scholarly leadership and membership positions throughout her lifetime. She is the former president of the Association of Black Anthropologists (1989–1991). She served on the Executive Board of the American Anthropological Association from 1990 to 1991 and 1999 to 2001. From 1999 to 2002, Harrison was an Advisory Board member for a PBS film, “Race–The Genealogy of an Illusion.” From 2001 to 2007, Harrison was an advisory board member for the American Anthropological Association's "Understanding Race and Human Variability” initiative. She served two terms as an Executive Committee Member for the International Union of Anthropological and Ethnological Sciences (2003–2013). She also chaired the International Union of Anthropological and Ethnological Sciences' Commission on the Anthropology of Women from 1993 to 2009. From 2013 to 2018, Harrison was the president of the International Union of Anthropological and Ethnological Sciences. She was the first African American and second woman to hold the presidency of the IUAES.

Harrison has also held editorial board member roles including her editorial board membership to Fire!!! The Multi-Media Journal on Black Studies (2011), an advisory editorial board membership to Anthropological Theory (2014–2020), as well as an editorial board membership to American Anthropologist (2000-2005, 2016-2020).

== Major publications ==
Harrison, F. V. (Ed.) (1991). Decolonizing Anthropology: Moving Further Toward an Anthropology for Liberation. American Anthropological Association.

Decolonizing Anthropology is part of a bigger project aimed at transforming and reconstructing the area in addition to creating a study which concentrates upon this diversity and similarity of people. The essayists in this book write about why they think anthropologists should consider and critique power structures and criticize the culture and politics of academia. This work shows the benefits and potential of decolonized anthropology, that should be further investigated and enhanced. Decolonizing focuses on the use of "data, social and cultural analysis, conceptualizing, and knowledge application methodologies" in ethnographic research to help us curate a clearer understanding of intercultural and international harmony, as well as "global transformation." The essayists in this edited work argue that power and privilege in societies, including industrial societies, is what anthropologists should be investigating.

Harrison, F. V. (1995). The Persistent Power of "Race" in the Cultural and Political Economy of Racism. Annual Review of Anthropology, 24(1), 47-74.

This work illustrates how anthropology has played a major part throughout the formation and reconstruction of race, mostly as a cognitive instrument and a social reality. With facing the challenges of the biological idea of race, several anthropologists have taken a "no-race" approach as well as an intergroup variation approach which stresses ethnicity-based classification as well as organization methods. On the other hand, the high reliance upon ethnicity has largely overlooked racism's persistence and terrible impacts on local communities, nation-states, and the global system. For much of the last decade, anthropologists increasingly revived a curiosity within subtle but sometimes concealed causes as well as practices of racial disparity. Race's enhanced deflation throughout modern sociocultural scenery, a racialization of ethno-nationalist disputes, anthropology's numerous antiracism traditions, and intranational and worldwide differences throughout racial constructions, like whiteness's historically disregarded configurations, have all been the subject of new research.

Harrison, I. E., & Harrison, F. V. (Eds.). (1999). African-American Pioneers in Anthropology. University of Illinois Press.

A notable collection of intellectual biographies is the first to look at the lives of thirteen early African-American scholars who became anthropologists between 1920 and 1955, highlighting both the achievements as well as the overall problems that were mostly implicit and sometimes overt racism of the day. This book describes not only their careers within and outside of anthropology but also the theories and methods they used and created. Those interested with African-American studies and biography, and otherwise anthropology, would like this compilation.

Harrison, F. V. (2008). Outsider Within: Reworking Anthropology in the Global Age. University of Illinois Press.

Outsider Within presents the way towards carefully reconstructing anthropology in aims to discuss gender and race problems in a timely manner. Faye V. Harrison's nine key improvements to the profession include studying in an ethical and politically precise fashion, encouraging wider variety throughout the profession, rethinking concept, and contributing to such a meaningful international discourse. Harrison examines the constraints as well as possibilities of anthropology first from perspectives of an African American woman, relying on parts prepared over her illustrious twenty-five-year tenure in Caribbean and African American studies. She also sees commonalities between individuals regardless their social, cultural, and ideological differences. Harrison urges anthropologists of various climatic, cultural, and national backgrounds to communicate in overcoming evident gender, ethnic, and national barriers in order to participate in dialogue.

== Reception ==
Harrison and other decolonialist anthropologists have begun to receive criticism. Peter Pels, an anthropologist whose research focuses on colonized peoples, wrote that anthropology should not be decolonized. He also wrote that the efforts of decolonial anthropologists of his and Harrison's generation amounted to the same work as had been done under post-colonial anthropology. He believes that full decolonization of anthropology could lead to future anthropologists repeating the scientific racism of the past. He also criticizes decolonial anthropology for forgetting a central idea of decolonization, that it is impossible to avoid thought shaped by European norms.
