= Batflowers =

Studio album by Megan Washington
- Released: 28 August 2020
- Length: 49:26
- Labels: Washington; Island
- Producers: Gabriel Strum; Luke Holland

Megan Washington chronology
There There (2014)	Batflowers (2020)	Hot Fuss (2022)

Singles from Batflowers
- 1. "Dark Parts" Released: 15 May 2020; 2. "Switches" Released: 26 June 2020; 3. "Kiss Me Like We're Gonna Die" Released: 13 July 2020; 4. "Achilles Heart" Released: 23 July 2020; 5. "Batflowers" Released: 6 August 2020

Batflowers is the third studio album released by Australian singer-songwriter Megan Washington. It appeared on 28 August 2020, six years after her previous studio album, There There.

At the ARIA Music Awards of 2020, the album won the ARIA Award for Best Cover Art for the work by Adam Dal Pozzo, Megan Washington and Michelle Pitiris. The album's ninth track, "Lazarus Drug", played during the final scene of "The Sign", a 28-minute episode of Bluey, which aired on 14 April 2024.

== Background and release ==
Washington said "I've been working on the record since 2015, I was trying so hard, that was the problem, actually. I was trying to be, like, fancy or something? What I've learned the literal hard way is when I try too hard, it sucks."

As quoted in the Daily Telegraph newspaper in 2018, "Sugardoom is about good old-fashioned love. It was deliberately intended to be a departure from 2014's There There, an intensely personal EP that in part detailed a broken engagement. The album is described as 'full of lush', '60s-inspired tones, this album chronicles the intensity of her past two years."

Washington stated that the album would not be called Sugardoom and that it would be released in early 2019. While the album has been finished, Washington stated she has been working on other projects so she has placed the album "in the fridge" for the time being and there is no announced release date.

Washington recalls a conversation with her manager in early 2019 where her manager (Cathy) said "You're kind of kooky and fun, but you don't get that impression from your music.. because you're really serious in your songs." Washington began working on the album, and it was set to be released under the title Sugardoom, then later Achilles Heart, with the later proceeding as far as a vinyl test pressing. Washington said it was "beautiful and assured and confident… but just not stupid enough". In 2020, Washington said she "saw the light" saying "There's this idea of professionalism and perfection that I just don't believe in anymore."

Most of the production is by Gabriel Strum (p.k.a. Japanese Wallpaper) with Washington remembering, "He has a jazz background like me, so his knowledge of what makes music go, is pretty complete, and on top of that, he has amazing production skills which make him a dream producer." "Lazarus Drug" was co-produced by Strum with Luke Howard, "[it] was a good one, because it was built with me on Minjerribah at Stradbroke Island, Gab in Melbourne, and [Howard] who did some co-production. Sam [Dixon] was in London, and he mixed it. It had a good geographical span. I don't know a lot about modular synths – and he makes everything seem like the cosmos."

== Reception ==
Professional ratings
Review scores
Source	Rating
The Guardian	4/5 stars
NME	4/5 stars

Bernard Zuel from The Guardian said "Megan Washington's third album ripples and glistens but is best described as contained, its strongest messages coming in its most exposed moments."

Caleb Triscari from NME said "With Batflowers, Washington has shown how much an artist can mature and grow over six years, offering up a record that is as stylistically complex as it is worth the wait."

== Track listing ==
Batflowers track listing
No.	Title	Writer(s)	Length
1.	"Batflowers"	Megan Washington, Jason Wu	3:04
2.	"Not a Machine"	Washington, Mario Spate	4:37
3.	"Dark Parts"	Washington, Samuel Dixon	2:59
4.	"Paradise Lost"		3:26
5.	"Switches"	Washington, Dixon	5:28
6.	"Catherine Wheel"	Washington	4:30
7.	"The Give"	Washington	4:45
8.	"Silencio"	Washington, Dixon	3:49
9.	"Lazarus Drug"	Washington	5:32
10.	"Move You"	Washington, Dixon	3:47
11.	"Achilles Heart"	Wu, Washington	3:21
12.	"Kiss Me Like We're Gonna Die"	Washington, Alex Evert, Sam Fisher, Alex Terheimer	4:08
Total length:			49:26

== Charts ==
Chart performance of Batflowers
Chart (2020)	Peak position
Australian Albums (ARIA)	23

== Release history ==
Region	Date	Format	Label	Catalogue
Various	28 August 2020	CD; digital download; streaming	Washington / Island Records Australia	3504377
Australia	2 October 2020	2×LP	Island Records Australia	0733673
