= How to Tame Lions (song) =

- UK promo single cover

Single by Washington

from the album How to Tame Lions & I Believe You Liar
- Released: October 2009
- Length: 3:49
- Label: Mercury
- Songwriter(s): Megan Washington
- Producer(s): John Castle, Megan Washington

Washington singles chronology
| "Cement" (2009) | "How to Tame Lions" (2009) | "Rich Kids" (2010) |

Music video
- "How to Tame Lions" on YouTube

"How to Tame Lions" is a song by Australian musician Washington, released in October as the second and final single from the EP of the same name. It is also inlaced on her debut studio album, I Believe You Liar (2010). Sales toward the song counted toward the EP, which peaked at number 73 on the ARIA charts.

In December 2009, the song won first place in the inaugural Vanda & Young Global Songwriting Competition.

At the ARIA Music Awards of 2010, the song was nominated for Single of the Year.

It was released in the United Kingdom in 2011 as a promotional single for the album, I Believe You Liar.

== Music video ==
The music video was released on 12 October 2009.
