= I Believe You Liar =

Studio album by Washington
- Released: 30 July 2010
- Recorded: 2008–2010
- Genre: Indie rock
- Length: 57:36
- Labels: Mercury, Universal

Washington chronology
| Rich Kids (2010) | I Believe You Liar (2010) | Insomnia (2011) |

Alternative cover
- 2011 re-release cover

Singles from I Believe You Liar
- 1. "Sunday Best" Released: 20 August 2010; 2. "The Hardest Part" Released: 12 October 2010; 3. "Clementine" Released: 21 June 2011; 4. "Holy Moses" Released: 5 August 2011; 5. "I Believe You Liar" Released: 6 November 2011

I Believe You Liar is the debut studio album by Australian singer-songwriter Washington. It was released on Mercury Records in Australia on 30 July 2010. The album peaked at number 3 on the ARIA Albums Chart.

At the J Awards of 2010, the album was nominated for Australian Album of the Year.

== Background ==
I Believe You Liar is largely composed of tracks from Washington's previous three EP releases, Clementine (2008), How to Tame Lions (2009), and Rich Kids (2010). Out of the twelve tracks on the original Australian edition, five were included previously on these releases. Although the album somewhat lacked new material, it was a commercial success in Washington's native Australia, peaking at number 3 on the ARIA Albums Chart. A special edition of the album was released simultaneously, including a bonus CD which included all other tracks from Washington's previous three EPs.

In October 2011, the album was released internationally in the UK and US with new cover artwork, and a revised track listing omitting "Clementine" and including two new tracks from Washington's then-upcoming EP Insomnia, which was released exclusively in Australia two weeks later. This edition of the album was also slightly remixed and featured alternate production on some songs, and was also released in Australia as a re-release on the same day. Compared to the original release, the album was a commercial flop, failing to chart in both the UK and US, and failed to re-enter the album into the ARIA Top 50.

== Singles ==
Overall, five singles were released from I Believe You Liar, as well as single from previously released extended plays.

"Sunday Best" and "The Hardest Part" were released exclusively in Australia in August and October 2010 following the album's release in July.

"Clementine" was released as the album's lead and only single in the US in June 2011, despite the song not being included on the US edition of the album.

"Holy Moses" was released in Australia and the UK in August 2011 as the album's third single, and lead single from Insomnia in Australia, and as the album's lead single in the UK. The album's title track, "I Believe You Liar" was released as the album's second single in the UK in November 2011 and fifth and final single overall.

== Critical reception ==
Professional ratings
Review scores
| Source | Rating |
|---|---|
| Allmusic | 3/5 stars |

Alexey Eremenko from Allmusic gave I Believe You Liar a mixed-to-positive review, criticizing the album's production and questioned its authenticity, and called it a "missed chance". However, he praised the upbeat atmosphere and lyrics, and said the album "packs plenty of potential and some downright good songs".

== Track listing ==
Original edition
| No. | Title | Writer(s) | Producer(s) | Length |
|---|---|---|---|---|
| 1. | "1997" | Megan Washington; Michael Tomlinson | | 2:53 |
| 2. | "Navy Blues" | Washington | | 3:37 |
| 3. | "Cement" | Washington | John Castle; Megan Washington | 3:36 |
| 4. | "Underground" | Washington | | 3:47 |
| 5. | "Rich Kids" | Washington | | 3:03 |
| 6. | "Sunday Best" | Washington | | 3:21 |
| 7. | "Clementine" | Washington | | 3:07 |
| 8. | "Lover / Soldier" | Washington | | 5:35 |
| 9. | "Spanish Temper" | Washington | | 4:11 |
| 10. | "The Hardest Part" | Washington | | 4:12 |
| 11. | "How to Tame Lions" | Washington | Castle; Washington | 3:48 |
| 12. | "I Believe You Liar" | Washington | | 5:35 |

Australasian special edition bonus disc
| No. | Title | Writer(s) | Producer(s) | Length |
|---|---|---|---|---|
| 1. | "One Man Band" | | | 4:04 |
| 2. | "Teenage Fury" | Washington | Castle; Washington | 3:12 |
| 3. | "80 Miles" | | | 2:38 |
| 4. | "Someone Else in Mind" | | | 3:34 |
| 5. | "Five & Ten" | | | 2:08 |
| 6. | "Halloween" | Washington | Castle; Washington | 3:52 |
| 7. | "Welcome Stranger" | Washington | Castle; Washington | 3:57 |
| 8. | "Fighting the Good Fight" | | | 3:18 |
| 9. | "The Belly of the Whale" | | | 2:42 |

2011 Re-release
| No. | Title | Writer(s) | Producer(s) | Length |
|---|---|---|---|---|
| 1. | "1997" | Washington; Tomlinson | Castle; Washington | 2:54 |
| 2. | "Navy Blues" | Washington | Castle; Washington | 3:38 |
| 3. | "Cement" | Washington | Castle; Washington | 3:41 |
| 4. | "Underground" | Washington | Castle; Washington | 3:50 |
| 5. | "Holy Moses" | Washington; Jarrad Kritzstein | Castle; Jarrad Kritzstein; Washington | 3:38 |
| 6. | "Sunday Best" | Washington | Castle; Washington | 3:22 |
| 7. | "Rich Kids" | Washington | Castle; Washington | 3:04 |
| 8. | "Lover / Soldier" | Washington | Castle; Washington | 5:34 |
| 9. | "Spanish Temper" | Washington | Castle; Washington | 4:12 |
| 10. | "Plastic Bag" | Washington | Castle; Washington | 3:38 |
| 11. | "The Hardest Part" | Washington | Castle; Washington | 4:11 |
| 12. | "How to Tame Lions" | Washington | Castle; Washington | 3:48 |
| 13. | "I Believe You Liar" | Washington | Daniel Denholm | 5:36 |

== Charts ==
=== Weekly charts ===
Chart performance of I Believe You Liar
| Chart (2010/11) | Peak position |
|---|---|
| Australian Albums (ARIA) | 3 |

=== Year-end charts ===
| Chart (2010) | Position |
|---|---|
| Australian Albums (ARIA) | 43 |

== Certifications ==
| Region | Certification | Certified units/sales |
|---|---|---|
| Australia (ARIA) | Platinum | 70,000^{^} |
^{^} Shipments figures based on certification alone.

== Release history ==
| Region | Date | Format | Label | Edition |
|---|---|---|---|---|
| Australia | 30 July 2010 | CD, digital download, LP | Mercury | Original |
| Australia | 30 July 2010 | CD, digital download | Mercury | Special |
| Australia | 7 October 2011 | CD, digital download | Mercury, Universal | Re-release |
| United Kingdom | 7 October 2011 | CD, digital download | Mercury, Universal | Re-release |
| United States | 11 October 2011 | CD, digital download | Mercury, Universal | Re-release |
