= Australian School of the Arts =

Arts school of Sheldon College in Brisbane, Australia

Coordinates: 27°34′11″S 153°14′01″E

- Interactive map of Australian School of the Arts
- Address: Brisbane; Australia
- Owner: Sheldon College

Construction
- Years active: 2006 - present

Website
- www.astalive.com.au

The Australian School of the Arts (ASTA) is an arts program founded by the Sheldon College Institute of the Arts in 2006. The initiative was designed by Darren Harvey in an attempt to create "unparalleled creative learning experiences in the arts". Industry professionals such as Adam Lopez, Alastair Tomkins, Jessica Hughes and Murray James lead the program in vocal, performance, dance and media courses respectively.

== Program Structure ==
The program encompasses four fields of study including Combined Performing Arts, Music, Visual Art and Film and Television. Many of their students have also gone on to study at the Queensland Conservatorium of Music, Western Australian Academy of Performing Arts, Victorian College of the Arts and other highly recognised universities and institutions around Australia.

Major annual events are also held to enable the students to grow as performers and gain experience. These include the Arts Academy Awards (held at the Sheldon Event Centre), Dance Night (held at the Redlands Performing Arts Centre) and the school musical. In addition to these major events, there are several minor annual events, some of which include the ASTA Information Evening, ASTA Showcase and ASTA Day of Excellence.

Links between with the program have been made to major universities such as Griffith University. This is through the Applied Theatre course and a Digital Production course which are both administrated on campus.

== In the Media ==
In 2012, ASTA announced its annual school musical (How to Succeed in Business Without Really Trying) and its subsequent cast. ABC commentator Spencer Howson is likely to be support of the production following his support for the High School Musical production in 2010.

In 2013, ASTA received the rights to perform the award-winning musical Hairspray. The production received six standing ovations for all six sold-out shows at the Redlands Performing Arts Centre.

Annual musicals held at the Redland Performing Arts Centre in Cleveland, Queensland, have since included West Side Story, Dreamgirls, and The Addams Family.
