= Limitless (Megan Washington song) =

Single by Washington

from the album There There
- B-side: "Dreamer"
- Released: 23 May 2014
- Length: 3:50
- Label: Mercury
- Songwriter(s): Megan Washington, Samuel Dixon

Washington singles chronology
"Who Are You" (2014)	"Limitless" (2014)	"My Heart Is a Wheel" (2014)

Music video
- "Limitless" on YouTube

"Limitless" is a song by Australian musician Washington, released in May 2014 as the second single from her second studio album, There There.

The song peaked at number 95 on the ARIA Charts.

== Music video ==
The music video premiered on 23 May 2014. In it, Washington deals with the problem of singing in lifts. Sure, you can sing along to your favourite track by yourself, but when you're joined by others, you feel a certain sense of duty to stop.

== Reception ==
Lucy Dayman from Tone Deaf said "'Limitless' is an exciting illustration of the Washington / Dixon collaboration" calling the single "world-class."

== Track listing ==
1. "Limitless" - 3:50
2. "Dreamer" - 4:37

== Charts ==
Chart (2014)	Peak position
Australia (ARIA)	95
