= Nightlight (EP) =

EP by Megan Washington and Sean Foran
- Released: 2006
- Recorded: 7 April 2006
- Label: Newmarket

Washington chronology
| Nightlight (2006) | Bennetts Lane (2007) |

Nightlight is a collaborative extended play by Australian singer-songwriter Megan Washington and Sean Foran. It was released in 2006.

At the 2008 Australian Jazz Bell Awards, it won Best Australian Jazz Vocal Album.

Following an appearance on Spicks & Specks, the EP debuted and peaked at number 53 on the ARIA Charts in October 2009.

== Track listing ==
| No. | Title | Writer(s) | Length |
|---|---|---|---|
| 1. | "Everybody's Talkin'" | Fred Neil | 4:09 |
| 2. | "Fin" | Foran, Washington | 5:36 |
| 3. | "Water and Time" | Rafael Karlen, Washington | 3:58 |
| 4. | "Some Other Time" | Leonard Bernstein, Betty Comden, Adolph Green | 6:40 |
| 5. | "Nightlight" | Foran, Washington | 3:47 |
| 6. | "No Surprises" | Colin Greenwood, Jonny Greenwood, Ed O'Brien, Philip Selway, Thom Yorke | 4:58 |

== Personnel ==
- Megan Washington – vocals
- Sean Foran – piano, electric piano
- Benjamin Portas – artwork
- Sam Vincent – double bass
- John Parker – drums
- Chris Pickering – guitar
- John Parker – mixer

== Charts ==
| Chart (2009) | Peak position |
|---|---|
| Australia (ARIA) | 53 |
