= Sunday Best (Washington song) =

Single by Washington

from the album I Believe You Liar
- Released: 20 August 2010
- Genre: Pop, alternative
- Length: 3:19
- Label: Mercury
- Songwriter: Megan Washington

Washington singles chronology
"Rich Kids" (2010)	"Sunday Best" (2010)	"The Hardest Part" (2010)

Music video
- "Sunday Best" on YouTube

"Sunday Best" is a song by Australian musician Washington, released in August 2010 as the lead single from her debut studio album, I Believe You Liar.

== Composition ==
The song is an upbeat alternative/pop rock song in common time. It features keyboards, drums and electric bass. It consists of several guitar and keyboard riffs.

== Music video ==
The music video was released on YouTube 27 July 2010. The video is themed as a black and white film, with musical themes. It consists of Washington and two bandmates in a restaurant, beginning with French dialogue and then progressing to a musical like scene. The clip contains references to French New Wave cinema, and is filmed in that style. The video was filmed in Brisbane, Australia.

The music video also features Michael Tomlinson of the band Yves Klein Blue.

== Charts ==
Chart performance for "Sunday Best"
Chart (2010)	Peak position
Australia (ARIA)	64

== Certifications ==
Certifications for "Sunday Best"
Region	Certification	Certified units/sales
Australia (ARIA)	Gold	35,000^{‡}
^{‡} Sales+streaming figures based on certification alone.
