= University of Queensland Anthropology Museum =

Anthropology museum in Brisbane, Australia

Coordinates: 27.4973°S 153.0118°E

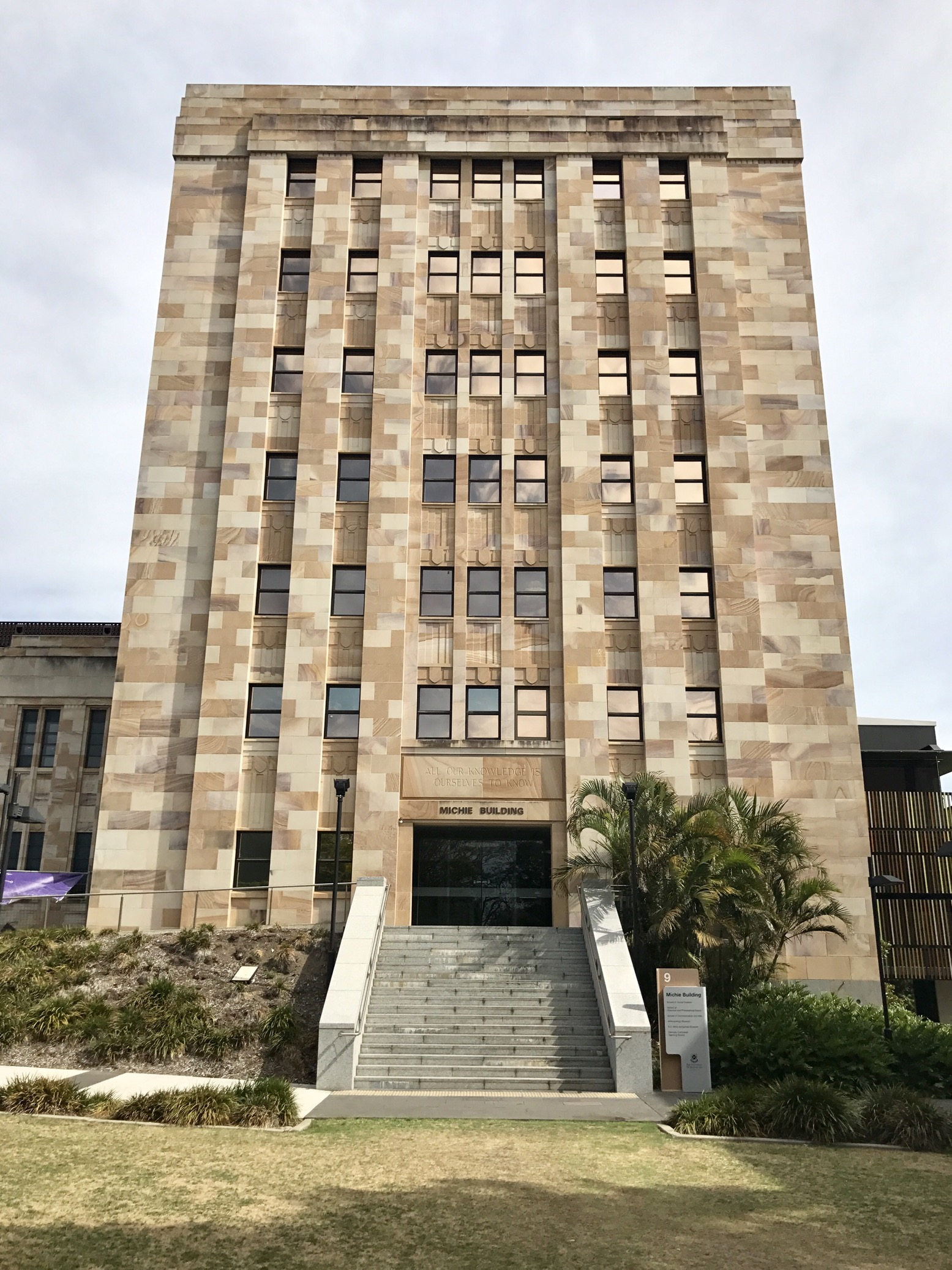
The UQ Anthropology Museum is located in the Michie Building (09), St Lucia Campus. The Museum annex can be seen on the right.

The University of Queensland Anthropology Museum is located in Brisbane, Australia. It houses the largest university collection of ethnographic material culture in Australia.

== Location ==
The Museum is located on level 1 of the Michie Building at the St Lucia campus of The University of Queensland

== History ==
The Museum was formed in 1948 by Dr Lindsey Winterbotham's donation of over 1,000 objects. The initial focus of the Museum was on the material culture of Aboriginal Australia, but swiftly broadened to incorporate a diverse range of material from Papua New Guinea, Solomon Islands and the broader Pacific region. Early donors to the museum included missionaries, researchers and anthropologists such as Ursula McConnel and AP Lyons.

Under subsequent Directors (Dr Peter Lauer, Dr Leonn Satterthwait and Dr Diana Young), the Museum developed an active exhibition program and strengthened the Museum's involvement in community engagement, research and teaching.

== Collection ==
The Museum houses over 28,000 artefacts and over 8,000 photographs. The collection includes field collections and private donations and as a whole describes mid-late 20th century intercultural engagements in Queensland and the Pacific region.

The Museum holds a broad range of stone artefacts from across Australia.

The collection includes smaller collections from southern Africa and Southeast Asia, as well as a collection of colonial surveying equipment from William Landsborough and Augustus Gregory.

== Publications ==
The museum has published several series of academic monographs, namely the "Cultural and Historical Records of Queensland" and the "Occasional Papers in Anthropology,' which changed its name to: "TEMPUS: Archaeology and Material Culture Studies in Anthropology". Publication started in 1973 and will be listed below. In addition, the museum also publishes books and/ or catalogues based on specific exhibitions.

=== Cultural and Historical Records of Queensland ===
The series editor was Peter K. Lauer.

- Number 1: The Simpson Letterbook – transcribed by Gerry Langevad (1979)
- Number 2: Illustrated catalogue of Aboriginal artefacts held in The University of Queensland Anthropology Museum – compiled by Lindy Allen (1980)
- Number 3: Annotations to Publications by W.E. Roth – complied by Lindy Allen and Bernice Borey (1984)

=== Occasional Papers in Anthropology ===
The series editor was Peter K. Lauer.

- Number 1: Multiple papers (1973)
- Number 2: Multiple papers (1973)
- Number 3: Pottery Traditions in the D’Entrecasteaux Islands of Papua by Peter K. Lauer (1974)
- Number 4: Multiple papers (1975)
- Number 5: Bow and Arrow Census in a West Papuan Lowland Community: A New Field For Functional-Ecological Study by Hitoshi Watanabe (1975)
- Number 6: Multiple papers (1976)
- Number 7: Field Notes from the D’Entrecasteaux and Trobriand Islands of Papua by Peter K. Lauer (1976)
- Number 8: Fraser Island (1977)
- Number 9: Readings in Material Culture (1978)
- Number 10: Multiple papers (1980)
- Number 11: Australia and her Neighbours: Ethnic Relations and the Nation State by H. Loiskandl (1982)
- Number 12: Over the Edge: Functional analysis of Australian stone tools by Johan Kamminga (1984)

The series' name changed to TEMPUS.

=== TEMPUS: Archaeology and Material Culture Studies in Anthropology ===
The series' editors were Leonn Satterthwait and Jay Hall.

- Volume 1: Plants in Australian Archaeology (1989) (Editors: Wendy Beck, Anne Clarke and Lesley Head)
- Volume 2: Problem Solving in Taphonomy: Archaeological and Palaeontological studies from Europe, Africa and Oceania (1990) (Editors: Su Soloman, Iain Davidson and Di Watson)
- Volume 3: Quinkan Prehistory: The archaeology of Aboriginal art in southeast Cape York Peninsula, Australia (1995) (Editors: M.J. Morwood and D.R. Hobbs)
- Volume 4: Archaeology of Northern Australia (1996) (Editors: Peter Veth and Peter Hiscock)
- Volume 5: Issues in Management Archaeology (1996) (Editors: Laurajane Smith and Anne Clarke)
- Volume 6: Australian Archaeology `95: Proceedings of the Australian Archaeological Association Annual Conference (1996) (Editors: Sean Ulm, Ian Lilley and Anne Ross)
- Volume 7: Barriers, Borders, Boundaries: Proceedings of the 2001 Australian Archaeological Association Annual Conference (2002) (Editors: Sean Ulm, Catherine Westcott, Jill Reid, Anne Ross, Ian Lilley, Jonathan Prangnell and Luke Kirkwood)
- Volume 8: An Archaeology of Gariwerd: From Pleistocene to Holocene in Western Victoria (2005) (Editors: Caroline Bird and David Frankel)

=== Museum exhibitions ===
- Kirrenderri: Heart of the Channel Country (2022) (Editors: Michael C. Westaway, Mandana Mapar, Tracey Hough, Shawnee Gorringe, Geoff Ginn).

== Highlights ==
Highlights include South East Queensland material, including photographs, manuscripts, audio recordings and drawings. Collections from Stradbroke Island and Moreton Bay include basketry and midden material.

120 piece ceramic mural Creation III by renowned sculptor Thancoupie

One of the earliest collections of Aurukun ceremonial sculpture

North Queensland rainforest shields and jawun bicornial baskets

Large collection of mid to late 20th century bark paintings from Arnhem Land, including works by David Malangi, Wandjuk Marika and Wally Mandarrk

19th century carvings from the Solomon Islands

Painted bark cloth from across the Pacific, from mid 19th century Futuna salatasi to contemporary Omie works|

== Visiting the Museum ==
The Museum is on level 1 of the Michie Building and is open 11am to 3pm daily. Admission is free
