= How to Tame Lions =

EP by Washington
- Released: September 2009
- Label: Mercury, Universal
- Producer: John Castle, Megan Washington

Washington chronology
Clementine (2008)	How to Tame Lions (2009)	Rich Kids (2010)

Singles from How to Tame Lions
- 1. "Cement" Released: July 2009; 2. "How to Tame Lions" Released: October 2009

How to Tame Lions is the fourth extended play by Australian singer-songwriter, Washington. It was released in September 2009.

Following an appearance on Spicks & Specks, the EP debuted and peaked at number 73 on the ARIA Charts in October 2009.

== Track listing ==
All tracks are written by Megan Washington.

No.	Title	Length
1.	"Cement"	3:38
2.	"How to Tame Lions"	3:49
3.	"Teenage Fury"	3:12
4.	"Halloween"	3:52
5.	"Welcome Stranger"	3:57

== Charts ==
Chart (2009)	Peak position
Australia (ARIA)	73
