= Insomnia (Washington EP) =

Studio album by Washington
- Released: 21 October 2011
- Genre: Indie pop
- Length: 32:51
- Label: Mercury

Washington chronology
I Believe You Liar (2010)	Insomnia (2011)	There There (2014)

Insomnia is an EP by Australian musician Washington. It is the follow-up to her 2010 debut album I Believe You Liar. It was released on Mercury in 2011, and peaked at number 24 on the Australian ARIA Charts.

== Track listing ==
No.	Title	Writer(s)	Length
1.	"Holy Moses"	Megan Washington / Jarrad Kritzstein	3:37
2.	"Plastic Bag"	Megan Washington	3:38
3.	"Skeleton Key"	Megan Washington	4:27
4.	"Sentimental Education"	Megan Washington	4:19
5.	"Public Pool"	Megan Washington	3:12
6.	"Letterbox"	Megan Washington	3:09
7.	"High Treason"	Robin Waters	5:30
8.	"Insomnia"	Megan Washington	4:59
Total length:			32:51

== Charts ==
Chart performance of Insomnia
Chart (2011)	Peak position
Australian Albums (ARIA)	24
