= Megan Washington =

Australian musician and songwriter (born 1986)

Meg Washington
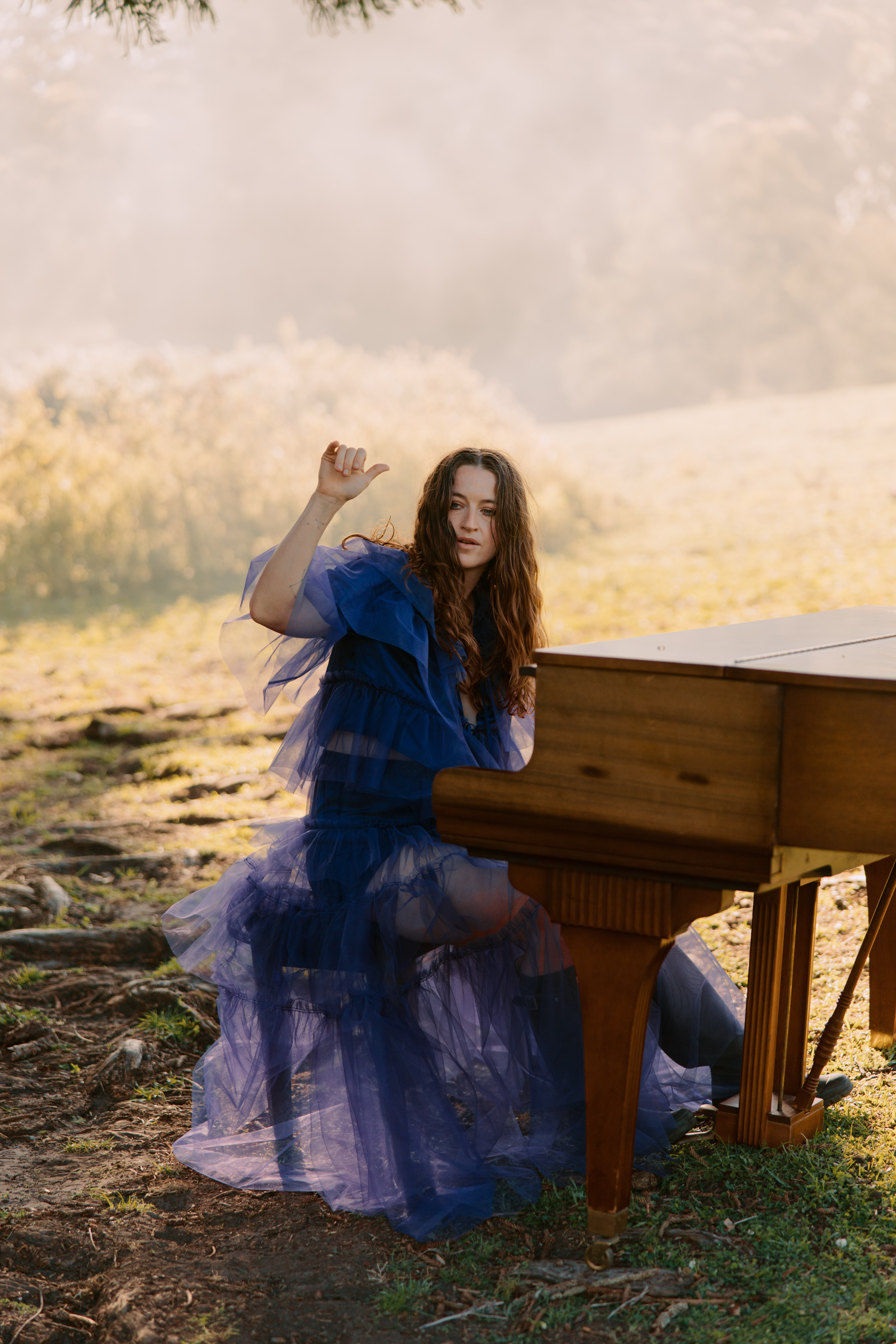
- Washington in 2025

Background information
- Also known as: Washington (2006–2014, 2020–2022); Megan Washington (2014–2020)
- Born: Megan Alexanda Washington; 7 January 1986 (age 40); Port Moresby, Papua New Guinea
- Origin: Brisbane, Queensland, Australia
- Genres: Indie pop; alternative rock
- Occupations: Musician; music producer; voice actor; screenwriter; film producer
- Instruments: Vocals; piano; guitar; keyboards
- Years active: 2006–present
- Label: Mercury/Universal
- Spouse: Nick Waterman (m. 2016)
- Website: meganwashington.com
- Children: 1

Megan Alexanda Washington (born 7 January 1986) is an Australian musician, songwriter and voice actor. She previously released music mononymously as Washington, as well as Megan Washington, before assuming her current moniker Meg Washington in 2022. Originally performing jazz music, her style shifted to indie pop and alternative rock. She has released five studio albums, I Believe You Liar (July 2010), There There (September 2014), Batflowers (August 2020), Hot Fuss (2022) and GEM (2025). Both I Believe You Liar and There There reached the top 5 on the ARIA Albums Chart and Batflowers peaked in the top 25. Outside of music, she has become a screenwriter and film producer. She also voices primary school teacher Calypso in the animated series Bluey.

Her music was described on I-D Vice as "sexy synth-laden pop" and in 2019 The Sydney Morning Herald's Anna Rose said of her intimate tour run, that "Washington's impressive command of her relatively small stage gave proof her music can work anywhere, anyway, any time". She has won three ARIA Music Awards with two in 2010 for I Believe You Liar, Best Female Artist and Breakthrough Artist – Release. The other win was Best Cover Art for Batflowers in 2020.

== Early life and education ==
Megan Alexanda Washington was born on 7 January 1986 in Port Moresby, Papua New Guinea to Australian parents. She grew up with her father, Rick Washington, a part-time DJ for "weddings, parties and balls"; her mother, Karen Amos, and an older sister named Sarah. Washington started primary school in Port Moresby and, in 1996, the family moved to Brisbane, where she attended a private all-girls school Moreton Bay College, from which she was expelled, and completed her final two years of secondary education at Sheldon College.

Washington developed a stutter just before primary school and explained that "The way that I speak is idiosyncratic because it's based on 20 years of 'loopholing', of avoiding words that trip me up. The only thing I still (she pauses briefly) have trouble with is sustained syllables – like s's and ts and fs together". Later she attended the Australian School of the Arts where she continued her interest in music. She studied for a Bachelor of Music degree at the Queensland University of Technology and then jazz voice at the Queensland Conservatorium of Music.

== Career ==
=== 2006–2009: Early career and EPs ===
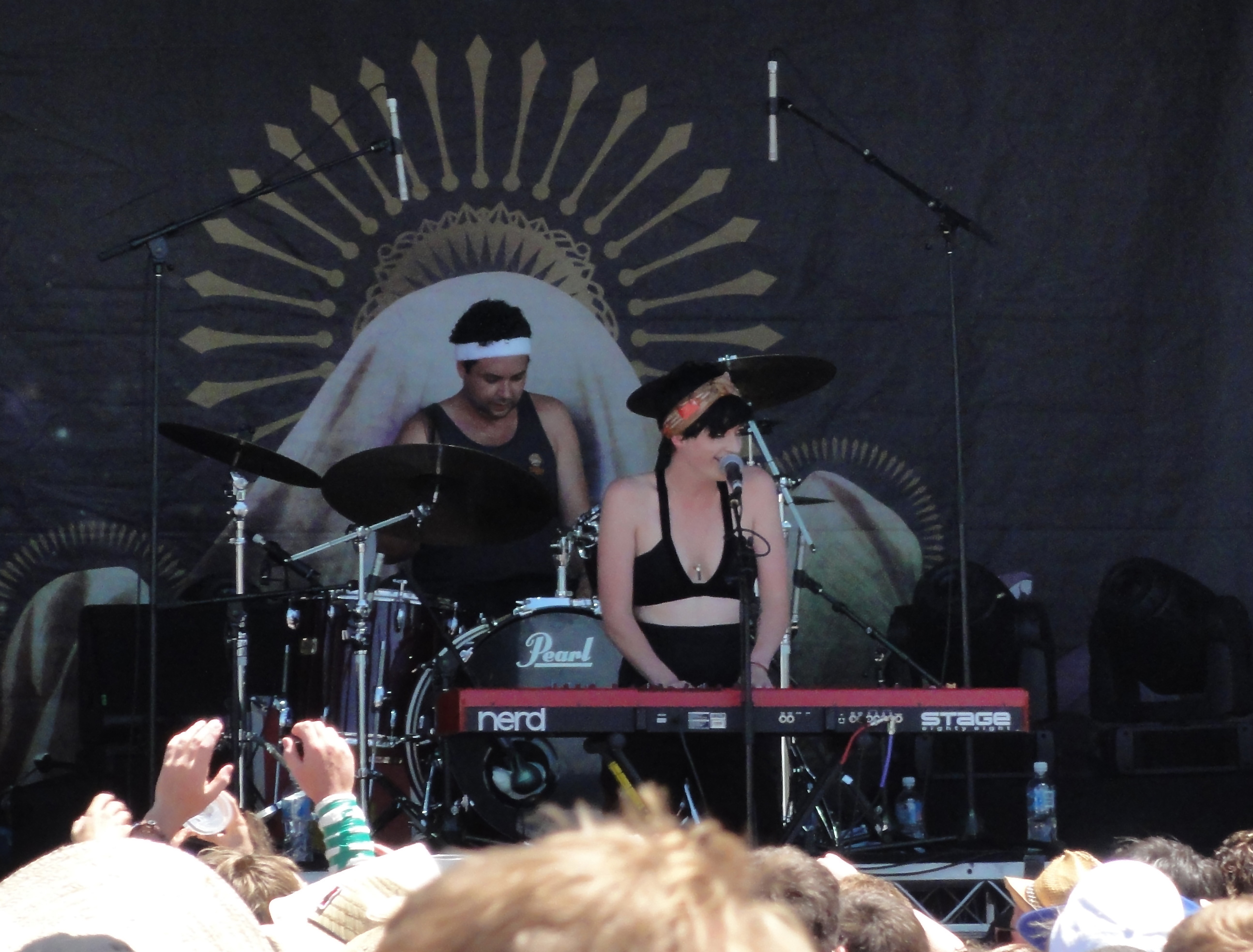
Washington at Big Day Out, January 2011

Washington, with jazz instrumentalist Sean Foran, recorded her six-track debut extended play, Nightlight, in April 2006 for the Newmarket Music record label. She supplied lead vocals, with Foran on piano, John Parker on drums, Chris Pickering on guitar and Sam Vincent on double bass; Pickering recorded and mixed the tracks. It was re-released in June 2009 and appeared on the ARIA Albums Chart at No. 53 in October that year. The EP won the 2008 Australian Jazz Bell Award for 'Best Australian Jazz Vocal Album'.

She followed with a second EP, Bennetts Lane, a collaboration with pianist Paul Grabowsky, which appeared in 2007. She acknowledged Grabowsky's assistance, "[I wrote] the lyrics while he wrote the music. He treated me as an equal – it was amazing". In January that year Washington had relocated to Melbourne and worked in a bagel shop and recalled that "It was not a good or glamorous time. And the irony is, across from the shop counter there was a huge plasma TV playing Australian film clips – so I'd see all my friend's clips all day and I'd be going, 'Would you like more cream cheese on your f---ing bagel?'"

Washington's music style moved from jazz when she backed a blues and roots musician, Old Man River, as keyboardist and harmony vocalist from 2006, including touring internationally in support of his debut album, Good Morning (March 2007). She also worked as keyboardist and backing vocalist for indie pop artist Ben Lee. In early 2008 she sang an acoustic cover version of Ross Wilson's "Bed of Nails" (1989), which was used as the theme song for three seasons of the ABC1 TV drama Bed of Roses (2008, 2010–2011). After Washington's commercial success, in early 2011 the track was released as a single by Ruby Entertainment.

In late 2008, Washington launched her mononymous band, Washington, with backing members John Castle on guitars, drums and bass guitar, Lance Ferguson (the Bamboos), Ross Irwin on vocals, Ryan Monro (the Cat Empire, Jackson Jackson) on bass guitar and Des White. The band released her third EP, the four-track effort Clementine, in January the following year. In November they were announced as Triple J's Unearthed winners and performed at the Melbourne leg of the Big Day Out.

Washington followed with a five-track fourth EP, How to Tame Lions, in September 2009; its lead track "Cement" and title track, received high rotation on youth radio Triple J. She provided vocals, piano, glockenspiel, synthesiser and guitar and was joined by Castle on guitar, bass guitar, drums, loops, tambo and autoharp. Castle engineered and mixed the work and co-produced it with Washington. Following appearances on Spicks and Specks in October and November that year, Washington attracted the attention of a wider audience. She observed that "You might think that most people get their information from the charts or something like that but I had so much great feedback after being on those shows". The EP reached the ARIA Charts top 100.

In December 2009, Washington won the inaugural Vanda & Young Global Songwriting Competition for the track "How to Tame Lions"; it is sponsored by the Australasian Performing Right Association (APRA) and the Australasian Mechanical Copyright Owners Society (AMCOS). In that month she backed Sia on guitar at the Palace Theatre and a few days later performed a duet with Keith Urban during his Rod Laver Arena concert in Melbourne. "Cement" was listed on the Triple J Hottest 100, 2009.

=== 2010–2012: I Believe You Liar to Insomnia ===
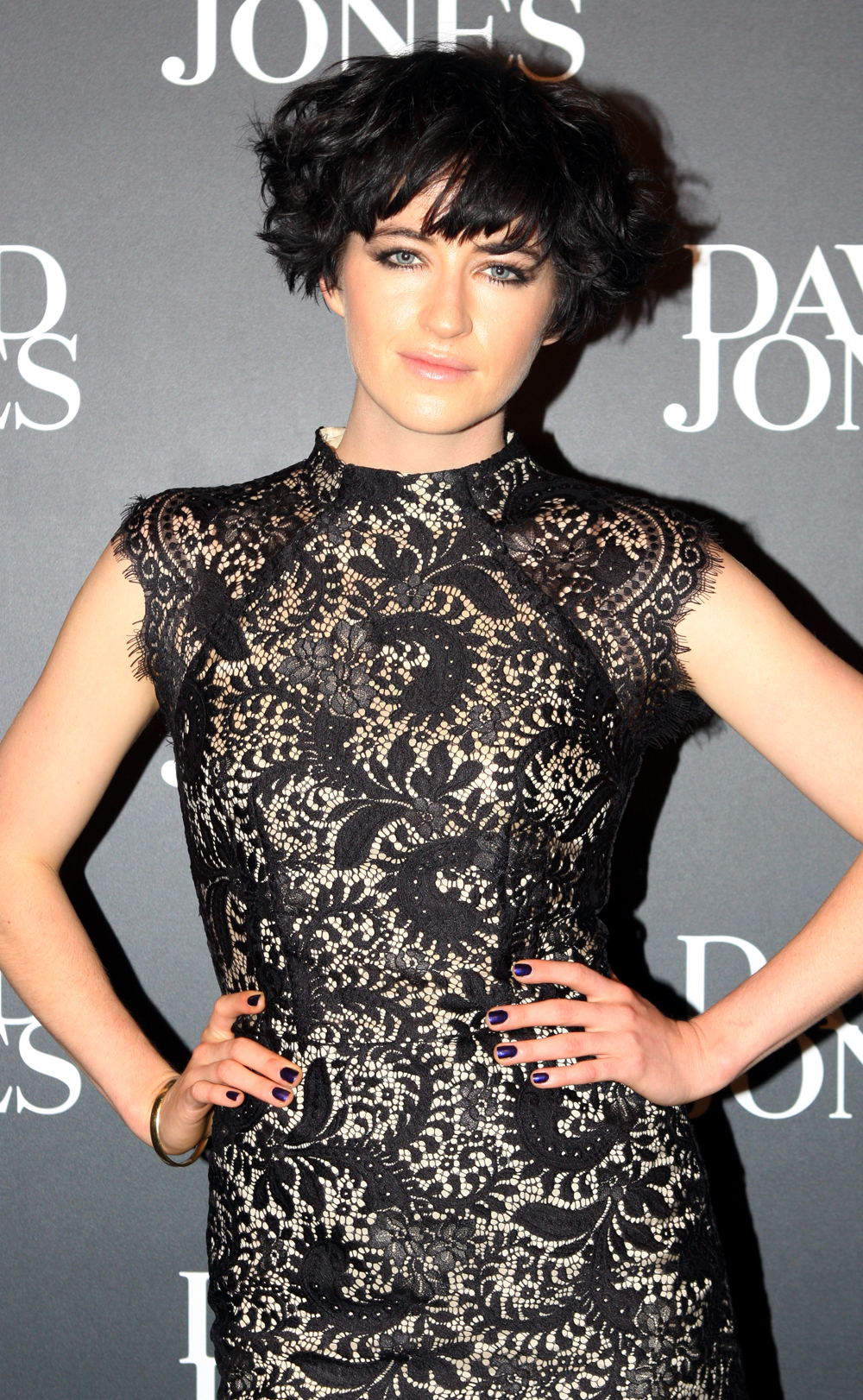
Washington in 2013

On 30 July 2010, Washington released her debut album, I Believe You Liar, on Universal Music Australia, which peaked at number three on the ARIA Albums Chart and, by the end of 2011, received platinum certification by ARIA for shipment of 70,000 copies. Three of its singles, "Rich Kids" (May 2010, also title track of an EP), "Sunday Best" (August) and "The Hardest Part" (October), were described by Australian musicologist, Ian McFarlane, "Although not chart hits, [they] were insistent and infectious, and when combined with her flamboyant, quirky stage presentation, heralded a major performer". All three tracks were listed on the Triple J Hottest 100, 2010.

In October 2010, Washington performed live during YouTube Play, curated in partnership by YouTube and the Guggenheim Museum. At the ARIA Music Awards of 2010 she won the Best Female Artist and Breakthrough Artist – Release for I Believe You Liar. She received further nominations for Album of the Year, Best Adult Alternative Album and Engineer of the Year (John Castle) for I Believe You Liar and the Single of the Year award for "How to Tame Lions".

Washington released an eight-track EP, Insomnia, on Mercury in October 2011, which peaked at No. 24 on the ARIA Albums Chart. Emma Green of Beat Magazine found it, "marks a change of pace from upbeat pop-oriented tracks to slow and enchanting melodies that could be pulled from the soundtrack to her deepest, darkest dreams… If the singer's insomnia did inspire this album then she should stay on the caffeine, because whatever she's doing is definitely working". VSounds reviewer, Corey Tonkin, noticed, "[it] includes some of [her] most accomplished songs yet. From 'Skeleton Key' onwards, her songs are hauntingly beautiful, with an atmosphere that you didn't quite get from I Believe You, Liar… Accompanied with her lyrics about difficult personal experiences, it creates this raw emotion which is quite powerful".

In January of the following year, she presented the album at the Sydney Opera House; Tanya Ali of The AU Review observed, "Seeing [her] perform these songs made you understand how emotionally draining they could be to sing. The heart and soul with which [she] told her stories melodically was astounding and heartbreaking to watch". Washington was a mentor for the inaugural season of Australia's version of TV talent show, The Voice, for members of Keith Urban's team. The show aired from April to June in 2012.

=== 2013–2015: There There ===
During January 2013 Washington and fellow musician, Tim Rogers (of You Am I), had the lead roles in a musical-thriller film, The Boy Castaways. The shooting schedule was for three weeks and it premiered at the Adelaide Film Festival in October of that year.

Following commitments of early 2013 Washington travelled to London from June of that year to work with Samuel Dixon, an Adelaide-born English-based musician and producer, to record her second album, There There (September 2014). The two met when she was touring in support of Sia and Dixon was in that artist's backing band. Washington wanted to incorporate a "late-60s, early-70s, gold lame Shirley Bassey sound with trumpets and James Bond-y melodies" for her album. Writing was completed in late 2012. She felt it was recorded in a "spirit of honesty".

Washington provided a duet, "Ghost", with Kate Miller-Heidke, on that artist's fourth studio album, O Vertigo! (March 2014). She had performed with Miller-Heidke at the Darwin Festival in 2012. Washington delivered a talk at the TEDxSydney event in May of that year: she explained how her stuttering hampers communication during conversation or speeches, but disappears when she sings. At the event she performed a new track, "To or not Let Go".

Upon release of There There, she described how the bold truthfulness that defined that talk was transferred across to the writing process for the album. Also in May 2014, she announced her involvement in an art book by Iranian-New Zealand artist, Nabil Sabio Azadi, For You the Maker. On Twitter she detailed how other contributors, Rick Owens and Limi Yamamoto, would also appear. Her second full-length album, was released through Universal Music, under her full name, which peaked at number five.

Australian Rolling Stone's reviewer, Darren Levin, rated it at four out-of five stars and explained, "'Do you want it back?' she asks the man she was supposed to marry, before devoting an entire verse to the awkward practicalities of an engagement gone sour. This man is not metaphorical, and neither is the marriage. Each song, says Washington, is connected to a real-life event – from the frank confession of infidelity on the raw ballad 'Begin Again' to 'Get Happy', where she falls in love over Eighties New Wave textures… On [this album], she's both fearless and direct".

It provided singles, "Who Are You" (February 2014), "Limitless" (May) and "My Heart Is a Wheel" (September); a music video was created for the latter. She explained that "My Heart Is a Wheel" was inspired by Kanye West's "Runaway". Co-producer Dixon told the media that the album is her, "saying … 'This happened and it's my fault.' She's putting her hand up and saying 'I stuffed up'" — he also praised the songwriter's courage. The singer-musician performed free "pop-up" shows in state capitals, Brisbane, Melbourne and Sydney, in support of There There during the week of release. A national tour, in February 2015, followed.

=== 2016–2019: Singles and touring ===
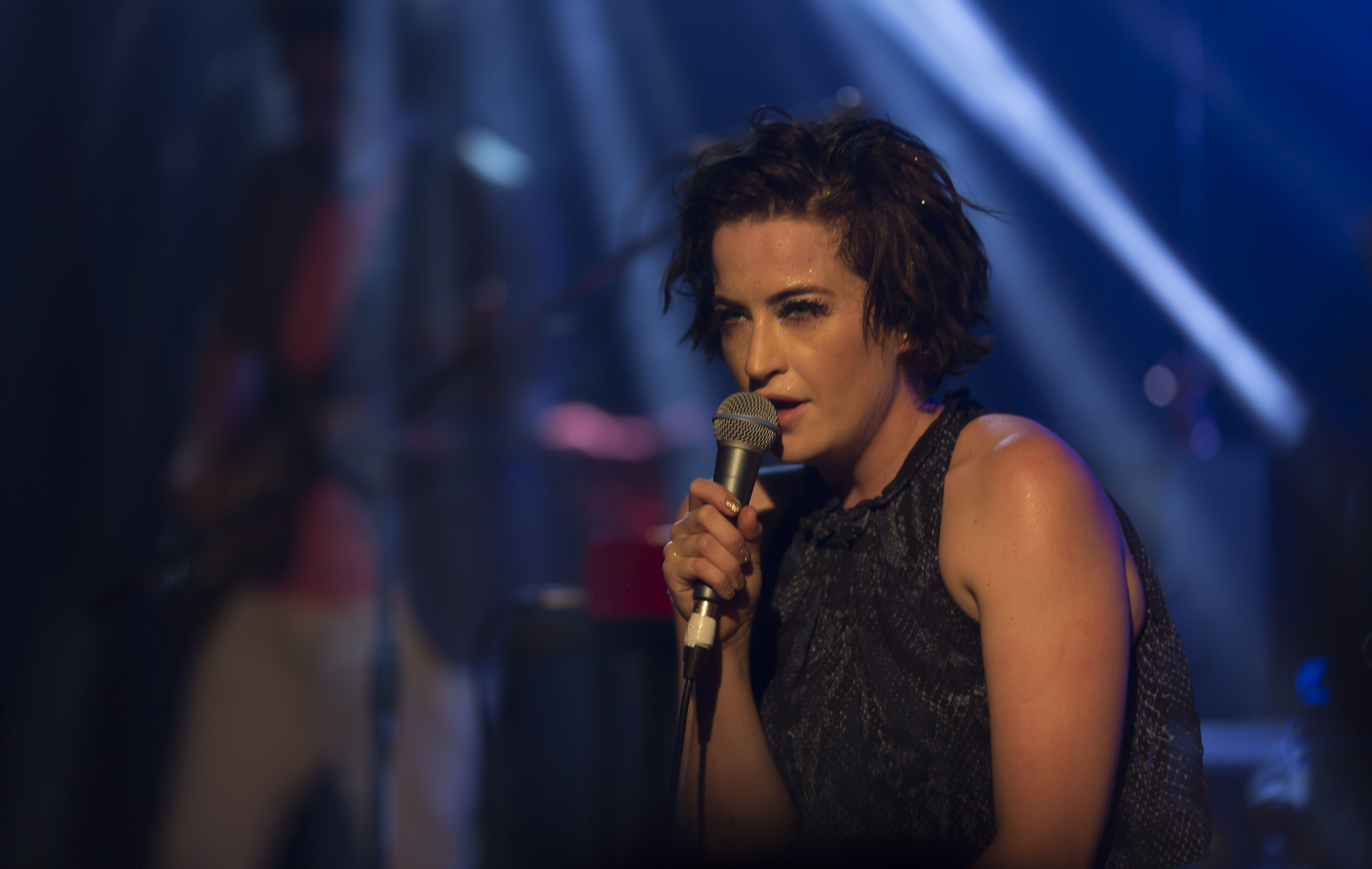
At the Metro Theatre, Sydney, February 2015

Washington released a single and music video, "Saint Lo", in November 2016. The song was supported heavily by triple J In September of the following year, the singer performed live with the Sydney Symphony Orchestra at the Sydney Opera House. In 2018, Washington started supplying the voice of Calypso, the title character's primary school teacher, on the ABC Kids TV cartoon series Bluey.

She premiered another single, "Claws", in November 2018. Pilerats' Hayden Davis observed, "[it] is a delicate, yet tall-standing return from [the singer] who, in all the years since her last work, has clearly not lost her stride… the single unites [her] catchy vocal pulse with a restrained production that glistens with its chiming melodies, something that she glides over the top of with ease". Her next single, "American Spirit", appeared in January 2019. Another single, "Dirty Churches", was produced by Dave Hammer (Lime Cordiale, Thundamentals) and was promoted by three intimate gigs. Washington launched an online song featuring Climate change advocate Greta Thunberg late 2019, according to Junkee, she created a "Passionate and angry work of art".

=== 2020–2024: Batflowers and Hot Fuss ===
In May 2020 Washington released a single and lyric video, "Dark Parts". The music video is hand drawn by Washington, featuring various animated characters from the track in a vertical format which Rolling Stone Australia's Tyler Jenke claimed "there's truly nothing that Megan Washington can't do". NME announced in June the video clip for "Dark Parts" and her third studio album Batflowers was due on 28 August. She issued the album's second single, "Switches", which uses a visualiser containing a title character from the album artwork for Batflowers. The album's third single, "Kiss Me Like We're Gonna Die", appeared in July, which she performed on ABC TV talk show, Q&A. Washington released a fourth single, "Achilles Heart", written with producer Rabitt (Andy Grammer, Charlotte Lawrence), also in July. She gave a live rendition of the track on YouTube which coincided with the announcement of her involvement in the 2020 Brisbane Festival.

Also in 2020 Washington appeared in CrossBread, a Christian Rock/Rap mockumentary, which she co-wrote for ABC Listen radio with Declan Fay and Chris Ryan (from King Kong: The Musical). In the musical docucomedy, Washington and Ryan appear as a brother-sister duo gigging unsuccessfully in Melbourne sometime in 2015, until they start to get some unlikely success on the Christian Music Scene. Kate McLennan (from Get Krack!n), comedian Aaron Chen, and John Waters (Play School and Rake) also have roles in this six-part show/podcast uploaded in June 2020.

Washington's album Batflowers was released on 28 August 2020, which reached the ARIA Albums Chart top 30. Joseph Earp of Junkee observed, "It is a breathless album, like the entirety of Washington's career condensed into one multi-coloured burst; a magnum opus, torn from somewhere very precious and important". At the 2020 ARIA Music Awards it won Best Cover Art, it was also nominated for the 2020 Australian Music Prize, and for the Reader's Award at the 2021 Rolling Stone Australia Awards The fifth single, "Batflowers" (August), was listed in the Top 40 Vanda & Young Global songwriting competition.

Russh launched the Live at The Tivoli series which was recorded at Washington's shows in September 2020 where The Australian noted of her voice: "That jaw dropping instrument in her throat was enough to send everyone off on a high". In early 2021, Washington released a cover of Powderfinger's "My Happiness" as a promotional advertisement for Brisbane, Australia. In 2022 she performed her EP Insomnia at Sydney Festival a decade on from the original performance.

In December 2022, Washington released Hot Fuss, a cover versions studio album of her renditions of the Killers' 2004 album of the same name. With Ben Lee she appeared as a contestant-performer on RocKwiz in March 2023; she performed her 2020 album track "Lazarus Drug" (solo) and a duet with Lee on "Stars Are Blind" as cover version of Paris Hilton's 2006 song. Washington and symphony orchestras in Tasmania, Sydney and Melbourne performed together in January and February 2024. "Lazarus Drug" was adapted and played during the final scene of "The Sign", a 28-minute episode of Bluey broadcast in April 2024.

Washington made a turn to film screenwriting by co-writing the screenplay (along with her husband Nick Waterman, who also served as director) to the 2024 drama How to Make Gravy, adapted from the song of the same name by Paul Kelly. Washington also played a supporting role in the film and made contributions to the film's soundtrack, with one of the contributions, "Fine", winning Washington the AACTA Award for Best Original Song.

=== 2025: GEM ===
In June 2025, Washington released "Kidding", the second single from her fifth studio album Gem, scheduled for release on 8 August 2025.

== Personal life ==
Washington moved from Brisbane to Sydney and followed with a relocation to Melbourne later in 2007. She explained, "I knew I had to move out of home, move to Melbourne and grow up".

Washington had a brief domestic relationship with Tim Rogers (of You Am I). However, "[it] ended before they made The Boy Castaways". She described how, "He's a great performer and I guess whatever history we share I've never been able to see him work, so it was amazing to see how good he is". She also reflected on her acting aspirations, "I had always acted through high school and at uni, and there was a time when I thought that was what I wanted to do, but then I got bitten by the jazz bug and here we are".

After the release of her debut album, Washington relocated to Brooklyn, New York City, in August 2011, which fulfilled a long-held goal. However, she recounted in 2014 that she was "dreadfully unhappy there", as she was unable to find any "meaning" in the constant "partying and drinking" that she engaged in and conceded "I would have been dreadfully unhappy" regardless of location at that time. She explained that she no longer sought therapy through her music, due to a relationship with a "good therapist": "My art doesn't have to play that role any more and probably my next record will be a disco record about trying to find a car park".

In 2017, Washington announced her marriage to filmmaker Nick Waterman, and the couple has a child, born around 2018. The pair had met in 2016 and were married 12 weeks later. By 2019 they returned to Brisbane to be close to extended family members.

== Discography ==
- I Believe You Liar (2010, as Washington)
- There There (2014, as Megan Washington)
- Batflowers (2020, as Washington)
- Hot Fuss (2022, as Meg Washington)
- GEM (2025, as Meg Washington)

== Awards and nominations ==
=== AACTA Awards ===
The Australian Academy of Cinema and Television Arts Awards is an awards ceremony to celebrate the best of Australian films and television.

Year	Nominee / work	Award	Result	Ref.
2025	How to Make Gravy	Best Film	Nominated	
2025	How to Make Gravy	Best Screenplay in Film	Nominated	
2025	How to Make Gravy	Best Soundtrack	Nominated	
2025	"Dream On" (Meg Washington) performed by Electric Fields & The Prison Choir)	Best Original Song	Nominated	
2025	"Fine" (Meg Washington) performed by Brendan Maclean & The Prison Choir	Best Original Song	Won	

=== APRA Awards ===
The APRA Music Awards are presented annually from 1982 by the Australasian Performing Right Association (APRA), "honouring composers and songwriters".

Year	Nominee / work	Award	Result	Ref.
2011	I Believe You Liar (Megan Washington)	Breakthrough Songwriter of the Year	Won	
2012	"Holy Moses" (Megan Washington / Jarrad Kritzstein)	Song of the Year	Shortlisted	

=== ARIA Music Awards ===
The ARIA Music Awards are presented annually from 1987 by the Australian Recording Industry Association (ARIA). Washington/Megan Washington has won three awards from thirteen nominations.

Year	Nominee / work	Award	Result	Ref.
2010	I Believe You Liar	Album of the Year	Nominated	
2010	I Believe You Liar	Best Female Artist	Won	
2010	I Believe You Liar	Best Adult Alternative Album	Nominated	
2010	I Believe You Liar	Breakthrough Artist – Release	Won	
2010	I Believe You Liar – John Castle	Engineer of the Year	Nominated	
2010	"How to Tame Lions"	Single of the Year	Nominated	
2011	"Holy Moses"	Best Female Artist	Nominated	
2011	"Holy Moses"	Best Pop Release	Nominated	
2012	Insomnia	Best Female Artist	Nominated	
2015	There There	Best Female Artist	Nominated	
2015	There There	Best Adult Contemporary Album	Nominated	
2020	Adam Dal Pozzo, Megan Washington and Michelle Pitiris for Batflowers	Best Cover Art	Won	
2020	"Just Jesus" (featuring Chris Ryan)	Best Comedy Release	Nominated	
2025	Gem	Best Adult Contemporary Album	Nominated	

=== Australian Jazz Bell Awards ===
The Australian Jazz Bell Awards, (also known as the Bell Awards or The Bells), are annual music awards for the jazz music genre in Australia. They commenced in 2003.

Year	Nominee / work	Award	Result
2008	Night Light	Best Australian Jazz Vocal Album	Won

=== Country Music Awards (CMAA) ===
The Country Music Awards of Australia (CMAA) (also known as the Golden Guitar Awards) is an annual awards night held in January during the Tamworth Country Music Festival, celebrating recording excellence in the Australian country music industry. They have been held annually since 1973.

Year	Nominee / work	Award	Result
2016	"Spirit of the Anzacs" (with Lee Kernaghan, Guy Sebastian, Jessica Mauboy, Jon Stevens, Shannon Noll and Sheppard)	Vocal Collaboration of the Year	Won
2016	"Spirit of the Anzacs" (with Lee Kernaghan, Guy Sebastian, Jessica Mauboy, Jon Stevens, Shannon Noll and Sheppard)	Video clip of the Year	Won

=== J Awards ===
The J Awards are an annual series of Australian music awards that were established by the Australian Broadcasting Corporation's youth-focused radio station Triple J. They commenced in 2005.

Year	Nominee / work	Award	Result
2010	Believe You Liar	Australian Album of the Year	Nominated
2010	"Sunday best" (directed by Mairi Cameron and Stephen Lance)	Australian Video of the Year	Won
2020	Meg Washington	Double J Artist of the Year	Nominated
2025	Meg Washington	Double J Artist of the Year	Nominated

=== Rolling Stone Australia Awards ===
The Rolling Stone Australia Awards are awarded annually in January or February by the Australian edition of Rolling Stone magazine for outstanding contributions to popular culture in the previous year.

Year	Nominee / work	Award	Result	Ref.
2012	Megan Washington	Best Female	Nominated	
2021	Megan Washington	Rolling Stone Reader's Award	Nominated	

=== Screen Music Awards ===
Year	Nominee / work	Award	Result	Ref.
2025	"Dream On" (Megan Washington) (by Electric Fields & The Prison Choir)	Best Original Song Composed for the Screen	Won	

=== Vanda & Young Global Songwriting Competition ===
The Vanda & Young Global Songwriting Competition is an annual competition that "acknowledges great songwriting whilst supporting and raising money for Nordoff-Robbins" and is coordinated by Albert Music and APRA AMCOS. It commenced in 2009. The prize included a cash grant of $50,000.

Year	Nominee / work	Award	Result
2009	"How to Tame Lions"	Vanda & Young Global Songwriting Competition	1st

== See also ==
- Arts and culture in Brisbane
