= List of Alpha Chi Sigma chapters =

Alpha Chi Sigma is an American professional fraternity for chemistry. In the following list, active chapters are indicated in bold and inactive chapters are indicated in italics.

Name	Charter date and range	Institution	Location	Status	Ref.
**Alpha**	December 11, 1902	University of Wisconsin–Madison	Madison, Wisconsin	Active	
**Beta**	April 22, 1904 – November 6, 1905; May 25, 1908	University of Minnesota	Minneapolis, Minnesota	Active	
**Gamma**	November 17, 1906 – March 21, 1971; April 28, 1979	Case Western Reserve University	Cleveland, Ohio	Active	
**Delta**	May 11, 1907	University of Missouri	Columbia, Missouri	Active	
**Epsilon**	February 22, 1908	Indiana University	Bloomington, Indiana	Active	
**Zeta**	May 27, 1907	University of Illinois Urbana-Champaign	Urbana, Illinois	Active	
Eta	June 2, 1908 – June 6, 1953; March 22, 1954 – May 11, 1972	University of Colorado Boulder	Boulder, Colorado	Inactive	
Theta	May 8, 1909 – June 12, 1934	University of Nebraska–Lincoln	Lincoln, Nebraska	Inactive	
**Iota**	May 10, 1909 – June 25, 1938; June 20, 1984	Rose–Hulman Institute of Technology	Terre Haute, Indiana	Active	
Kappa	May 29, 1909 – July 18, 2002	University of Kansas	Lawrence, Kansas	Inactive	
Lambda	April 11, 1910 – June 16, 1936	Ohio State University	Columbus, Ohio	Inactive	
**Mu**	April 11, 1911 – May 11, 1972; July 1, 2002	University of New Hampshire	Durham, New Hampshire	Active	
Nu	April 13, 1911 – April 27, 1996; May 1, 2000 – October 18, 2009	Pennsylvania State University	State College, Pennsylvania	Inactive	
Xi	May 8, 1911 – December 1, 1942	University of Maine	Orono, Maine	Inactive	
Omicron	May 11, 1912 – February 25, 1945	Harvard University	Cambridge, Massachusetts	Inactive	
Pi	May 11, 1911 – January 8, 2000	Syracuse University	Syracuse, New York	Inactive	
**Rho**	May 6, 1912	University of North Carolina at Chapel Hill	Chapel Hill, North Carolina	Active	
**Sigma**	January 16, 1913	University of California, Berkeley	Berkeley, California	Active	
**Tau**	February 1, 1913	Cornell University	Ithaca, New York	Active	
Upsilon	March 29, 1913 – February 12, 1968; January 9, 1998 – July 15, 2005	Northwestern University	Evanston, Illinois	Inactive	
Phi	May 31, 1914 – November 19, 1934	Allegheny College	Meadville, Pennsylvania	Inactive	
Chi	January 31, 1914 – January 19, 1968	Yale University	New Haven, Connecticut	Inactive	
Psi	May 28, 1914 – May 12, 1986	Louisiana State University	Baton Rouge, Louisiana	Inactive	
Omega	June 12, 1915 – June 13, 1945	University of Pittsburgh	Pittsburgh, Pennsylvania	Inactive	
**Alpha Alpha**	1916	Stanford University	Stanford, California	Inactive	
**Alpha Beta**	1916	University of Michigan	Ann Arbor, Michigan	Active	
**Alpha Gamma**	1917–1970; April 21, 2017	University of Kentucky	Lexington, Kentucky	Active	
Alpha Delta	1917–1974	University of Cincinnati	Cincinnati, Ohio	Inactive	
Alpha Epsilon	1917–2024	Washington University in St. Louis	St. Louis, Missouri	Inactive	
Alpha Zeta	1919–1954; 19xx ?–2009	Massachusetts Institute of Technology	Cambridge, Massachusetts	Inactive	
Alpha Eta	1919–1969	University of Oklahoma	Norman, Oklahoma	Inactive	
**Alpha Theta**	1921	University of Iowa	Iowa City, Iowa	Active	
Alpha Iota	1921–1972	University of Pennsylvania	Philadelphia, Pennsylvania	Inactive	
**Alpha Kappa**	1922	University of Virginia	Charlottesville, Virginia	Active	
Alpha Lambda	1923–1933	Dartmouth College	Hanover, New Hampshire	Inactive	
Alpha Mu	1923–1933	Lafayette College	Easton, Pennsylvania	Inactive	
Alpha Nu	1924–1955	Colgate University	Hamilton, New York	Inactive	
**Alpha Pi**	1926	George Washington University	Washington, D.C.	Active	
Alpha Xi	1925–1957	University of Utah	Salt Lake City, Utah	Inactive	
Alpha Omicron	1926–1959	Montana State University	Bozeman, Montana	Inactive	
**Alpha Rho**	1927	University of Maryland, College Park	College Park, Maryland	Active	
Alpha Sigma	1928–2022	University of Arkansas	Fayetteville, Arkansas	Inactive	
Alpha Tau	1928–1971	Tulane University	New Orleans, Louisiana	Inactive	
**Alpha Upsilon**	1928	Michigan State University	East Lansing, Michigan	Active	
Alpha Phi	1929–1985; 19xx ?–1995	University of Tennessee	Knoxville, Tennessee	Inactive	
Alpha Chi	1929–1968	Iowa State University	Ames, Iowa	Inactive	
Alpha Psi	1930–1985	Illinois Institute of Technology	Chicago, Illinois	Inactive	
**Alpha Omega**	1932	Georgia Tech	Atlanta, Georgia	Active	
Beta Alpha	1932–1969	Bucknell University	Lewisburg, Pennsylvania	Inactive	
Beta Beta	1933–1974; 19xx ?–1993	Washington State University	Pullman, Washington	Inactive	
**Beta Gamma**	1934	University of California, Los Angeles	Los Angeles, California	Active	
**Beta Delta**	1936	Missouri University of Science and Technology	Rolla, Missouri	Active	
Beta Epsilon	1939–1956	Clemson University	Clemson, South Carolina	Inactive	
Beta Zeta	1952–1965	University of Alabama	Tuscaloosa, Alabama	Inactive	
Beta Eta	1953–2022	University of North Texas	Denton, Texas	Inactive	
Beta Theta	1952–1985; 19xx ?–2000	University of Texas at Austin	Austin, Texas	Inactive	
**Beta Iota**	1953–1974; 2014	University of Florida	Gainesville, Florida	Active	
**Beta Kappa**	1954–1965	University of Delaware	Newark, Delaware	Collegiate Group	(Note: Collegiate Group (reactivation) of Delta Iota chapter.)
Beta Lambda	1954–1984	University of Akron	Akron, Ohio	Inactive	
**Beta Mu**	1954	Occidental College	Los Angeles, California	Active	
**Beta Nu**	1955	Purdue University	West Lafayette, Indiana	Active	
Beta Xi	1955–1972	Wayne State University	Detroit, Michigan	Inactive	
Beta Omicron	1958–2000	University of Houston	Houston, Texas	Inactive	
**Beta Pi**	1960	University of the Pacific	Stockton, California	Active	
**Beta Rho**	1965	Kansas State University	Manhattan, Kansas	Active	
**Beta Sigma**	1966	Rochester Institute of Technology	Rochester, New York	Active	
Beta Tau	1967–2022	University of Arizona	Tucson, Arizona	Inactive	
Beta Upsilon	1969–1977; 19xx ?–2001	American University	Washington, D.C.	Inactive	
**Beta Phi**	1970	South Dakota School of Mines and Technology	Rapid City, South Dakota	Active	
**Beta Chi**	1972	Hampden–Sydney College	Farmville, Virginia	Active	
**Beta Psi**	1975	Southern Illinois University	Carbondale, Illinois	Active	
Beta Omega	1975–2007	Arizona State University	Tempe, Arizona	Inactive	
Gamma Alpha	1976–1981	Johns Hopkins University	Baltimore, Maryland	Inactive	
**Gamma Beta**	1978	Florida State University	Tallahassee, Florida	Active	
Gamma Gamma	1980–1986	Eastern Michigan University	Ypsilanti, Michigan	Inactive	
**Gamma Delta**	1981	College of Charleston	Charleston, South Carolina	Active	
Gamma Epsilon	1981–1990	Vanderbilt University	Nashville, Tennessee	Inactive	
**Gamma Zeta**	1982	California Polytechnic State University, San Luis Obispo	San Luis Obispo, California	Active	
**Gamma Eta**	1985	Marshall University	Huntington, West Virginia	Active	
**Gamma Theta**	1985	Truman State University	Kirksville, Missouri	Active	
**Gamma Iota**	1987	Virginia Tech	Blacksburg, Virginia	Active	
**Gamma Kappa**	1991	James Madison University	Harrisonburg, Virginia	Active	
Gamma Lambda	1996–2005	Southeastern Oklahoma State University	Durant, Oklahoma	Inactive	
Gamma Mu	1997–2001	Northern Arizona University	Flagstaff, Arizona	Inactive	
**Gamma Nu**	2000	Ohio University	Athens, Ohio	Active	
**Gamma Xi**	2003	North Carolina State University	Raleigh, North Carolina	Active	
Gamma Omicron	2003–2020	Lehigh University	Bethlehem, Pennsylvania	Inactive	
Gamma Pi	2004–2012	University of Washington	Vancouver, Washington	Inactive	
Gamma Rho	2005–2010	Loyola University New Orleans	New Orleans, Louisiana	Inactive	
Gamma Sigma	2006–2011	Kent State University	Kent, Ohio	Inactive	
**Gamma Tau**	2006	Indiana University of Pennsylvania	Indiana, Pennsylvania	Active	
**Gamma Upsilon**	2006	Duquesne University	Pittsburgh, Pennsylvania	Active	
Gamma Phi	2010–2016	University at Buffalo	Buffalo, New York	Inactive	
**Gamma Chi**	2011	Longwood University	Farmville, Virginia	Active	
Gamma Psi	2012–2023	University of Toledo	Toledo, Ohio	Inactive	
**Gamma Omega**	2012	Widener University	Chester, Pennsylvania	Active	
**Delta Alpha**	2012	University of Rhode Island	Kingston, Rhode Island	Active	
**Delta Beta**	2013	Alcorn State University	Alcorn State, Mississippi	Active	
Delta Gamma	2014–2021	Georgia Southern University	Statesboro, Georgia	Inactive	
**Delta Delta**	2014	Southeast Missouri State University	Cape Girardeau, Missouri	Active	
**Delta Epsilon**	2015	Boston University	Boston, Massachusetts	Active	
**Delta Zeta**	2016	Christopher Newport University	Newport News, Virginia	Active	
Delta Eta	2017–2020	University of New Orleans	New Orleans, Louisiana	Inactive	
Delta Theta	2017–2023	Albion College	Albion, Michigan	Inactive	
**Delta Iota**	2017	Thomas Jefferson University East Falls	Philadelphia, Pennsylvania	Active	
**Delta Kappa**	2018	University of Richmond	Richmond, Virginia	Active	
**Delta Lambda**	2018	University of California-Irvine	Irvine, California	Active	
**Delta Mu**	2018	Kettering University	Flint, Michigan	Active	
Delta Nu	2018–2021	Northern Illinois University	DeKalb, Illinois	Inactive	
Delta Xi	2018–2022	University of Tampa	Tampa, Florida	Inactive	
Delta Omicron	2018–2021	Florida A&M University	Tallahassee, Florida	Inactive	
Delta Pi	2019–2021	York College of Pennsylvania	York, Pennsylvania	Inactive	
Delta Rho	2020–2021	Oregon State University	Corvallis, Oregon	Inactive	
**Delta Sigma**	2022	High Point University	High Point, North Carolina	Active	
