= Alpha Chi Sigma =

American professional fraternity for chemistry

- ΑΧΣ
- Founded: December 11, 1902; 122 years ago University of Wisconsin–Madison
- Type: Professional
- Affiliation: PFA
- Former affiliation: PIC
- Status: Active
- Scope: National
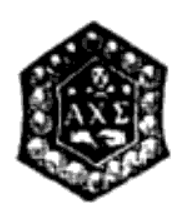
- Member badge
- Colors: Prussian blue, Chrome yellow
- Flower: Red carnation
- Mascot: Wyvern
- Publication: The HEXAGON
- Chapters: 56 collegiate 7 professional; 15 groups
- Colonies: 1
- Headquarters: 6296 Rucker Road Suite B Indianapolis, Indiana 46220; United States
- Website: www.alphachisigma.org

Alpha Chi Sigma (ΑΧΣ) is a professional fraternity specializing in the fields of the chemical sciences. It has both collegiate and professional chapters throughout the United States consisting of both men and women and numbering more than 78,000 members. The fraternity aims to bring together students and professionals pursuing a wide variety of chemistry-related careers.

== History ==
=== Founding ===
The Alpha Chi Sigma fraternity was organized at the University of Wisconsin–Madison by a group of undergraduates who were fellow students in chemistry at that time. Later documents set the date of founding as December 11, 1902. The founders were:

- Raymond Tracy Conger
- Harold Everett Eggers
- Joseph Gerard Holty
- Alfred Emil Kundert
- Joseph Howard Mathews
- Edward Gustav Mattke
- Bart Eldred McCormick
- Frank Joseph Petura
- James Chisholm Silverthorn

== Purpose ==
The Three Objects of Alpha Chi Sigma:

1. To bind its members with a tie of true and lasting friendship.
2. To strive for the advancement of chemistry both as a science and as a profession.
3. To aid its members by every honorable means in the attainment of their ambitions as chemists throughout their mortal lives.

The Five Obligations of a Member:

1. That a member will remember the Objects of the Fraternity and endeavor always to further them.
2. That a member will pay promptly all financial obligations.
3. That a member will act so as never to be a reproach to Alpha Chi Sigma.
4. That a member will cheerfully fulfill any assigned fraternal tasks.
5. That a member will maintain as satisfactory a scholastic record as possible.

== Symbols ==
The fraternity's colors are Prussian blue and chrome yellow. The colors were selected because of their history as chemical compounds. Prussian blue consists of iron (III) ferrocyanide and was first created in 1704 by Heinrich Diesbach. Chrome yellow was discovered by Nicolas-Louis Vauquelin in 1797 in the mineral croncoite and consists of lead chromate. The fraternity's flower is the red carnation and its symbolic mascot is the Wyvern.

The fraternity's badge is hexagon-shaped, symbolizing the basic structural symbol for aromatic compounds. It features the Greek letters ΑΧΣ, with shaking hands below and a skull and cross bones and two stars above. There is also a hexagon-shaped pledge pin with the symbol for lead (see the table below). Its professional charm is a slightly larger version of the badge. There is also a recognition pin for professional members that consists of a monogram of the Greek letters ΑΧΣ.

Its coat of arms includes a shield with a Prussian blue background that is bisected by a diagonal chrome yellow bar that features the symbols of the seven metals of the Ancients. Above the bar are three stars arranged in a triangle. Below the bar is a Wyvern, a mythical creature. There is a motto ribbon below the shield in chrome yellow, with the fraternity's name in Prussian blue. There is a lambrequin or mantling drapped on either side of the shield. Above the shield is a torse with six knots in the fraternity colors and the crest which is an alchemical symbol.

The seven metals of the Ancients are gold, silver, iron, mercury, tin, copper, and lead. These symbols correspond to planets, gods, and days of the week.

Metal	Gold	Silver	Iron	Mercury	Tin	Copper	Lead
God/celestial body	Sol/Sun	Luna/Moon	Mars	Mercury	Jupiter	Venus	Saturn
Day of the week	Sunday	Monday	Tuesday	Wednesday	Thursday	Friday	Saturday

Member John Baer designed the Alpha Chi Sigma flag in 1946. It has a field of Prussian blue and symbols in chrome yellow, including three stars that are arranged in a triangle in the upper left-hand corner, a central hexagon with letters ΑΧΣ, and the Greek letters for the individual chapter in the lower right corner. The flag for the Grand Chapter features the ancient symbol for gold in the lower right corner.

The fraternity also has a tartan that was designed by R. Scott Wilson. The tartan includes a dark blue background and red, white, and yellow lines. The yellow lines are groups in threes to represent the Three Objects of the fraternity and in sixes to represent the six sides of the hexagon. The red represents the fraternity's flower. The combination of red and white recalls the school colors of the Alpha chapter at the University of Wisconsin–Madison. In addition, there is a grouping of two white lines to represent 1902, the founding year of the fraternity.

== Chapters ==
=== Professional chapters and groups ===
In any geographic area, five or more Alpha Chi Sigma professionals may petition the Grand Recorder to establish themselves as a professional group. After the guidelines set up in the bylaws are fulfilled, the group can petition the Supreme Council to grant it chapter status. Each chapter draws its name from the city or area in which it exists.

- Atlanta Professional Group
- Bluegrass Professional Group
- Boston Professional Group
- Cincinnati Professional Group
- Delaware Valley Professional Chapter
- Detroit Professional Group
- Indianapolis Professional Chapter
- Kansas City Professional Chapter
- Las Vegas Professional Group
- Los Angeles Professional Group
- Mid-Missouri Professional Group
- New Jersey Professional Group
- Northstar Professional Group
- Omaha Professional Group
- Pittsburgh Professional Group
- Research Triangle Park Professional Chapter
- San Diego Professional Group
- Southwest Virginia Professional Group
- St. Louis Professional Chapter
- Washington, D.C. Professional Chapter
- Wisconsin Professional Group

== See also ==
- Professional fraternities and sororities
