= Engineer's blue =

Paste to assist accurate mating of surfaces

Engineer's blue (also known as scraping blue, Prussian blue, or simply bluing) is a highly pigmented paste used to assist in the mating of two or more components. It is applied to one of two surfaces that typically are required to be in perfect contact, for example a surface being processed to be flat and a standard perfectly flat surface. The blue is transferred only in places where the surfaces are in contact, revealing where work must be done.

== History ==
Joseph Whitworth popularized the first practical method of making accurate flat surfaces, during the 1830s, by using engineer's blue and scraping techniques on three trial surfaces. Prior to his scraping technique, the same three plate method was employed using polishing techniques, giving less accurate results. This improvement led to an explosion of development of precision instruments using these flat surface generation techniques as a basis for further construction of precise shapes.

== Preparation ==
Engineer's blue is prepared by mixing Prussian blue with a non-drying oily material (for example, grease). The coloured oil is rubbed onto a reference surface, and the workpiece is then rubbed against the coloured reference; non-uniform transfer by contact of the pigment indicates high and low regions on the workpiece. This method is used, for example, to test the flatness of surfaces and the trueness of a bearing assembly. The fitter may be told to "blue it up".

== Use in toolmaking ==
Prussian blue is widely used by tool makers when the core and cavity of a mould are matched during final assembly. It is also used in other tooling applications, especially during assembly, such as stamping and pressure die casting tools. A thin coating of Prussian blue is applied (usually with a paint brush) on the "insert", regardless of the shape or contour of the mould or tool before the matching is done with the mating part. If the Prussian blue (generally called just "blue") appears evenly on the mating area, it is considered as "good matching". Usually no tool would be transferred to testing or production without "blue matching", (a term generally used by tool makers in Asia). Engineer's blue checking is considered an integral part of precision tool making.
