= Johann Jacob Diesbach =

German painter

Johann Jacob Diesbach (German: [ˈdiːsbax]) (born around 1670 – died in 1748), was a German pigment and dye producer known for first synthesizing a blue pigment known as Prussian blue (i.e. iron blue or Berlin blue).

== Biography ==
Diesbach was born into a Swiss Bernese Patrician family Palatinate, and arrived in Berlin, Germany around 1701. Between 1704 and 1706, Diesbach was working as a paint manufacturer in Berlin. He was using an extract of crushed cochineal insects, iron sulphate and potash to create cochineal red lake. One batch of the product unexpectedly turned pale pink. When he tried to concentrate the mixture, it turned purple, then deep blue. He sought out the seller of the potash, Johann Konrad Dippel, an alchemist. Together, they realized that the reaction had occurred because the potash had been contaminated with bone oil.

Neither Diesbach nor Dippel knew what exactly happened chemically, they had inadvertently created the first modern synthetic pigment. This was an important invention, because at that time, the available blue pigments were either not very successful or were not affordable for large scale use.

The pigment was first mentioned in a letter, the first of several, from Frisch to the president of the Royal Academy of Sciences, Gottfried Wilhelm Leibniz, dated March 1708. By August 1709, the pigment was being referred to as "Preussisch Blau" and by November of that year, as "Berlinisch Blau".
