= Hand scraper =

Hand tool for scraping a surface

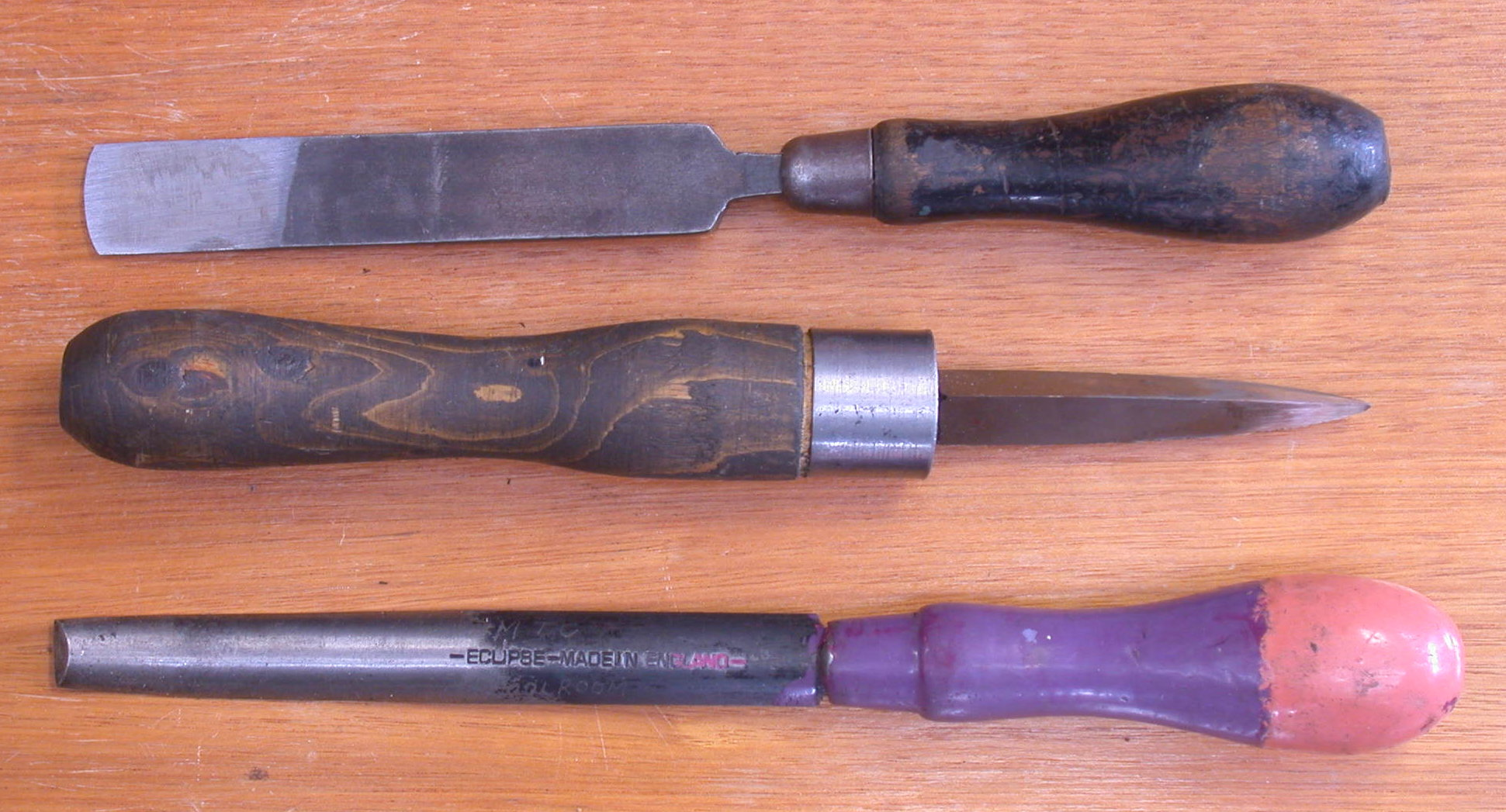
Three different engineering hand scrapers

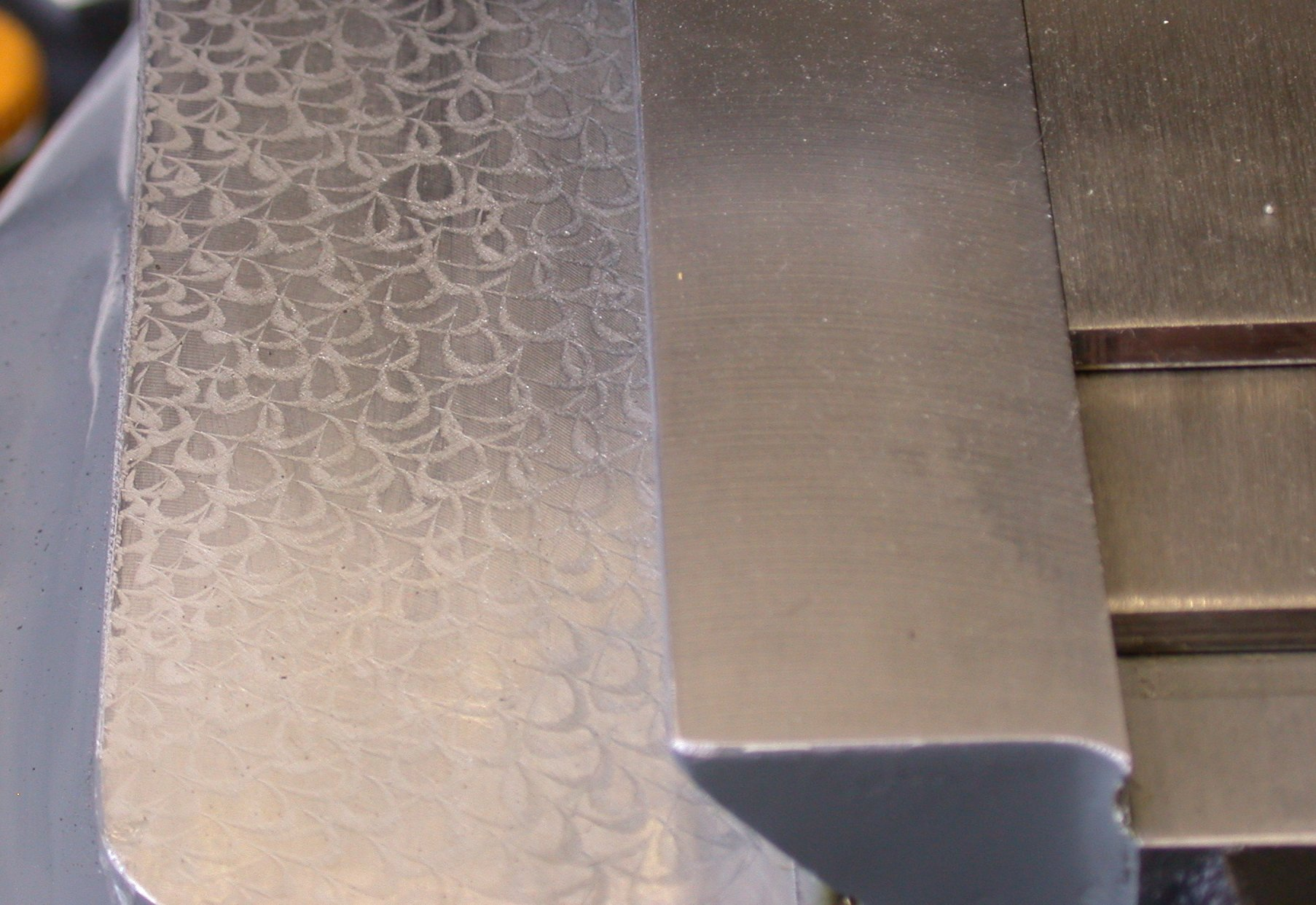
Appearance of a slideway frosted for improved oil retention

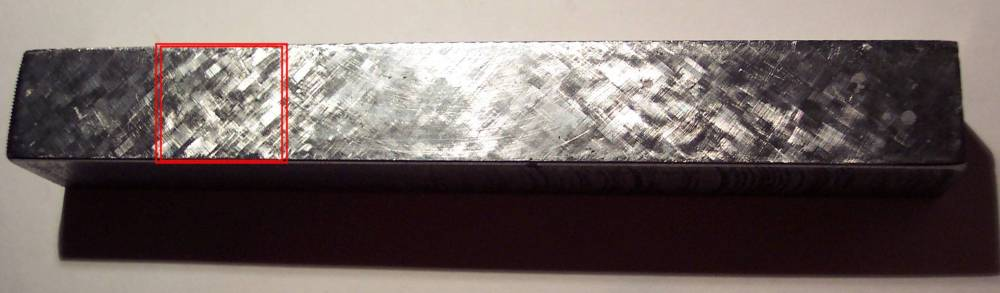
An example of a finely scraped 6 × 1 inch standard

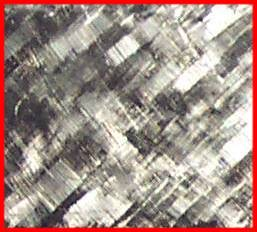
Close up of the surface showing the crossed scrape marks

End view showing the smoothness of the surface. For surfaces intended to be load bearing, "frosting" could then be applied on top of a surface like this if desired

A hand scraper is a single-edged tool used to scrape metal or other materials from a surface. This may be required where a surface needs to be trued, corrected for fit to a mating part, retain oil (usually on a freshly ground surface), or be given a decorative finish.

Surface plates were traditionally made by scraping. Three raw cast surface plates (plates that have been "seasoned" by having their residual stress relieved and receiving suitable surface treatments, but which remain unfinished), a flat scraper (as pictured at the top of the image), and a quantity of engineer's blue (or red lead) were all that was required in the way of tools.

The scraper in the center of the image is a three corner scraper and is typically used to deburr holes or the internal surface of bush-type bearings. Bushes are typically made from bronze or a white metal.

The scraper pictured at the bottom is a curved scraper. It has a slight curve in its profile and is also suitable for bush bearings, typically the longer ones.

One advantage of scraping is the ability to take the tool to the workpiece; this can be useful when the workpiece weighs several tons and is difficult to move.

It is done by using a precision surface such as a surface plate or a straightedge as a standard (a straightedge in this context is not a ruler; it is a miniature surface plate of extreme accuracy). The standard is coated with a very thin coating of a material such as Prussian blue. The workpiece and standard are touched together by gravity alone, and the high spots on the work piece are colored by the dye on the standard. These high spots are scraped off and the process is repeated until there is an even spread of high spots which total about 60% or more of the surface area. Coarse scraping gives a resulting surface with 5-10 points per square inch while fine scraping yields 24-36 points per square inch. If desired, the surface can then be "frosted". A surface prepared in this way is superior in overall accuracy to any prepared by machining or grinding operations, although lapping can equal or exceed it over small distances. Grinding and machining stresses the metal thermally and mechanically, while scraping and lapping do not.

Scraping is the only method for producing an original set of flat surfaces whose accuracy can be transferred through to other surfaces by means of grinding. Lapping and grinding do not achieve the long-distance flatness that scraping can, as they act on the entire surface rather than local high or low spots.

With precision-ground surfaces, any oil film applied to the surface will lack the means to adhere to the surface, especially between two mating parts of exceptional finish. The oil film will instead be swept away, leaving nothing but bare metal and the risk of seizure. Carefully scraping the surface will leave the original high-quality surface intact while providing many shallow depressions where the oil film can maintain its depth and surface tension. When scraping is used for this purpose, it is more accurately called "frosting", "spotting", or "flaking" as opposed to fully scraping an accurate surface. Typically, a scraped surface is scraped to highly accurate flatness, and then "frosting" is applied over it for oil retention. It is claimed to stop the so-called "stick-slip" phenomenon where a machine member might move in a jerky fashion rather than moving smoothly, allowing vibration and chatter. Such frosting will increase oil retention but will also drastically reduce bearing area and capacity. There is no possibility of achieving hydrodynamic bearing performance on normal sliding machine ways. The velocity is far too low. Most of the time, the ways will run under boundary lubrication conditions, while at the highest speeds, it might achieve mixed lubrication. This makes oil additives important in ways lubrication. However, this view is somewhat contradicted by the external link "Scraping methods".

Hand scraping leaves a distinctive pattern on the scraped surface. This can be suggestive of a high level of precision in the ways; however, sometimes a surface can be marked to appear hand scraped, but it is really just a superficial surface treatment designed to give the impression of a scraped machine way.

Hand scraping can also be done by a power tool that has a reciprocating blade and is usually adjustable for stroke length and number of strokes per minute.

== Bibliography ==
- Moore, Wayne R. (1970), Foundations of Mechanical Accuracy (1st ed.), Bridgeport, Connecticut, USA: Moore Tool Company, Inc., LCCN 73127307. Moore's monograph is a seminal classic of the principles of machine tool design and construction that yield the highest possible accuracy and precision in machine tools. The Moore firm epitomizes the art and science of the tool and die maker.
