= Whitewash =

Paint made from lime and chalk

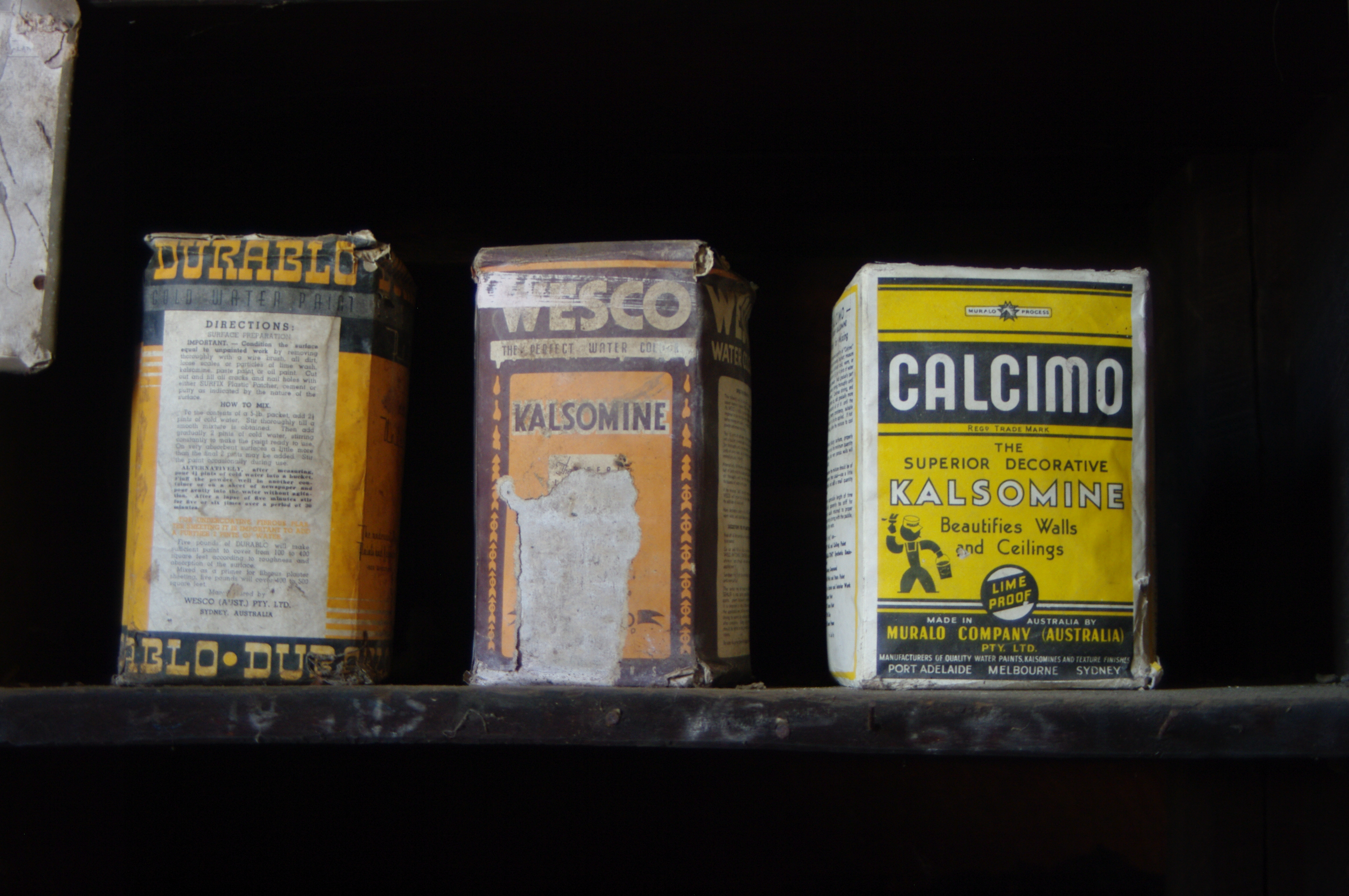
Three different brands of kalsomine

Whitewash, calcimine, kalsomine, calsomine, asbestis or lime paint is a type of paint made from slaked lime (calcium hydroxide, Ca(OH)_{2}) or chalk (calcium carbonate, CaCO_{3}), sometimes known as "whiting". Various other additives are sometimes used.

The term whitewashing is derived from the product.

== Use as paint ==
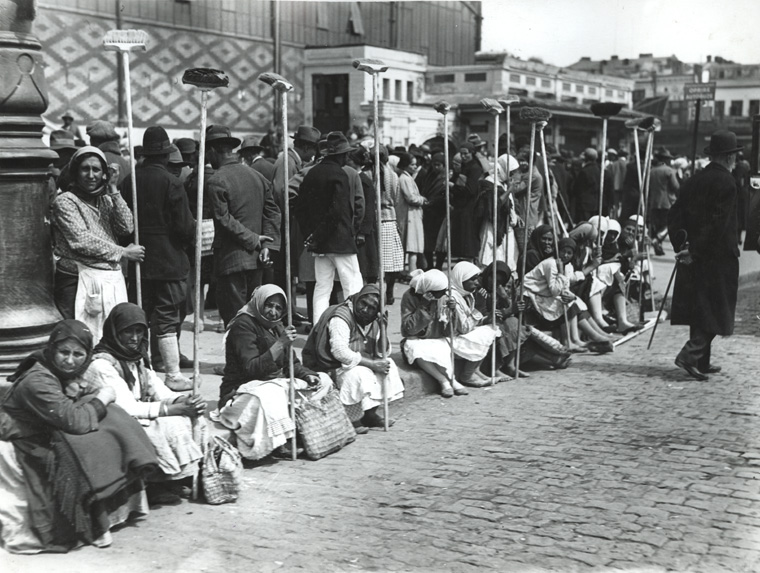
Whitewashers, photographed by Nicolae Ionescu, 1928

Whitewash cures through a reaction with carbon dioxide in the atmosphere to form calcium carbonate in the form of calcite, a type of reaction generally known as carbonation or by the more specific term, carbonatation.

It is usually applied to exteriors, or interiors of rural dairies because of its mildly antibacterial properties. Whitewash can be tinted for decorative use and is sometimes painted inside structures such as the hallways of apartment buildings. A small amount can rub off onto clothing. In Britain and Ireland, whitewash was used historically in interiors and exteriors of workers' cottages and still retains something of this association with rural poverty. In the United States, a similar attitude is expressed in the old saying "Too proud to whitewash and too poor to paint." The historic California Missions were commonly whitewashed, giving them their distinctive bright white appearance.

Whitewash is especially compatible with masonry because it is absorbed easily and the resultant chemical reaction hardens the medium.

Lime wash is pure slaked lime in water. It produces a unique surface glow due to the double refraction of calcite crystals. Limewash and whitewash both cure to become the same material.

When whitewash or limewash is initially applied, it has very low opacity, which can lead novices to overthicken the paint. Drying increases opacity and subsequent curing increases opacity even further.

Limewash relies on being drawn into a substrate unlike a modern paint that adheres to the surface. The process of being drawn in needs to be controlled by damping down. If a wall is not damped, it can leave the lime and pigments on the surface powdery; if the wall is saturated, then there is no surface tension and this can result in failure of the limewash. Damping down is not difficult but it does need to be considered before application of the limewash.

=== Additives ===
Additives traditionally used include water glass, glue, egg white, Portland cement, salt, soap, milk, flour, molasses, alum, and soil.

Whitewash is sometimes coloured with earths to achieve colours spanning the range of broken white, cream, yellow and a range of browns.

The blue laundry dye (such as Reckitt's "Dolly Blue" in the UK, Ireland and Australia, Loulaki in Greece, or Mrs. Stewart's Bluing in North America), formerly widely used to give a bright tinge to boiled white textiles, was a common 19th century addition.

Apocryphally, pig's blood was added to give the colour Suffolk pink, a colour widely used on house exteriors in some areas of the UK.

Pozzolanic materials are occasionally added to give a much harder wearing paint finish. This addition creates a short open time and therefore requires timely application of the altered paint.

Linseed oil is sometimes added (typically 0.5-2%) to improve adhesion on difficult surfaces.

Cement addition makes a harder wearing paint in white or grey. Open time is short, so this is added at point of use. Cement restricts the breathable aspects of the limewash and is inadvisable for preserved historic buildings.

Dilute glues improve paint toughness.

Wheat flour has been used as a strength enhancing binder. Salt is often added to prevent mold.

=== Limitations ===
Basic limewash can be inadequate in its ability to prevent rain-driven water ingress. Additives are being developed but these have the potential for affecting free vapor permeability. For this reason silicate paints, more common in Germany, are gaining popularity in the UK over limewash.

== Applications ==
=== Orchards ===
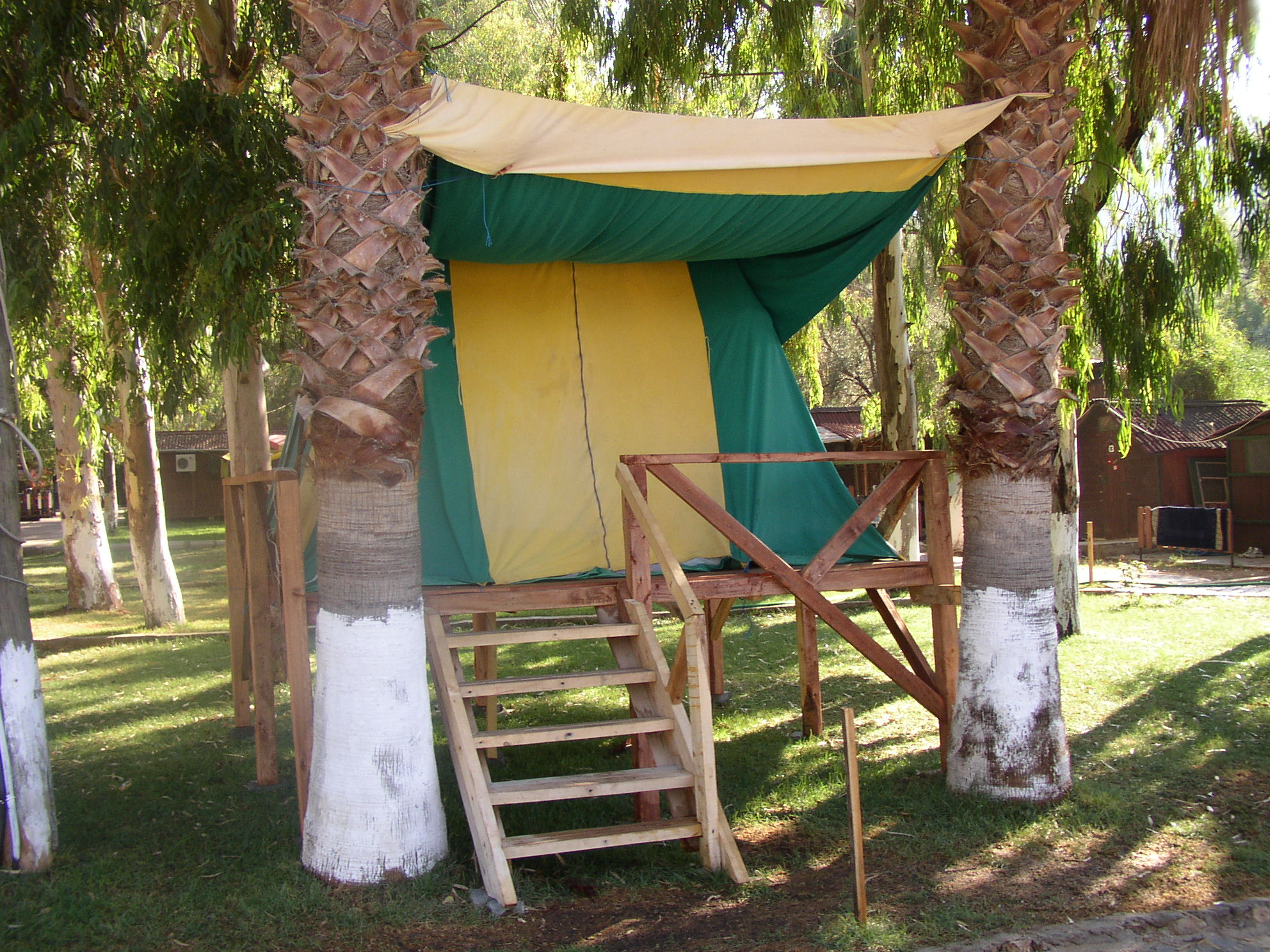
White-painted trees in Turkey

Whitewash is applied to trees, especially fruit trees, to prevent sun scald. Most often only the lower trunk is painted. In Poland painting the whole trunk is also said to help keep the body of the tree cool in late winter and early spring months and hence help prevent fruit trees from blooming too soon, i.e., when warm sunny days could promote rapid tree warming, rising sap and bloom and intermittent frosty nights could damage outer tree rings and destroy the young buds and blossoms.

=== Dairy barns ===
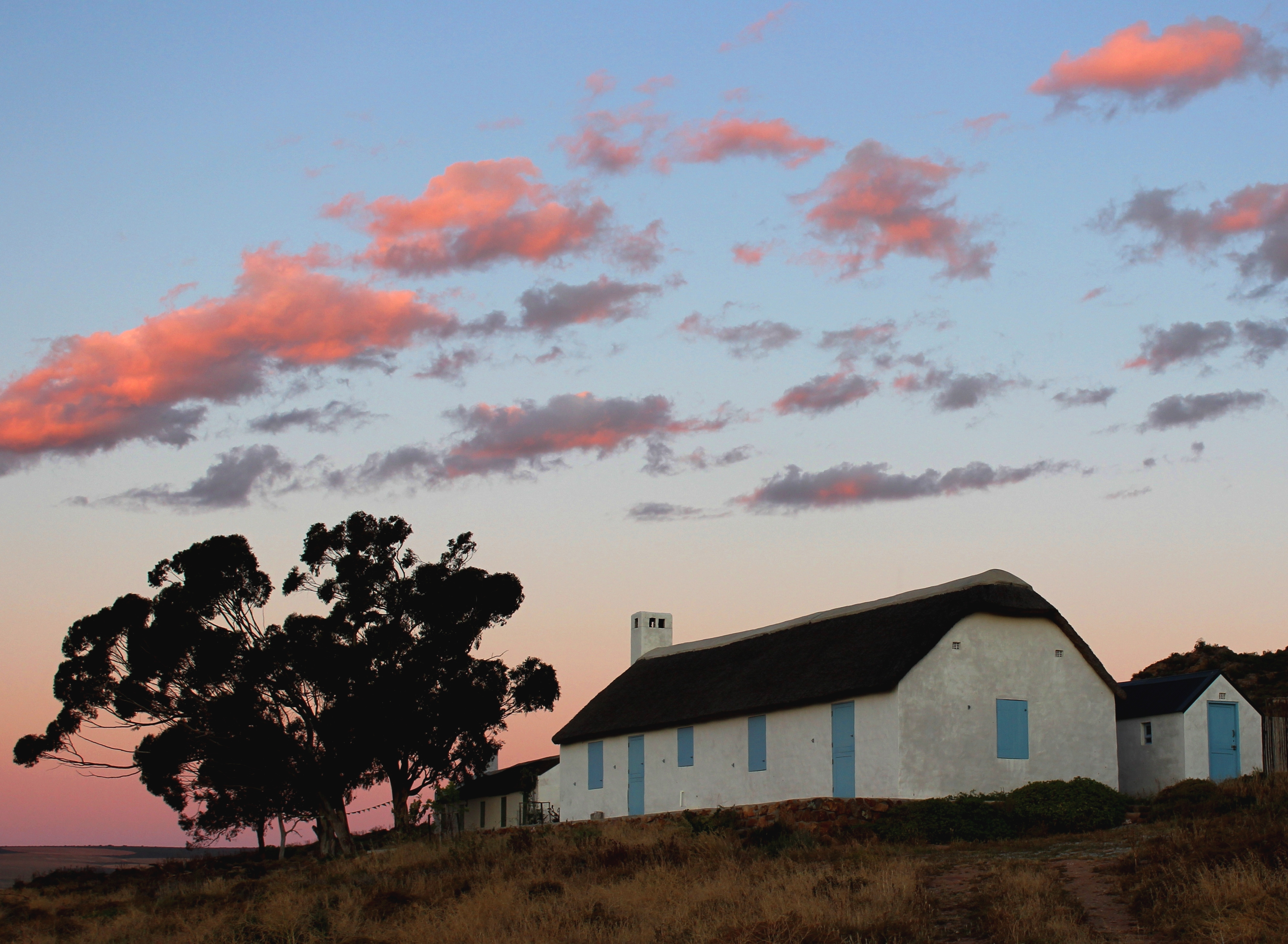
A whitewashed langhuis (long cottage) in rural Verloren Vlei, Western Cape region of South Africa

In the middle of the 20th century, when family farms with dairy barns were common in the Upper Midwest of the United States, whitewash was a necessary part of routine barn maintenance.

A traditional animal barn contains a variety of extremely rough surfaces that are difficult to wash and keep clean, such as stone and brick masonry, and also rough-cut lumber for the ceiling. If left alone, these surfaces collect dust, dirt, insect debris and wastes, and can become very dirty.

Whitewash aids in sanitation by coating and smoothing over the rough surfaces. Successive applications of whitewash build up layers of scale that flake off and, in the process, remove surface debris. The coating also has antimicrobial properties that provide hygienic and sanitary benefits for animal barns.

=== Glasshouses ===
Glasshouse roofs were traditionally whitewashed at the onset of summer to reduce the daytime internal temperature and to avoid burning sensitive plants. The glass would be scraped clean in autumn.

=== Other uses ===
Whitewash was painted on the internal walls of Royal Navy vessels during the Age of Sail to improve light levels inside a vessel's gundeck, reduce bacteria and prevent wear and tear on hull timbers. It was also used during the Second World War by the German armed forces as an easy-to-apply winter camouflage for soft- and hard-skinned vehicles, aircraft and helmets.

== In popular culture ==
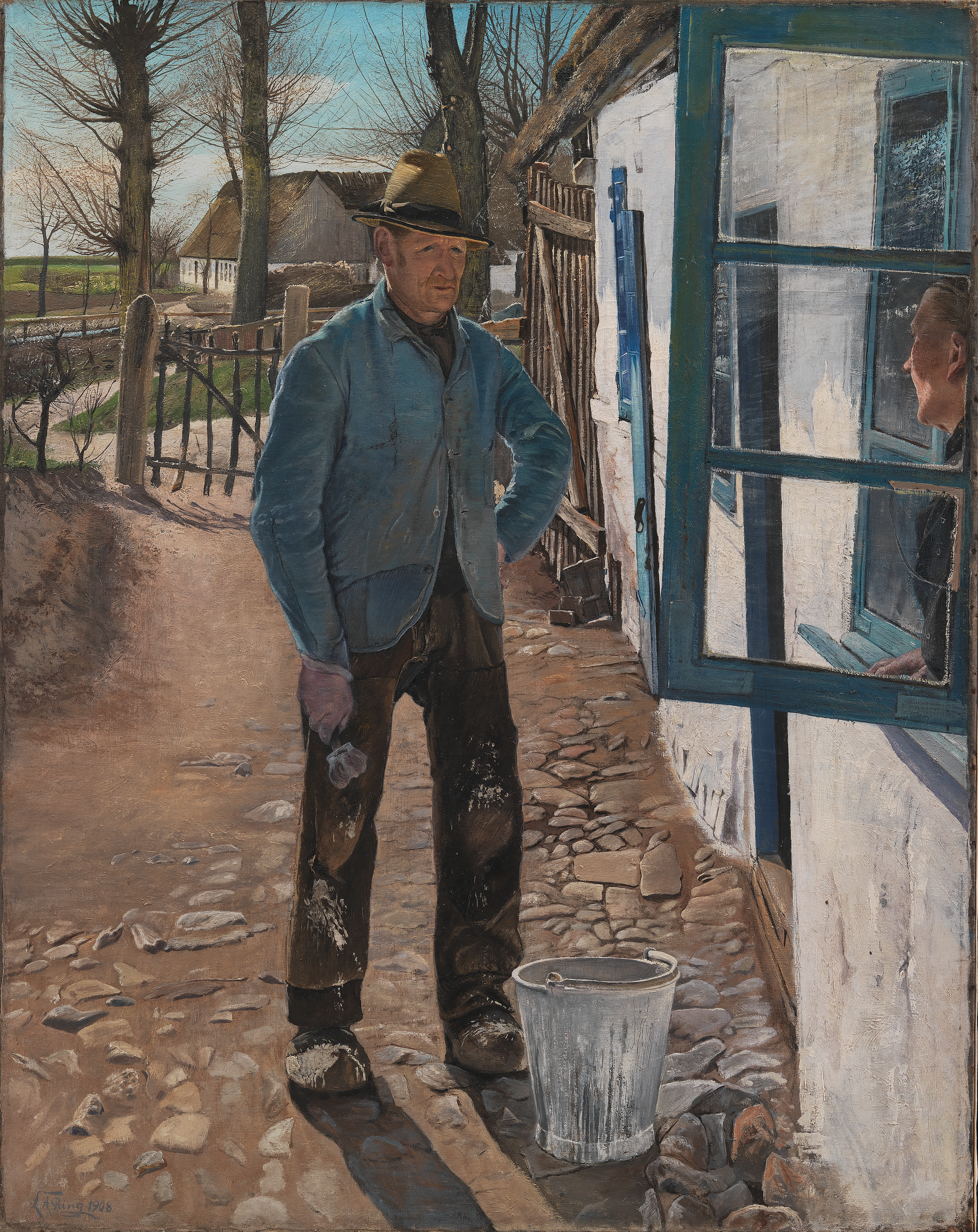
Whitewashing the Old House, painting by L.A. Ring, from the National Gallery of Denmark

The incident of Tom Sawyer whitewashing a fence as punishment is a famous image in American literature. It appears in The Adventures of Tom Sawyer written in 1876 by Mark Twain.

In the 1934 film, Fugitive Lovers, Madge Evans drops a bottle of cosmetics that she calls her "Calcimine".

Metaphorically, whitewashing refers to suppression or "glossing over" (possibly a close parallel construction) of potentially damaging or unwelcome information. In many Commonwealth areas, a whitewash refers to a game in which one side fails to score at all; the usage is especially found in cricket.

== See also ==
- Lime plaster
- Lime mortar
- Silicate paint
