= Bluing =

Bluing (steel) is a passivation process in which steel is partially protected against rust

Bluing may also refer to:

- Bluing (fabric), a blue dye used to improve the appearance of fabrics
- Bluing (hair), a blue dye used to improve the appearance of hair
- "bluing" of machine parts to check for tolerances, see engineer's blue

== See also ==
- Bluey (disambiguation)
- Blued (disambiguation)
- Blue (disambiguation)
