= Blues (disambiguation) =

The blues is a vocal and instrumental form of music based on the use of the blue notes and a repetitive pattern.

Blues or The Blues may also refer to:

== Art, entertainment, and media ==
- Twelve-bar blues
- Talking blues
- Blues dance, a style of social dance done to blues music
- The Blues (film series), a documentary series produced by Martin Scorsese
- Blues (print), a 2007 print by Loretta Pettway Bennett

=== Fictional entities ===
- Blues, the final boss in the video game Yie Ar Kung-Fu
- Proto Man, a video game character from the Mega Man series, called Blues in Japan
- The Blues trio (Jim, Jay and Jake) from the Angry Birds game series

=== Music ===
- "The Blues" (Tony! Toni! Toné! song), 1990 song by Tony! Toni! Toné!
- "The Blues" (Randy Newman song), 1983 song by Randy Newman with Paul Simon
- Blues, a common "placeholder" genre for ID3 tags on MP3 files, and other formats
- "New Blues", a song by Joe Satriani from his album The Extremist
- The Blues Overdrive, a Danish blues rock band

==== Albums ====
- Blues (Jimi Hendrix album), compilation album by guitarist Jimi Hendrix
- Blues (Bob Dylan album), a Bob Dylan compilation album
- Blues (Breakout album), studio album by Polish band Breakout
- Blues (Eric Clapton album), a 1999 blues rock album by Eric Clapton
- Blues (L.A. Blues Authority Volume II), a 1993 album by Glenn Hughes
- Blue's, a 1987 album by Zucchero Fornaciari
- Blue;s, a 2018 EP by Mamamoo
- The Blues (B. B. King album), a 1958 blues album by B. B. King
- The Blues, a 1960 blues album by John Lee Hooker
- The Blues (Alex Harvey album), a 1964 album by Alex Harvey
- The Blues (Johnny Hodges album) a 1955 jazz album by Johnny Hodges
- The Blues: Baby Please Don't Go 1935–1951, an album by Big Joe Williams, released in 2003
- The Blues (EP), a 2003 EP by Some Girls

== Law enforcement and military ==
- Dress blues (disambiguation), the dress uniforms of some law enforcement and military branches
- Jersey Blues, the nickname of the 1st New Jersey Regiment
- Jersey Blues, the nickname of the 50th Armored Division
- Royal Horse Guards, Household Cavalry regiment of the British Army, known as The Blues

== Organizations ==
- Blues (Vénetoi), a political faction and associated chariot racing team in the Byzantine empire
- Bleus de Bretagne (Association of Breton Blues), a liberal and anticlerical organization in late 19th century Brittany
- Blue Cross Blue Shield Association, a federation of health insurance companies primarily in the United States

== Sports ==
- Blue (university sport), an award won by athletes

=== "The Blues" ===
The Blues is a nickname of a number of sporting teams:

- Armagh Blues F.C., Northern Ireland association football team
- Sturt Double Blues, Australian rules football team in the SANFL
- Carlton Football Club (nickname: the Blues), Australian rules football team in the AFL
- Cleveland Blues (disambiguation), various baseball teams of that name
- Nashville Blues, a minor league baseball team based in Nashville, Tennessee in 1887
- New South Wales cricket team, also known as the Blues
- Espoo Blues, ice hockey team of Espoo, Finland
- St. Louis Blues, professional NHL ice hockey team based in St. Louis, Missouri
- Blues (Super Rugby), rugby union team based in Auckland
- Cardiff Blues, rugby union team from Wales
- New South Wales rugby league team, also known as the Blues
- Buffalo Blues, a defunct Federal League baseball team
- Toronto Varsity Blues, the collegiate sports teams of the University of Toronto
- The Blues is a nickname of a number of association football clubs:
  - Italy national football team is nicknamed "Gli Azzurri", which translates to "The Blues" in Italian
  - Waterford United F.C.
  - The Blues is a common nickname of a number of British association football clubs:
    - Birmingham City F.C.
    - Bury Town F.C.
    - Chelsea F.C.
    - Everton F.C.
    - Ipswich Town F.C.
    - Linfield F.C.
    - Manchester City F.C.
    - Southend United F.C.

== Other uses ==
- BLUES, a German air pollution monitoring system
- Blues Saraceno (born 1971), guitarist and music producer
- Depression (mood), often referred to as "the blues"
- Butterflies referred to as "blues":
  - Polyommatinae
  - Glaucopsyche
  - Plebejus
- Three narcotic medications sometimes referred to as "blues" due to their color:
  - Alprazolam (Xanax)
  - Diazepam (Valium)
  - Oxycodone (Oxycontin/Roxicodone)

== See also ==
- Blue (disambiguation)
- Les Bleus (disambiguation)
- Hill Street Blues
