= Blue (disambiguation) =

Blue is a color.

Blue may also refer to:

== Places ==
- Blue, Arizona, an unincorporated community in the US
- Blue, Oklahoma, an unincorporated community in the US
- Blue, West Virginia, an unincorporated community in the US
- Blue County, Choctaw Nation, dissolved in 1907 when Oklahoma achieved statehood
- Blue, Ontario, a former township amalgamated in Dawson, Ontario, Canada
- Blue Desert, part of the Sinai Desert
- Blue Mountain (disambiguation)
- Blue Mountains (disambiguation)
- Blue River (disambiguation)

== People ==
- Blue (name), a list of people with the given name, nickname or surname

== Animals and mascots ==
- Blue (Don Cherry's dog), a dog owned by ice hockey commentator Don Cherry
- Blue, a Siamese cat taken hostage in the Gresham cat hostage taking incident
- Blue (NFL mascot), the official mascot of the Indianapolis Colts professional American football franchise
- Blue, a mascot of the University of Kentucky Wildcats
- Blue, the mascot of Team Liquid
- Butler Blue, a succession of live mascots of Butler University
- Polyommatinae, a subfamily of butterflies

== Companies and products ==
- Blue Inc, a London-based chain of fashion retail stores
- Blue Microphones, a microphone manufacturer
- Blue Network, an American radio network from 1927 to 1945, the predecessor of ABC
- Labatt Blue, a Canadian brand of beer
- B'lue, an Asian sports drink also known as Mizone

== Computing and mathematics ==
- Blue (queue management algorithm)
- Best Linear Unbiased Estimator, a concept in statistics
- Windows Blue, codename for Microsoft Windows 8.1

== Art, entertainment, and media ==
=== Fictional entities ===
- Blue (Blue Gender)
- Blue (Pokémon Adventures), the protagonist's rival in the manga adaptation of Pokémon in Pokémon Adventures
- Blue (SaGa Frontier character)
- Blue (Wolf's Rain)
- Blue Chessex, a character in Degrassi: The Next Generation
- Green (Pokémon Adventures), who was called Blue in the original Japanese version, in Pokémon Adventures
- Blue, a fictional character in the Web series Dick Figures, made by Mondo Media
- Blue (Pokémon), the rival character in the video games Pokémon Red and Blue, and the main inspiration for the anime character Gary Oak
- Blue, the title character of Blue's Clues, Blue's Room and Blue's Clues & You!
- Blue, a cat in U.S. Acres by Jim Davis
- Blue, a character in Snow by Orhan Pamuk
- Joseph "Blue" Pulaski, a character in the film Old School
- Blu, a Spix's macaw who is the protagonist of Rio and Rio 2
- Blue Sargent, a fictional character from The Raven Cycle novels by Maggie Steifvater
- Blue (comics), a race of aquatic humanoids from Image Comics and Aspen Comics
- Blue, a Velociraptor in Jurassic World and Jurassic World: Fallen Kingdom
- Blue, a SilkWing in the novel series Wings of Fire
- Blue, a character in the Roblox video game Rainbow Friends

=== Films ===
- Blue (1968 film), starring Terence Stamp
- Blue (1992 film), by Don McKellar
- Blue (1993 film), by Derek Jarman
- Three Colors: Blue, a French drama by Krzysztof Kieślowski, part of the Three Colors trilogy
- Blue (2001 film), a Japanese romantic drama
- Blue (2003 film), a South Korean war film
- Blue (2009 film), a Bollywood action film

=== Music, theatre, and television ===
==== Bands ====
- Blue (English group), an English boy band
- Blue (Scottish band), a Scottish pop rock band
- Bruford Levin Upper Extremities or B.L.U.E., a 1990s British rock group

==== Albums ====
- Blue (Angela Aki album), 2012
- Blue (Closterkeller album), 1992
- Blue (Diana Ross album), 2006
- Blue (Double album), 1985
- Blue (Down by Law album), 1992
- Blue (Flashlight Brown album), 2006
- Blue (Gary Chaw album), 2006
- Blue (iamamiwhoami album), 2014
- Blue (The Jesus Lizard album), 1998
- Blue (Jonas Blue album), 2018
- Blue (Joni Mitchell album), 1971
- Blue (La! Neu? album), 1999
- Blue (LeAnn Rimes album), 1996
- Blue (The Mission album), 1996
- Blue (Phil Keaggy album), 1994
- Blue (Simply Red album), 1998
- Blue (Terje Rypdal album), 1987
- Blue (Third Eye Blind album), 1999

==== Songs ====
- "Blue" (A Perfect Circle song), 2004
- "Blue" (A. S. Blue song), 2011
- "Blue" (Big Bang song), 2012
- "Blue" (Bill Mack song), 1958, popularized by LeAnn Rimes (1996)
- "Blue" (Billie Eilish song), 2024
- "Blue" (Joel Deleōn song), 2023
- "Blue" (Joni Mitchell song), 1971
- "Blue" (Tiësto song), 2019
- "Blue" (The Rasmus song), 1997
- "Blue" (The Verve song), 1993
- "Blue" (Vivid song), 2011
- "Blue" (Yoasobi song), 2021
- "Blue" (Yung Kai song), 2024
- "Blue" (Zerobaseone song), 2025
- "Blue (Da Ba Dee)", a 1999 song by Eiffel 65
- "I'm Good (Blue)", a 2022 song by Bebe Rexha and David Guetta
- "Blue", by Angie Hart from the Buffy the Vampire Slayer episode "Conversations with Dead People"
- "Blue", by Beyoncé Knowles from Beyoncé
- "Blue", by the Birthday Massacre from Violet
- "Blue", by Calvin Harris from Ready for the Weekend
- "Blue", by DreamNote
- "Blue", by Elastica from Elastica
- "Blue", by Eve's Plum from Envy
- "Blue", by Fine Young Cannibals from Fine Young Cannibals
- "Blue", by First Aid Kit from The Lion's Roar
- "Blue", by Freddie Hart from Country Love Ballads
- "Blue", by Helen Reddy from We'll Sing in the Sunshine
- "Blue", by Hikaru Utada from Ultra Blue
- "Blue", by Jackson Wang from Magic Man
- "Blue", by the Jayhawks from Tomorrow the Green Grass
- "Blue", by Kai from Peaches
- "Blue", by Kali Uchis from Red Moon in Venus
- "Blue", by Kevin Ayers from Yes We Have No Mañanas (So Get Your Mañanas Today)
- "Blue", by LaTour from LaTour
- "Blue", by Linkin Park from LP Underground 11.0
- "Blue", by Lolo Zouaï from High Highs to Low Lows
- "Blue", by Lucinda Williams from Essence
- "Blue", by Madison Beer from Life Support
- "Blue", by Marina and the Diamonds from Froot
- "Blue", by Mika from My Name Is Michael Holbrook (2019)
- "Blue", by Orthodox Celts from The Celts Strike Again
- "Blue", by Peter, Paul and Mary from In Concert
- "Blue", by PinkPantheress from Heaven Knows
- "Blue", by the Seatbelts from Cowboy Bebop Blue
- "Blue", by Serj Tankian from Elect the Dead
- "Blue", by Sigrid from How to Let Go
- "Blue", by the Smashing Pumpkins from Lull
- "Blue", by Sugababes from Angels with Dirty Faces
- "Blue", by Taemin from Guilty
- "Blue", by Taeyeon from Purpose
- "Blue", by Troye Sivan from Blue Neighbourhood
- "Blue", by V from Layover
- "Blue", by Way Out West from Way Out West
- "Blue", by Wham! from Music from the Edge of Heaven
- "Blue", by Wonho
- "Blue", by Yngwie Malmsteen from Alchemy
- "Blue", by Zach Bryan from American Heartbreak (2022)
- "Blue", by Zayn Malik from Mind of Mine
- "Blue (And Broken Hearted)", written by Lou Handman
- "Blue", from Heathers: The Musical

==== Video and television ====
- Blue (video), a DVD by the Birthday Massacre
- Blue, a defunct Greek-language music video channel operated by ANT1 Group
- Blue (web series), an original production starring Julia Stiles on the WIGS YouTube channel
- "Blue" (Doctors), a 2004 episode
- "Blue" (Red Dwarf), a 1997 episode
- "Blue", a Series B episode of QI (2004)

==== Theatre performance ====
- Blue (opera), by Jeanine Tesori and Tazewell Thompson, 2019
- Working blue, or "blue material," the use of impolite language in comedy or other entertainment
  - Blue envelope (vaudeville), a performance art organization announcement prohibiting material as obscene
- Blue (play), 2019, written by Australian actor and playwright Thomas Weatherall

==== Other uses in music ====
- Blue (piano concerto), a composition by Matthew King
- Blue, a guitar owned by Billie Joe Armstrong

=== Periodicals ===
- Blue (Australian magazine), a gay men's magazine
- Blue (Italian magazine), an erotic comic magazine
- Blue (tourism magazine), a 1997-2003 American adventure travel magazine

=== Other arts and media ===
- Pokémon Red, Blue, and Yellow, the first games in the Pokémon franchise
- Blue, a 1991 novel by James Heneghan
- Blue (manga), a 1997 yuri manga by Kiriko Nananan
- Blue (sculpture), 2019, by Joel Shapiro

== Sports ==
- Blue (university sport), an award
- Blue, a slang term used to address a baseball umpire
- Blues (Byzantine Empire), a Byzantine chariot racing faction

== Other uses ==
- Blue, a doneness level of cooked meat
- Blue light spectrum, the blue region in the visible spectrum of light
- Blue envelope (law enforcement), a law enforcement initiative for autistic driver document storage and communication guidelines
- Blue roof, a roof of a building that is designed explicitly to provide initial temporary water storage and then gradual release of stored water, typically rainfall
- Blue School, a progressive independent school in New York City
- Blue state, county, etc., a U.S. area with a tendency to elect Democrats
- Case Blue, the German World War II plan for its 1942 summer offensive against the Soviet Union
- USS Blue (DD-387), a Bagley-class destroyer in service from 1937 to 1942
- USS Blue (DD-744), an Allen M. Sumner-class destroyer in service from 1944 to 1971
- Blue Line (disambiguation)

== See also ==
- Bloo (disambiguation)
- Blu (disambiguation)
- The Blue (disambiguation)
- Blued (disambiguation)
- Blues (disambiguation)
- Bluey (disambiguation)
- Bluing (disambiguation)
