= Blue (name) =

Blue is a given name, nickname, and surname. It may refer to:

== People ==
=== Surname ===
- Alfred Blue (born 1991), American football player
- Barry Blue (born 1950), British singer, popular in the 1970s
- Ben Blue (1901–1975), Canadian actor and comedian
- Billy Blue (c. 1767 – 1834), Australian convict
- Bob Blue (1948–2006), American singer-songwriter
- Callum Blue (born 1977), English actor
- Chris Blue (born 1990), American R&B singer
- Dan Blue (born 1949), American politician
- David Blue (actor) (born 1982), American actor, writer, producer and director
- David Blue (musician) (1941–1982), American singer-songwriter
- Forrest Blue (1945–2011), American football player
- Greg Blue (born 1982), American football player
- Jaydon Blue (born 2004), American football player
- John Blue (disambiguation), multiple people
- Jonas Blue (born 1989), British DJ, songwriter, and record producer
- Josh Blue (born 1978), American comedian
- Linden Blue (born 1936), American businessman
- Lionel Blue (1930–2016), British rabbi and broadcaster
- Lu Blue (1897–1958), American baseball player
- Mick Blue (born 1976), Austrian pornographic actor
- Mikal Blue (born 1966), British record producer and songwriter
- Neal Blue (born 1935), American businessman
- Rick Blue (born 1946), Canadian comedian and musician
- Richard W. Blue (1841–1907), American politician
- Robert Blue (1946–1989), American pin-up artist
- Robert D. Blue (1898–1989), American politician
- Rupert Blue (1868–1948) American physician and Surgeon General
- Skye Blue (born 1999), American professional wrestler
- Vander Blue (born 1992), American basketball player
- Vida Blue (1949–2023), American baseball player
- Violet Blue, American writer and sex columnist
- William Thornton Blue (1902–1968), American jazz clarinetist

=== Given name ===
- Blue Balliett (born 1955), American author
- Blue Barron (1913–2005), American orchestra leader born Harry Freidman
- Blue Cain (born 2004), American basketball player
- Blue Ivy Carter (born 2012), child of American musical artists Beyoncé and Jay Z
- Blue Curry (born 1974), Bahamian artist
- Blue Deckert, American actor
- Blue Duck (outlaw) (1859–1895), American outlaw
- Blue Kim, American actress
- Blue Kimble (born 1983), American actor, model, and football player
- Blue Leach (born 1967), music video TV director
- Blue LoLãn, American film director

=== Nickname or stage name ===
- Blue Adams (born 1979), American football player
- Blue Dixon (c. 1885 – c. 1941), Australian rugby union player
- Blue Edwards (born 1965), American basketball player
- Melvin Franklin (1942–1995), American singer
- Sandra Good (born 1944), associate of American criminal Charles Manson
- Blue Howell (fl. 1930s), American football player and coach
- Blue May, American music producer and collaborator with Lilly Allen
- Blue Mitchell (1930–1979), American trumpeter
- Blue Weaver (born 1947), Welsh keyboardist, session musician, songwriter and record producer
- Bonnie Blue (born 1999), pornographic film actress
- Lola Blue (born 2005), English actress

== Fictional characters ==
- Joseph "Blue" Pulaski, a character in the 2003 American movie Old School
- Blue Coulson, a character in the Black Mirror episode "Hated in the Nation"
- Blue Sargent, the protagonist of the young adult series The Raven Cycle
- Blue, cartoon character from Blue's Clues
- Benjamin Bufford "Bubba" Blue, a character in the 1994 Robert Zemeckis film Forrest Gump
- Blue, a minor character in the 2002 comedy film Kangaroo Jack
- Blue Jones, the primary antagonist in the 2011 film Sucker Punch
- Blue, the computer used to order the recall on Brand X in the 2012 film Foodfight!
- Blue Bennings, A character in the television series 9-1-1: Nashville
- Blue, a character in the video game Deltarune

== See also ==
- Blue (disambiguation)
