= Schrier =

Schrier is the surname of the following people:

- Amy Schrier, founder, publisher and editor-in-chief of the American adventure travel magazine Blue
- Fetter Schrier Hoblitzell (1838–1900), American politician and congressman
- Fred Schrier (born 1945), American artist, writer, and animator
- Harold G. Schrier (1916–1971), United States Marine Corps lieutenant colonel
- Jeffrey Schrier (born 1943), American visual artist
- Jos Schrier (born 1960), Dutch Olympic sailor
- Kim Schrier (born 1968), American politician and medical doctor
- Matt Schrier, American photographer
- Paul Schrier (born 1970), American actor
- Robert William Schrier (born 1936), American nephrologist and the founding editor-in-chief of the magazine Nature Clinical Practice Nephrology

== See also ==
- Scherer
