= The Blue Album =

The Blue Album or Blue album may refer to:

- Weezer (Blue Album), 1994 album by Weezer
- Collective Soul (1995 album) (also known as "The Blue Album"), a 1995 alternative rock album
- The Blue Album, 2002 rock album by Valensia
- Blue Album (Orbital album), 2004 electronica album
- Blue (Diana Ross album), 2006 a soul/jazz album
- Blue (Joni Mitchell album), 1971 album by singer-songwriter Joni Mitchell
- Blue (Third Eye Blind album), 1999 rock album
- The Blue (album), 2007 metal album by Novembre
- Lukas Graham (Blue Album), 2015 album by the band Lukas Graham
- Sinii Albom (English: The Blue Album), 1981 rock album by Aquarium
- The Blue Album, 2000 demo album by the All-American Rejects
- The Blue Album, 2007 parody album by Black Lace
- The Blue Album, 2010 album by Mr. Capone-E
- Adolescents (album), 1981 punk album by the Adolescents
- 1967–1970, a 1973 compilation of songs by the Beatles
- 311 (album), 1995 alternative rock album by 311
- One, a 2012 album by C418

== See also ==
- The Blue EP (disambiguation)
- The White Album (disambiguation)
- Blue (disambiguation)
