= The Blue (disambiguation) =

The Blue is a market place in Bermondsey, London.

The Blue may also refer to:

- The Blue (musical duo), a South Korean musical duo
- The Blue (album), an album by Novembre
- The Blue (April EP), a 2018 EP by April
- "The Blue", a song by Acid Bath from When the Kite String Pops
- "The Blue", a song by Gracie Abrams from Good Riddance
- "The Blue" (Against All Will song)
- "The Blue" (David Gilmour song)
- Albertsons Stadium, Boise, Idaho, U.S., nicknamed "The Blue" due to its blue artificial turf surface

== See also ==
- TheBlu, digital media franchise founded in 2011
- Blue (disambiguation)
- The Blue Album (disambiguation)
- The Blue EP (disambiguation)
