= Bluey =

Bluey may refer to:

== People ==
- Bluey (nickname), a list of people with the nickname
- Frank "Bluey" Adams (1935–2019), Australian rules football player
- Arthur George "Bluey" Wilkinson (1911–1940), Australian speedway rider
- Robert Bluey (born 1979), American conservative blogger and journalist
- Jean-Paul Maunick, British guitarist, bandleader, composer, and record producer (stage name "Bluey")

== Television ==
- Bluey (TV series), a 2018 Australian animated children's television series
  - Bluey Heeler, titular protagonist of the series
  - Bluey: The Album, a 2021 soundtrack album for the series
  - Bluey: The Videogame, a 2023 video game based on the series
  - Lego Bluey, a 2025 mobile game based on the series, portrayed as LEGO characters
  - Bluey's Quest for the Gold Pen, a 2025 video game based on the series
  - Bluey's Happy Snaps, a 2026 photography video game based on the series
- Bluey (1976 TV series), an Australian police drama television series

== Other uses ==
- Slang term for an Australian Cattle Dog
- Bluey (long-lived dog) (1910–1939), certified by Guinness World Records as the world's longest-living dog
- "Bluey the Walrus", a character in the 1997 video game Donkey Kong Racing and Diddy Kong Racing
- "Bluey", a character in the Bluey and Curley (1939–1975) comic strip drawn by Alex Gurney
- British Slang term for a pornographic film, derived from the Electric Blue (TV series)
- Australian swagman's bundle of possessions; "humping Bluey", to travel so laden

== See also ==
- Blueys Beach, a suburb of Pacific Palms, New South Wales, Australia
- Bluey Day Foundation, a defunct Australian charity
- Bluie, US military codename for Greenland
- Louie Bluie (1909–2003), U.S. musician
- Blued (disambiguation)
- Bluing (disambiguation)
- Blue (disambiguation)
