= Keith Ellis (rugby union) =

Australian rugby union international

- Full name: Keith James Ellis
- Born: 30 March 1927 Casino, NSW, Australia
- Died: 17 April 1989 (aged 62)

Rugby union career
- Position: Prop
International career
Years	Team	Apps	(Points)
1958–59	Australia	5	(0)

Keith James Ellis (30 March 1927 – 17 April 1989) was an Australian rugby union international.

Raised in the Northern Rivers region of New South Wales, Ellis was a prop and got his nickname "Bluey" on account of his red hair. After starting out in Sydney club rugby in the lower grades at Drummoyne, he moved in 1951 to Manly, where he featured in a then club record 185 first-grade games.

Ellis was capped five times for the Wallabies, playing all three Tests on the 1958 tour of New Zealand and both Tests against the visiting British Lions the following year.

== See also ==
- List of Australia national rugby union players
