= Blued =

Blued may refer to:

- Bluing (steel), a type of finish
- blued (macOS)
- Blued (app)

== See also ==
- Bluing (disambiguation)
- Blues (disambiguation)
- Bluey (disambiguation)
- Blue (disambiguation)
