= Mrs. Stewart's Bluing =

Laundry product used for whitening dingy fabrics

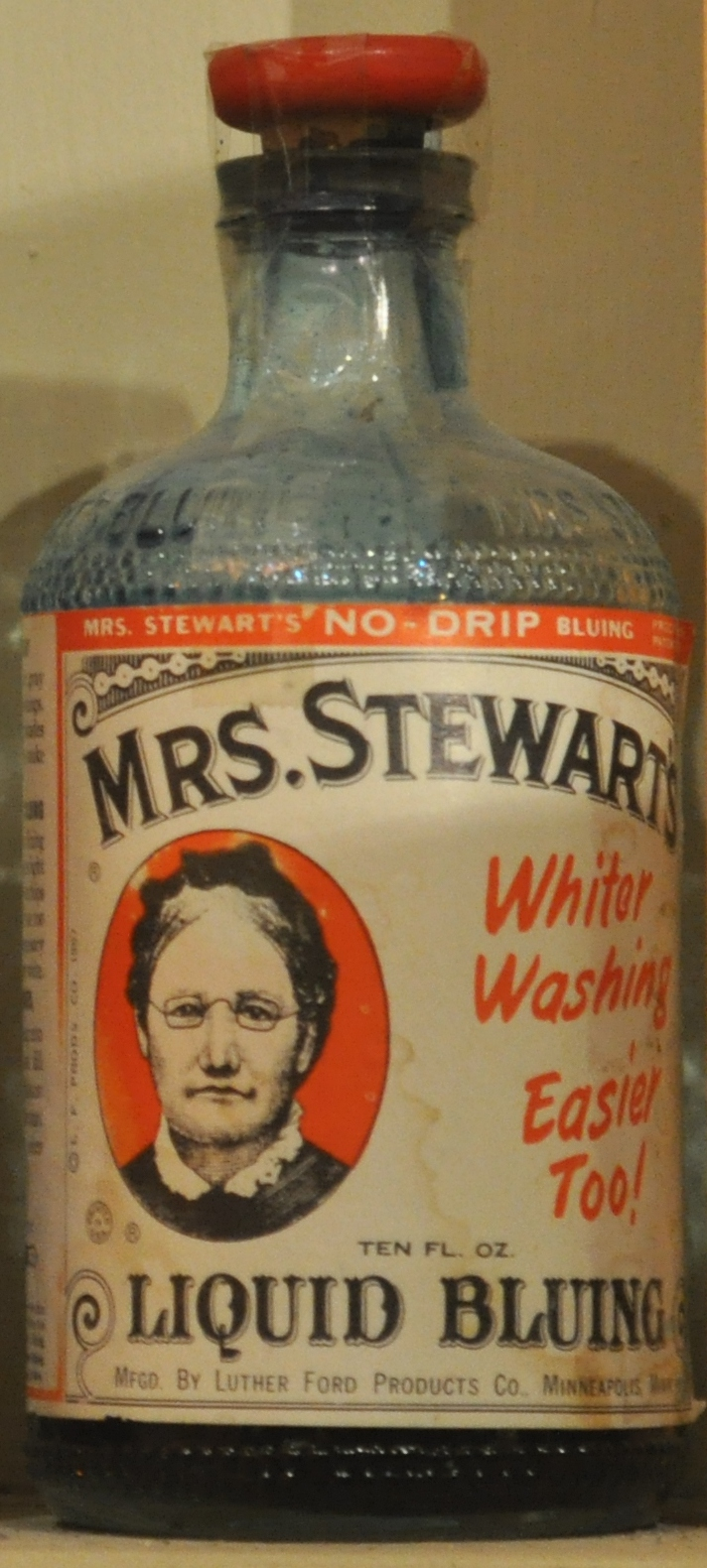
Mrs. Stewart's Bluing

Mrs. Stewart's Bluing is a brand of liquid bluing agent used for whitening fabrics. It is primarily a colloid of the blue pigment "Prussian blue" and water.

== History ==
Mrs. Stewart's was founded by Al Stewart, a traveling salesman who sold the formula to Luther Ford of Minneapolis, Minnesota, who owned what has been claimed as the second five and dime store west of Wanseburge, Pennsylvania. Mrs. Stewart's Bluing was first sold at Ford's store in 1883. The product has been manufactured exclusively in Minnesota.

The picture on the label is a portrait of Al Stewart's mother-in-law. Her name was "Mrs. Stewart." Mrs. Stewart's Bluing once attempted to change the photo on the label to appear "kinder looking," but customers demanded the stern faced matron be returned to the label.

The Stewarts sold the rights to manufacture their product to Luther Ford of Minneapolis, Minnesota, in 1883. The product has continued to be manufactured exclusively in Minnesota.

In 1976 the company moved from Minneapolis to Bloomington, a nearby suburb.

== Uses ==
The product is primarily used on white fabrics that have become dingy or have taken on a yellow color cast over time. When a small amount of it is added to wash water, fabric laundered in it will actually be dyed slightly blue. Because blue and yellow are complementary colors in the subtractive model of color perception, the added trace of blue color visually cancels out the yellow color cast, making the fabric again appear white (actually less brightly white than originally).

Like other bluing agents, the product can be used for other purposes as well. This includes dyeing hair and dyeing denim jeans. It is also sometimes used by white-haired people in a blue rinse.

== See also ==
- Dolly blue
- List of cleaning products
