= Blue hair =

Unnatural coloration

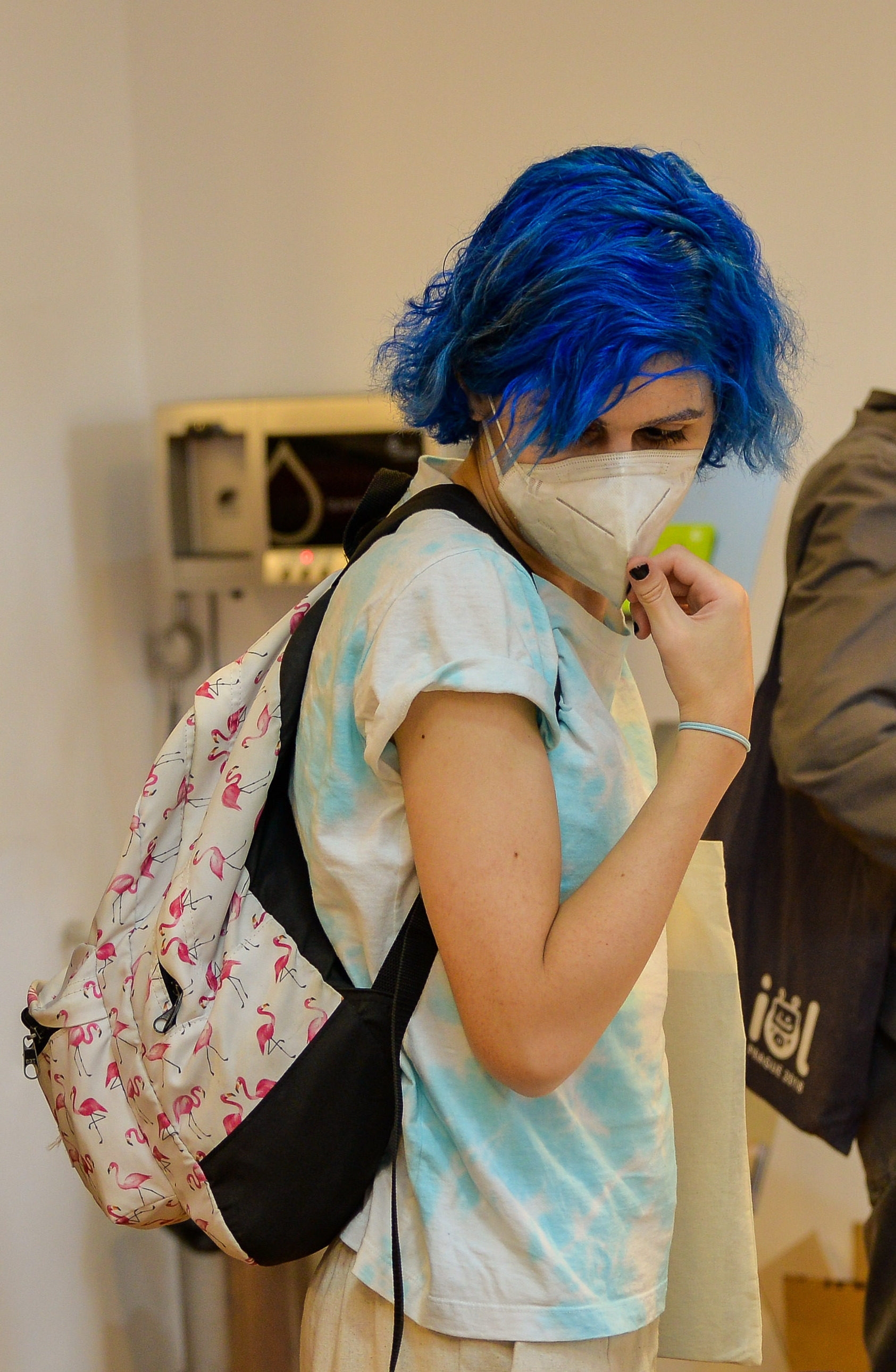
Person with hair dyed blue during WikiCon Brasil 2022

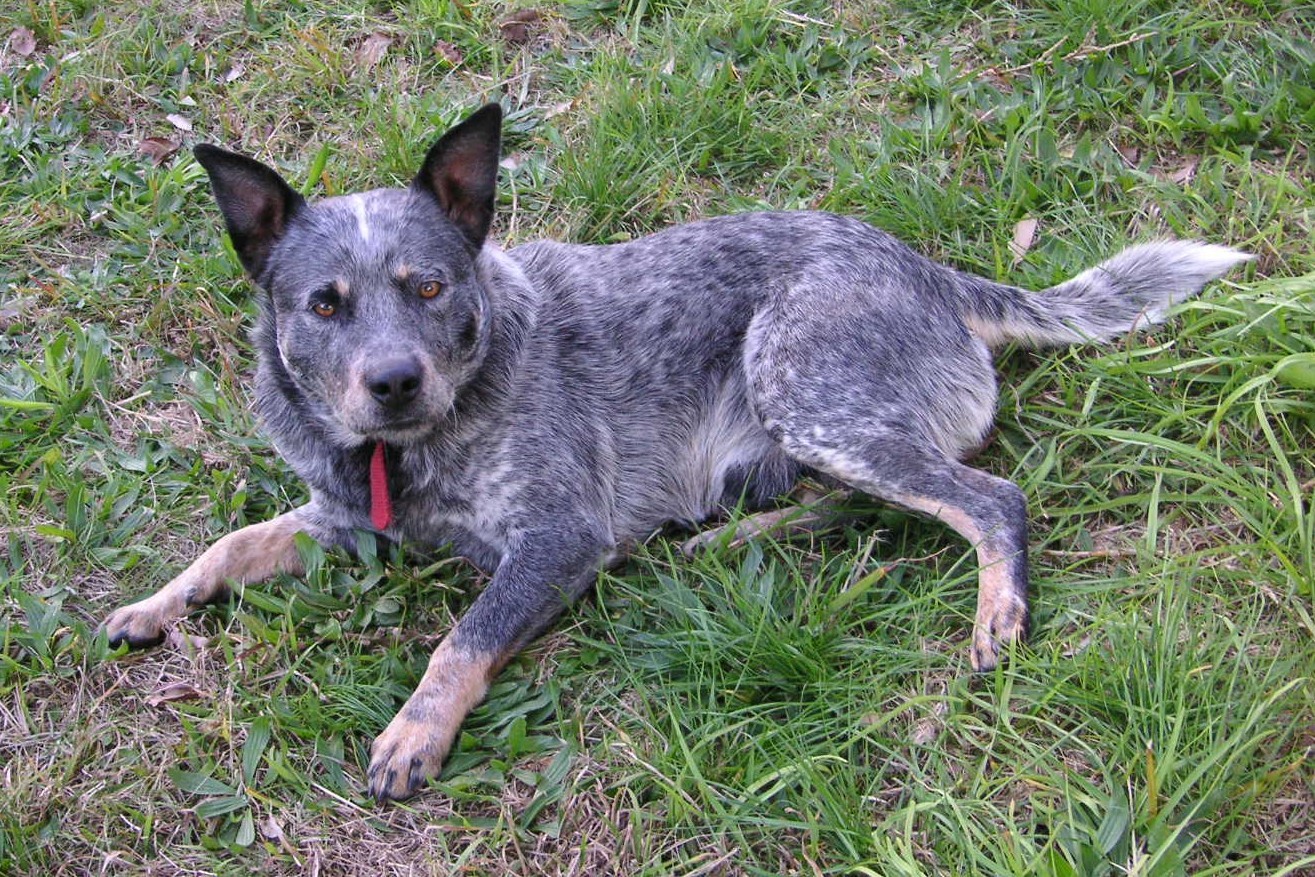
An Australian blue heeler dog

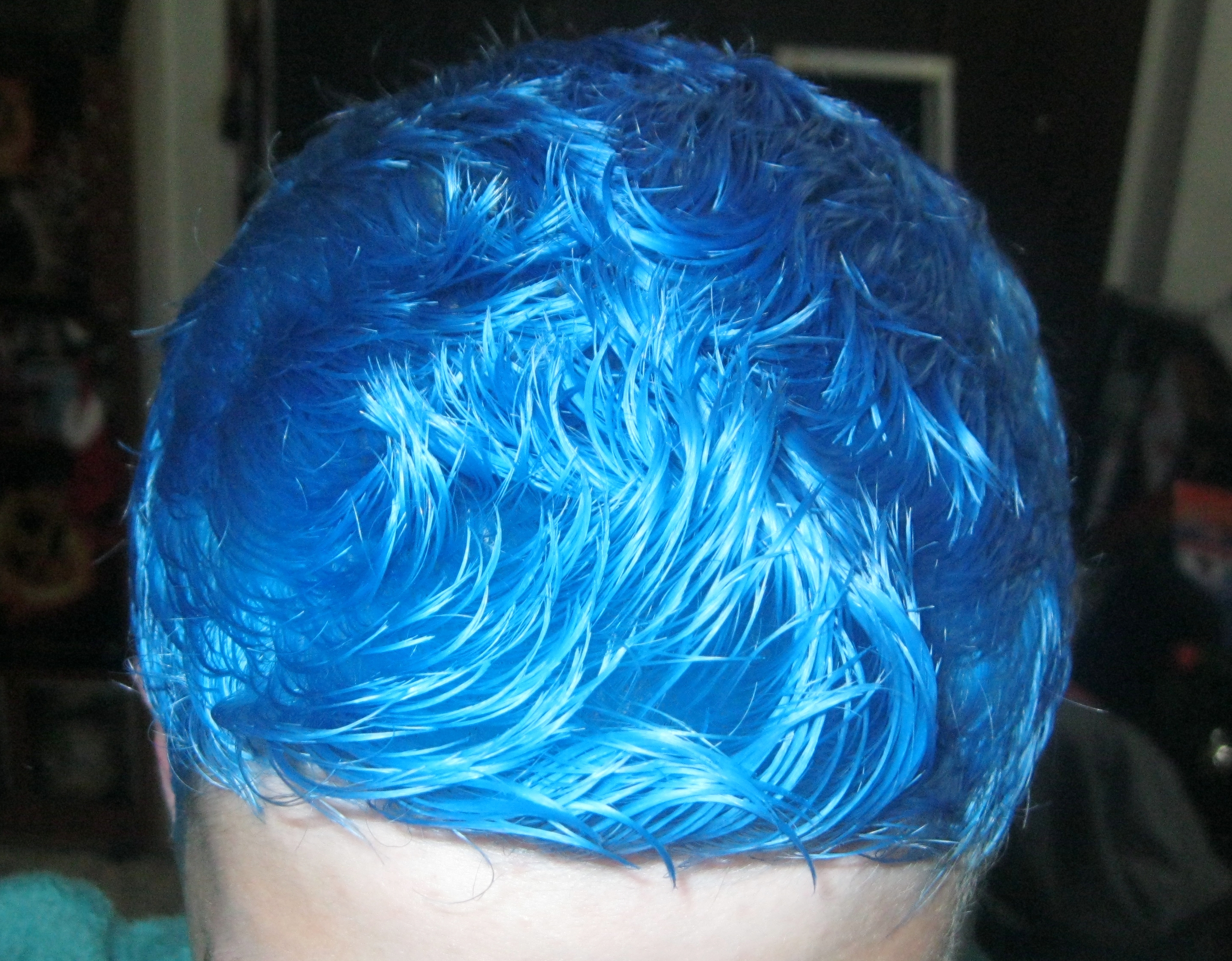
Dyed blue hair

Blue hair does not naturally occur in human hair pigmentation, although the hair of some animals (such as dog coats) is described as blue.

Some people (typically of East Asian descent) are born with black hair that is so dark that it appears to have a metallic blue luster. In Japan, the beauty ideal for a woman is to have glossy "blue-black" hair, and Western foreign observers have also held this quality in high regard.

== Fashion ==
The 18th-century English politician Charles Fox was a fashionable macaroni in his youth and tinted his hair with blue powder.

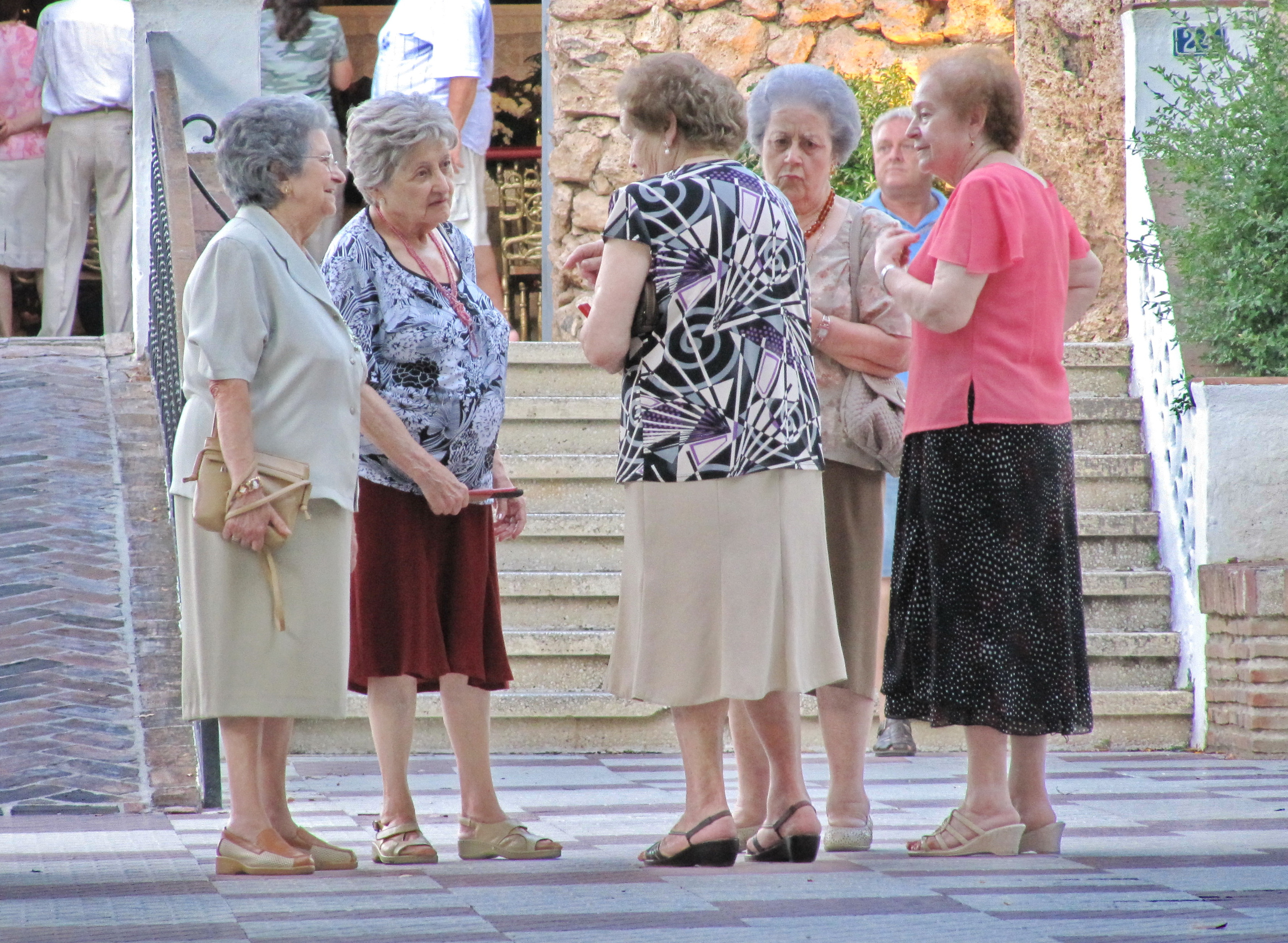
A group of Spanish women with blue-rinsed hair

In 1913–1914, just before World War I, there was a vogue for dyed brightly colored hair in different shades such as blue, violet or emerald. This started in Paris and then spread to other cities such as London. In 1924, the first celebrity hairstylist, Monsieur Antoine (Antoni Cierplikowski), dyed his dog's hair blue. An influential client, Lady Elsie De Wolfe Mendl, took up the same style and this started a new fad. Later in the 20th century, mature ladies had a blue rinse to conceal grey hair. The Queen Mother was the trend-setter and the peak of popularity for this fashion was the period following World War II.

In the 2007 fall fashion season, designers such as Marc Jacobs and Duckie Brown dyed the hair of their models blue to give them a shocking punk look. In 2011, the blue rinse became fashionable again and exemplars included Kate Bosworth with a dip-dyed style of turquoise tips while Thakoon Panichgul continued to present models with startling, all-blue hair.

A synthetic dye used to color hair blue was 1,4,5,8-tetraaminoanthraquinone prepared as Disperse Blue 1 with water and lignosulfonate dispersant. This is a semi-permanent dye as the dye molecules do not penetrate the hair shaft and so wash out in subsequent shampooing. It is not used in the U.S. as it is thought to be carcinogenic.

=== American politics ===
Beginning in the 2010s, and into the early 2020s, blue hair (and less commonly purple hair) has become associated with environmentalism, feminism, anarchism, communism, socialism, liberalism and the LGBTQ community, especially the young Generation Z and Millennial members of those socio-political movements. In response, supporters of conservatism in the United States and the Republican Party have started to use blue-haired or purple-haired as a slur towards liberals.

== Occupational causes ==
The hair of workers who regularly come into close contact with cobalt or indigo may become blue because of the dust of the substance mixing into the hair follicles. The colour in these cases is "not merely superficial."

== Other animals ==
Some varieties of rabbit have been bred with blue hair such as the Blue of Sint-Niklaas, a Belgian breed. This was a light sky blue in color with a white blaze. Other breeds of blue rabbit are darker and there are about 45 different shades or textures recognised by show judges.

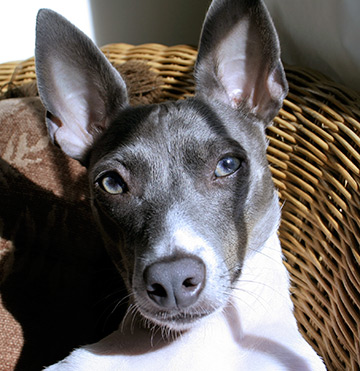
An example of a blue coated Rat Terrier. Note the pale or "diluted" pigment of the nose and eyes.

There are several breeds of dogs which may have a blue coat including the Kerry Blue Terrier, Bluetick Coonhound and Grand Bleu de Gascogne. This arises in two main ways: from a dilution or silvering of a black coat so that it is seen as blue-grey; or from a mottling or marbling effect which mixes black and white to be seen as navy blue.

The fleece of sheep may be a natural blue-grey, such as the Himalayan blue sheep, or may be dyed blue as a raddle or to make them more conspicuous in snowy conditions.

Oxen breeds referred to as Blue Roane were plentiful centuries ago (shades of blue) and some of that genetics somehow evolved into slight tinting of blue in some Holstein cattle.

The coat of several other animals is called blue, including those of blue roan horses, the Russian Blue cat, and the blue variant of the Arctic fox's coat.

== Artistic representations ==
=== Pictures ===
Blue hair has been described as a "sacred aesthetic" in ancient Egypt and Mesopotamia, where lapis lazuli was used in funerary art and statuary.

Many colored pictorials from the Anglo-Saxon tribes after the departure of Roman troops feature women with blue hair. According to Gale R. Owen-Crocker in Dress in Anglo-Saxon England "the use of colour in Anglo-Saxon art is not realistic ... and there is no need to assume dye was used on the hair."

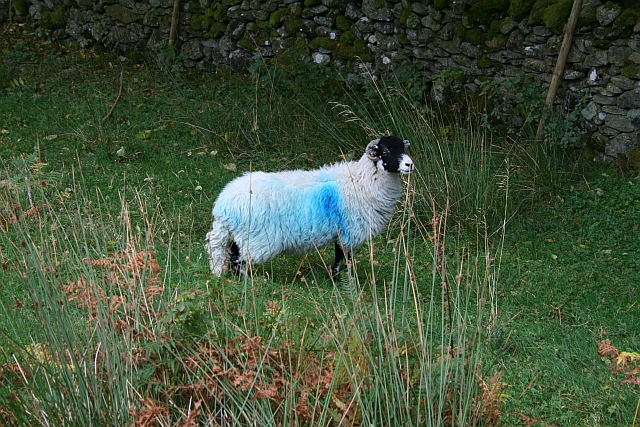
Sheep marked with blue dye

Representations of the Buddha often feature blue hair, sometimes of a brilliant hue. This artistic convention emphasizes the blue element in the 'blue-black' hair said to be one of the 32 special physical characteristics of the Buddha. Traces of ancient blue pigment could be seen in the hair grooves of some of the 4-6C Buddhas known as the 'Qingzhou Buddhas' found in an ancient schoolyard pit in China in Qingzhou (Shandong) in 1996, shown on exhibit in London and many other world capitals.

=== Literary works ===
In some works by Homer, characters are said to have dark blue (kyaneos) hair or eyebrows when they are angry or in an emotionally intense state. For example, Odysseus' beard became black blue when he was transformed by Athena upon returning home to confront his wife's suitors. Other Greek gods were also shown as having blue hair. This imagery may stem from Egyptian myth, in which their gods were said to have hair of lapis lazuli. In a similar vein, characters from the Bible, such as Eve, Leah, and Rachel, are often depicted with a "sky-blue" color of hair. Color in ancient countries (Greece and Egypt) were also more expressive rather than natural: blue or gold indicated divinity due to its unnatural appearance and association with precious materials.

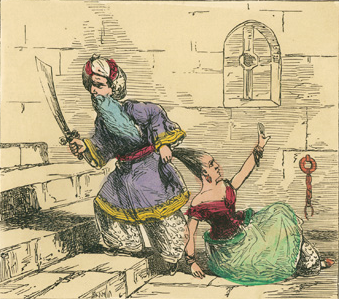
Bluebeard

The Fairy with Turquoise Hair is a major character in Pinocchio. She is often titled as the "Child with the Blue Hair" and even has a chapter in The Adventures of Pinocchio devoted to this title. Literary critics have offered varied interpretations of her hair color. It may invoke associations with "the ineffable or infinite", with the Italian sky, or with the Virgin Mary, who is often shown with a blue mantle.

The sci-fi/fantasy anthology, Once Upon a Future Time Volume 4, includes a short story, "The Blue Fairy," in which a woman with blue hair is accused of illegally creating androids.

The color blue owned aristocratic associations in Europe during the second millennium, and this linkage with blue blood was reflected in Charles Perrault's story of Bluebeard. In Maria Tatar's view, the color of his beard suggests otherworldly origins.

== In pop culture ==
=== Music ===
Mainstream musicians such as Loredana Bertè, Katy Perry, Lady Gaga, Halsey, and Alissa White-Gluz have dyed their hair blue along with hip-hop musicians such as Ashnikko, Latto, and others. In addition, K-pop acts such as BLACKPINK and other boy bands donned these.

=== Other visual media ===
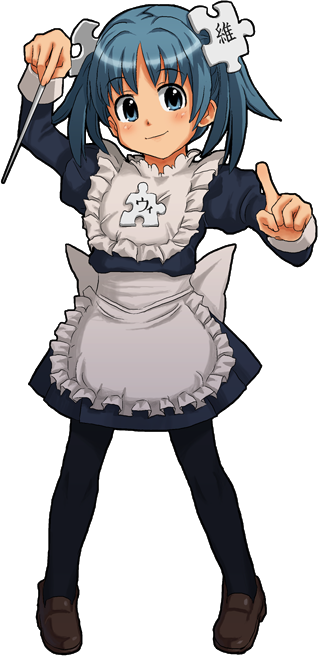
Wikipe-tan (personification of Wikipedia)

In The Simpsons, Marge Simpson is depicted as having blue hair, as are a number of other characters, including Chief Wiggum and Milhouse.

Ed, Edd n Eddy has two of their visible set of characters being blue-haired: Marie Kanker and Rolf.

2-D, the fictional singer of the British virtual band Gorillaz, has natural blue hair caused by a head injury after he fell out of a tree as a little boy.

Jok Church's character, Beakman, also has blue hair, which is a throwback reference, according to the creator, to an older version of Superman, who also had a blue tint to his hair. A similar case of bluish black hair can also be seen in Batman (Bruce Wayne) in his early comic appearances. This "blue tint technique" was very common to avoid any black hair to appear grizzled.

In anime and manga, characters with colored hair are common. Anime characters who have blue hair include Kido from Digimon, Bulma of the popular Dragon Ball series, Mana Takamiya of the Date A Live series, Sailor Mercury of the Sailor Moon series and Rei Ayanami of Neon Genesis Evangelion. One author, in writing of Rei, sees her hair color as a marker of both her "unearthliness" and her introversion. Strong Bad, from the animated webseries Homestar Runner, lampshades this trend by stating emphatically that in order to be a proper anime character, "You gotta have blue hair!"

The 2010 graphic novel Blue Is the Warmest Color and its 2013 film adaptation features a lesbian relationship between a teenage girl and an art student with blue hair.

== See also ==
- Black hair
- Blond hair
- Brown hair
- Red hair
- White hair
