= Blue envelope =

Communication support for autistic drivers

In American law enforcement, a blue envelope is a set of written instructions meant to assist encounters between law enforcement and drivers on the autism spectrum. The envelope holds the autistic person's driver's license, automobile registration, and insurance card, and is printed with instructions for both the driver and the law enforcement officer.

== Background ==
During encounters with law enforcement, autistic drivers frequently fail to make eye contact and react to commands rigidly. Law enforcement officers can misconstrue these behaviors as evasiveness, intentional conflict escalation, or driving under the influence. Officers are usually untrained to recognize and respond to signs of autism, and misunderstandings can lead to traumatic police response or arrest.

== Development and adoption ==
The blue envelope program was first developed in Connecticut in 2019. The bill to create the blue envelope was proposed by State Representative Liz Linehan, based on input from constituent Lynne Cariglio. The instructions on the envelope were co-written by autism advocates and Connecticut police representatives, who collaborated to better understand the needs of each side. The envelope was completed in fall 2019 and debuted in Connecticut on January 1, 2020.

In early 2021, concern was expressed that not enough autistic drivers were aware of it in Connecticut. As of April 2026, either the blue envelope program or a similar program had been formally adopted in 13 states. The Blue Envelope Program was introduced in Arizona in 2024 through administrative action rather than statute. Subsequent efforts have sought to codify the program in state law through legislation. In 2024, it was brought to Mahoning County, Ohio, and soon spread throughout northern Ohio in 2025. In December 2025, it was adopted in Dallas Township, Pennsylvania. In 2024, it was adopted by Massachusetts State Police; a bill to make blue envelopes universal in Massachusetts passed in May 2026. By May 2026, it had been adopted in over 70 agencies across Illinois and was under consideration as Illinois state law.
