= Jeffrey Schrier =

Jeffrey Schrier (born December 7, 1943) is an American visual artist. His art uses discarded or recycled objects to create modern interpretations of ancient or traditional texts, sometimes with references to Jewish themes. Schrier's "Wings of Witness" assemblage sculpture memorializes the victims of the Nazi holocaust with an installation of millions of soda-can tabs, collected by school-children, fashioned into an enormous pair of butterfly wings. The artist often uses educational workshops and volunteers in building his large-scale assemblage works.

== Education and career ==
Schrier was born in Cleveland, Ohio and educated at the Cleveland Institute of Art and California Institute of the Arts. A faculty member at Parsons School of Design from 1981 to 1991, he has also been a guest lecturer and artist in residence at Syracuse University and the State University of New York at Buffalo, and presented programs at Northwestern University, Quinnipiac University, Loyola Marymount University, the University of Houston and Hunter College. His work has been exhibited at the New-York Historical Society and the Cooper-Hewitt in Manhattan, the New York State Museum in Albany, New York, the George Eastman House in Rochester, New York and the Yeshiva University Museum in Manhattan. In 1997, Schrier completed a holocaust memorial to honor Raoul Wallenberg, commissioned for installation at the Simon Wiesenthal Museum of Tolerance in Los Angeles. Large-scale paintings in Schrier's "WrecKtify" series were displayed in 2010 at the H-Art Gallery in Peekskill, New York. Schrier illustrated, with his commentary, A Night of Questions, a Passover Haggadah for the Reconstructionist Press, edited by Rabbi Joy Levitt and Rabbi Michael Strassfeld. Schrier also wrote and illustrated On The Wings Of Eagles, a Sydney Taylor Book Award winner for Millbrook Press, telling the story of the rescue of the Jews of Ethiopia.

== Wings of Witness ==
In 1996–97, students at Mahomet-Seymour Junior High in Mahomet, Illinois, collected eleven million tabs as part of a class project to represent the numbers of persons murdered in Nazi Germany during the holocaust. Schrier heard of the school project and utilized the five tons of the aluminum tabs collected by the students to create an art installation. Working under Schrier's direction, volunteers helped fabricate "feathers" from the tabs, which were then laid out in a massive butterfly shape, a reference to a poem written by the young Czechoslovak poet Pavel Friedmann, who was murdered at Auschwitz. More than 50,000 project participants internationally have fashioned the tab collection into the Wings of Witness butterfly, which in 2011 weighed over ten tons.

Since its first installation at Mahomet-Seymour Junior High in 1998, Wings of Witness has been installed in several sites, including the Holocaust Museum Houston and the Katonah Museum of Art.

== Recognition and awards ==
Schrier's mass community works that address social and environmental issues continue to attract government and private foundation grant awards. Support for such works have come from the New York State Council on the Arts; Fulton County Arts Council, Atlanta, Georgia; Steven Spielberg's Righteous Persons Foundation, the Foundation for Jewish Culture, the Anti-Defamation League, the Brandeis-Bardin Institute, and the Irwin Uran Gift Fund of Loudoun County, Virginia, among others.
