= Dress blues =

Dress blues may refer to:

- Uniforms of the British Army § No.1: Temperate ceremonial, British Army dress uniform
- Uniforms of the Royal Marines § Number 1A Regimental Blues Dress - 'Blues'
- Army Service Uniform § Army Blue Service Uniform, of the United States Army
- Uniforms of the United States Marine Corps § Blue Dress
- Uniforms of the United States Navy § Service dress
- Uniforms of the United States Coast Guard § Dress uniforms
- "Dress Blues" (song), song by Jason Isbell from his 2007 album Sirens of the Ditch
