= Bloo =

Bloo may refer to:

- Bloo (EP), extended play by Kacy Hill
- Bloo (rapper) (born 1994), South Korean rapper
- Bloo, a character in Foster's Home for Imaginary Friends
- Bloo, a cheer tradition and identifier of the Bluecoats Drum and Bugle Corps, based in Canton, Ohio
- Sali Bloo, song on The Ivey's album Maybe Tomorrow
- Bloo, a VTuber created by YouTuber Kwebbelkop
