= Blue LoLãn =

American film director

- Known for: Filmmaking, music
- Website: blu.lol

Blue LoLãn (/ˈloʊlɔːn/ LOH-lawn), also known as Blu, is an American artist, animal activist, director, cinematographer, model, actress, musician, editor, animator, graphic designer, and photographer.

== Life and work ==
LoLãn starred in her first role in a Tom Petty music video with Luke Wilson and Robin Tunney. She has worked with directors Paul Thomas Anderson and John Hilcoat.

LoLãn has worked on videos for Apple, Facebook, and Pharrell.

LoLãn also performs as character Cindy Savalas, singing Italo disco, pop, shoegaze, and acting as Cindy, with vocals on the album, Memories of Cindy, and a Solo Album titled I'm Cindy.

LoLãn has been featured in magazines such as Elle Girl, Honey, Uniqlo’s first ever LifeWear Magazine, and more.

LoLãn is an animal activist, who has rescued several wild animals, such as deer, and is creating a documentary about it.

A campaign LoLãn directed in 2019 was nominated for a Webby Award.

== Discography ==
- I'm Cindy (2020 album)
- Memories of Cindy (2018 album)
