= The Blue EP =

The Blue EP may refer to:

- The Blue EP (Great White EP), 1991
- The Blue EP (Spy Glass Blue EP), 2003
- Blue, a 2006 EP by Bamboo Shoots
- The Blue EP (Death Cab for Cutie EP), 2019
- Powderfinger (EP), also known as Blue EP
- #BLUE, a 2025 EP by Kanii

== See also ==
- The Blue (disambiguation)
