= Bob Blue =

American singer-songwriter (1948–2006)

Bob Blue (July 31, 1948 – March 17, 2006) was an American teacher and songwriter. Blue was a native of Huntington, New York, and a resident of Massachusetts. His most well-known song, "The Ballad of Erica Levine", was occasionally performed by Mary Travers of Peter, Paul and Mary.

Blue was a member of the band The Nice Jewish Boys and one of the founders of the Children's Music Network.

His songs include "I Did It Their Way", which is a parody of the horrors of academic life sung to the tune of "My Way". It is on his cassette tape of the same name (a re-issuing of an LP called Erica Levine and Friends). The song is also available on Keepers 2, a collection album put out by Minnesota Public Radio and sung by Court Dorsey of Bright Morning Star. The original of this version is on Bright Morning Star's Sweet and Sour, Flying Fish Records, FF-478. It's also been heard Michael Cooney, "Fraser Union" out of Vancouver, BC. and Roy Bailey at the Australian National Folk Festival, Easter 1996.

In 2004, the Children's Music Network awarded Blue the Magic Penny Award for his contributions to children's music.

Blue had multiple sclerosis in the last years of his life, and died from it in his home at Amherst, Massachusetts, in 2006.

In 2010, Blue's daughter, Katy Blue, bicycled across the United States (from Vermont to Seattle, Washington) to raise money for the National MS Society.
