= Bluey Day Foundation =

Defunct Australian non-profit organisation

The Bluey Day Foundation was a not-for-profit organization in Australia that called upon national Police, Ambulance, Fire and Emergency Services, as well as the general community, to raise funds to support children with cancer and other serious illnesses. Karl David founded The Bluey Day Foundation in 1995. The Foundation ceased its activities in 2010, after having raised over $20 million Australian dollars for the benefit of children with cancer.

The chair of the Bluey Day Foundation was Neil Williamson.

== Bluey Day ==
Bluey Day was held annually in August and was one of the major fundraising campaigns where the emergency services and community came together to raise funds and shave their heads or go blue by colouring their hair or wearing something blue. Participants also have been known to colour their hair red, green and orange to represent their support from their own particular service.

== Adopt-A-Bluey ==
The 2009 Adopt-A-Bluey schools program is a way for schools to help 'Bluey' the blue healer raise awareness for kids with cancer and other illnesses. Each student in the class looks after their adopted Bluey and take turns to introduce the dog to their friends and family. The tradition continued to exist on some schools.
