= Bluing (fabric) =

Product used to improve optical whiteness of clothing or textiles

Bluing, laundry blue, dolly blue or washing blue is a household product used to improve the appearance of textiles, especially white fabrics. Used during laundering, it adds a trace of blue dye (often synthetic ultramarine, sometimes Prussian blue) to the fabric.

== Uses ==
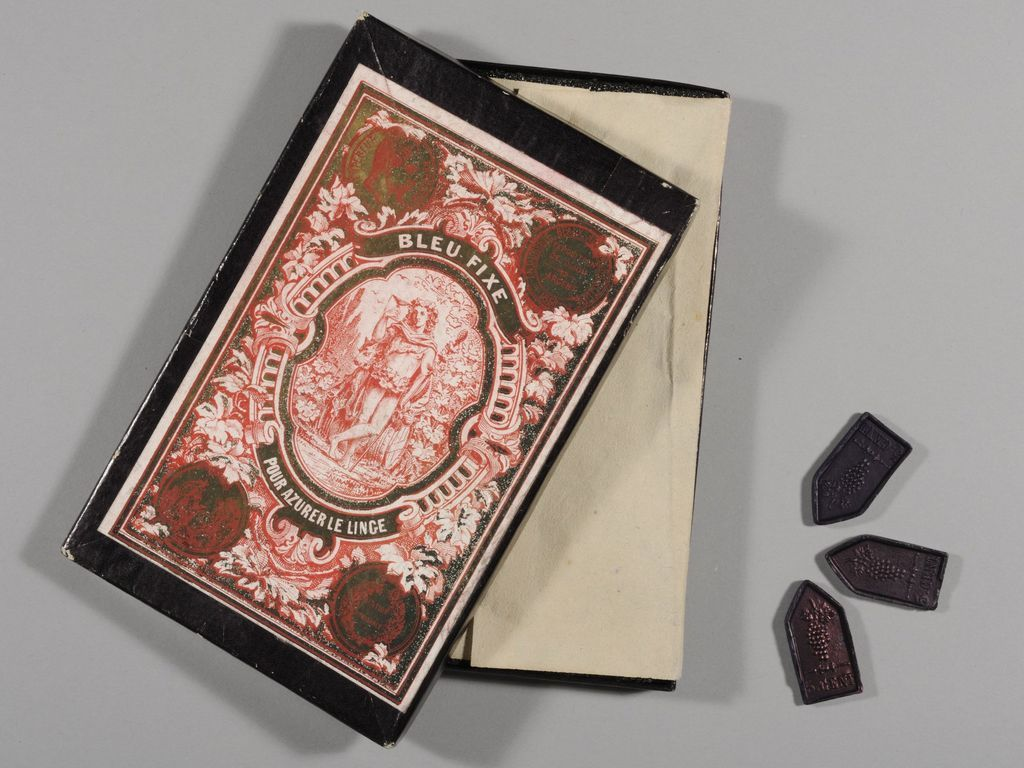
Laundry bluing kit from France, with the bluing pellets.

White fabrics acquire a slight color cast after use (usually grey or yellow). Since blue and yellow are complementary colors in the subtractive color model of color perception, adding a trace of blue color to the slightly off-white color of these fabrics makes them appear whiter. Laundry detergents may also use fluorescing agents to similar effect. Many white fabrics are blued during manufacturing. Bluing is not permanent and rinses out over time leaving dingy or yellowed whites. A commercial bluing product allows the consumer to add the bluing back into the fabric to restore whiteness.

On the same principle, bluing is sometimes used by white-haired people in a blue rinse.

Bluing has other miscellaneous household uses, including as an ingredient in rock crystal "gardens" (whereby a porous item is placed in a salt solution, the solution then precipitating out as crystals), and to improve the appearance of swimming-pool water. In Australia it was used as a folk remedy to relieve the itching of mosquito and sand fly bites.

Laundry bluing is made of a colloid of ferric ferrocyanide (blue iron salt, also referred to as "Prussian blue") in water.

Blue colorings have been added to rinse water for centuries, first in the form of powder blue or smalt, or by using small lumps of indigo and starch, called stone blue. After the invention of synthetic ultramarine and Prussian blue, it was manufactured by many companies, including Reckitt's Crown Blue in Hull, Lancashire Ultramarine Company's Dolly Blue in Backbarrow (later purchased by Reckitt & Sons), and Mrs. Stewart's Bluing in the United States. It was popular until the mid-twentieth century in the United Kingdom and the United States, and is still widely used in India and Pakistan. In many places, it has been replaced by bleach for its primary purpose.

Bluing is usually sold in liquid form, but it may also be a solid. Solid bluing is sometimes used by hoodoo doctors to provide the blue color needed for "mojo hands" without having to use the toxic compound copper(II) sulfate.

== See also ==
- Mrs. Stewart's Bluing
- Blue rinse
- Optical brightener
