= Cleveland Blues =

Cleveland Blues may refer to three separate professional baseball franchises based in Cleveland, Ohio, United States:

- Cleveland Blues (NL), a defunct franchise that played in the National League from 1879 to 1884
- Cleveland Guardians, a Major League Baseball team established in 1901 that was known as the Blues or Bluebirds in 1901 and 1902
- Cleveland Spiders, a defunct baseball team that played in the American Association and later the National League from 1887 to 1899 that was called the Blues for the 1887 and 1888 seasons
