= Bluey (nickname) =

Bluey is Australian slang for a redhead (usually a man).

As a nickname, Bluey may refer to:

- Bluey Adams (1935–2019), Australian rules football player
- David Bairstow (1951–1998), English cricketer
- Arthur Bluethenthal (1891–1918), American college football player and World War I pilot
- Gregory Brazel (born 1954), Australian serial killer
- Alex Burdon (1879–1943), pioneer Australian rugby league and rugby union footballer
- Greg Mackey (born 1961), Australian rugby league footballer
- Jean-Paul Maunick (born 1957), British musician, founder of the band Incognito
- Brian McClennan (born 1962), New Zealand rugby league footballer and coach
- Bob McClure (footballer) (1925–2003), Australian rules footballer
- Tim McGrath (born 1970), Australian rules footballer
- Guy McKenna (born 1969), Australian rules football coach and former player
- Ian Shelton (footballer) (1940–2021), Australian rules footballer
- Steve Southern (born 1982), Australian rugby league footballer
- Keith Truscott (1916–1943), Second World War fighter ace and Australian rules footballer
- Jack Watkins (rugby league) (1893–1974), Australian rugby league footballer
- Bluey Wilkinson (1911–1940), Australian speedway rider
- Billy Wilson (Australian rugby league) (1927–1993), Australian rugby league footballer

== See also ==
- Louie Bluie (1909–2003), U.S. musician
- Bluey (disambiguation)
