= BLUES =

Monitoring system for air pollution

BLUES is the abbreviation for the German "Bremer Luft UEberwachungs System" (which means literally "Air monitoring system of Bremen"). It is a monitoring system for air pollution and is being managed by the environmental authority in the German federal state of Bremen.

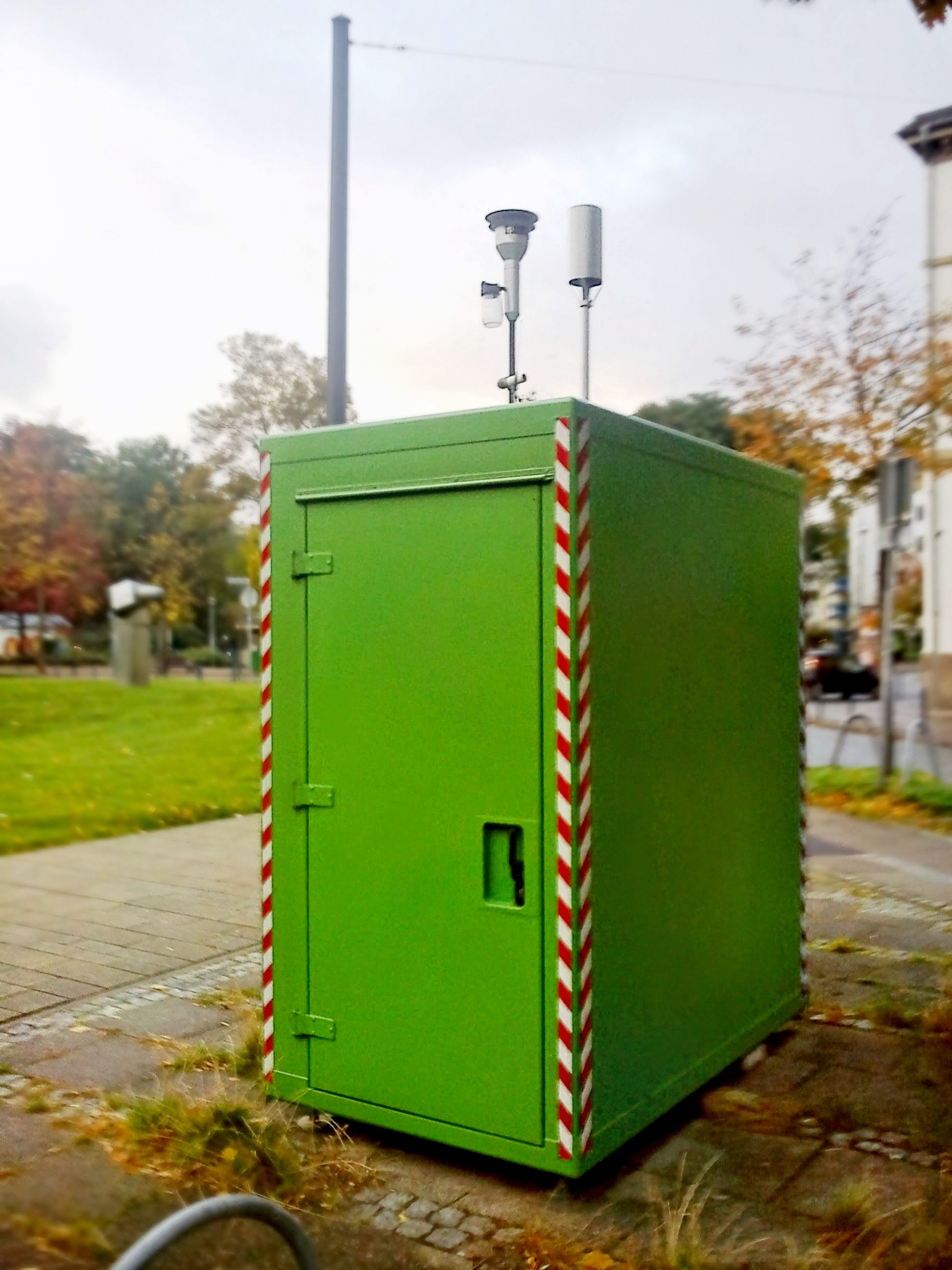
Air pollution measurement station in Bremen

Currently there are ten fixed locations in the state of Bremen to collect meteorological data and the following measurements:

- Particulates
- Nitrogen oxides
- Ozone
- Sulfur dioxide
- Carbon monoxide

These measurements are automatically detected and sent to the Network Management Centre. After the data processing, they are sent to the Federal Environment Agency in Germany. As part of the Bremer Environmental Information System, the results are also published in the Internet since 1999.

The monitoring network was set up in 1987 following the German smog directive. Two fixed stations were operated to monitor the emissions of traffic. There was also a measuring vehicle in use until 2005.
