= Blue (tourism magazine) =

Blue (ISSN 1093-7560) was an adventure travel magazine published six times year, founded in 1997 by Amy Schrier, with David Carson as the original design consultant. Its focus was on global adventure travel, and described itself as "a journal for the new traveler". It was published in New York City from 1997 until 2003. The New York Times characterized it as "not your father's National Geographic." The Christian Science Monitor described the magazine's "social agenda" as being part of its identity.

== History ==
At age 28, Amy Schrier founded Blue in 1997. She was publisher and editor-in-chief of the magazine from 1997 to 2003.

== Awards ==
The cover of its first issue was included in a list of the Top 40 magazine covers of the last 40 years by the American Society of Magazine Editors. The photo that was used had been submitted for an earlier magazine, Beach Culture.

Photographer Gary Fabiano's work for a story on refugee camps in Kosovo, was listed in 1999's Life magazine's Best Magazine Photos of the Year special issue, and was a runner-up in the 2000 Alfred Eisenstaedt Awards for Magazine Photography in the category of News (Photo Essay).

Folio: Magazine awarded Blue with first place in the Best Travel Editorial category in 2001, and second place in the Best Overall Designed Magazine category in 2002.
