= Blue rinse =

Hair coloring

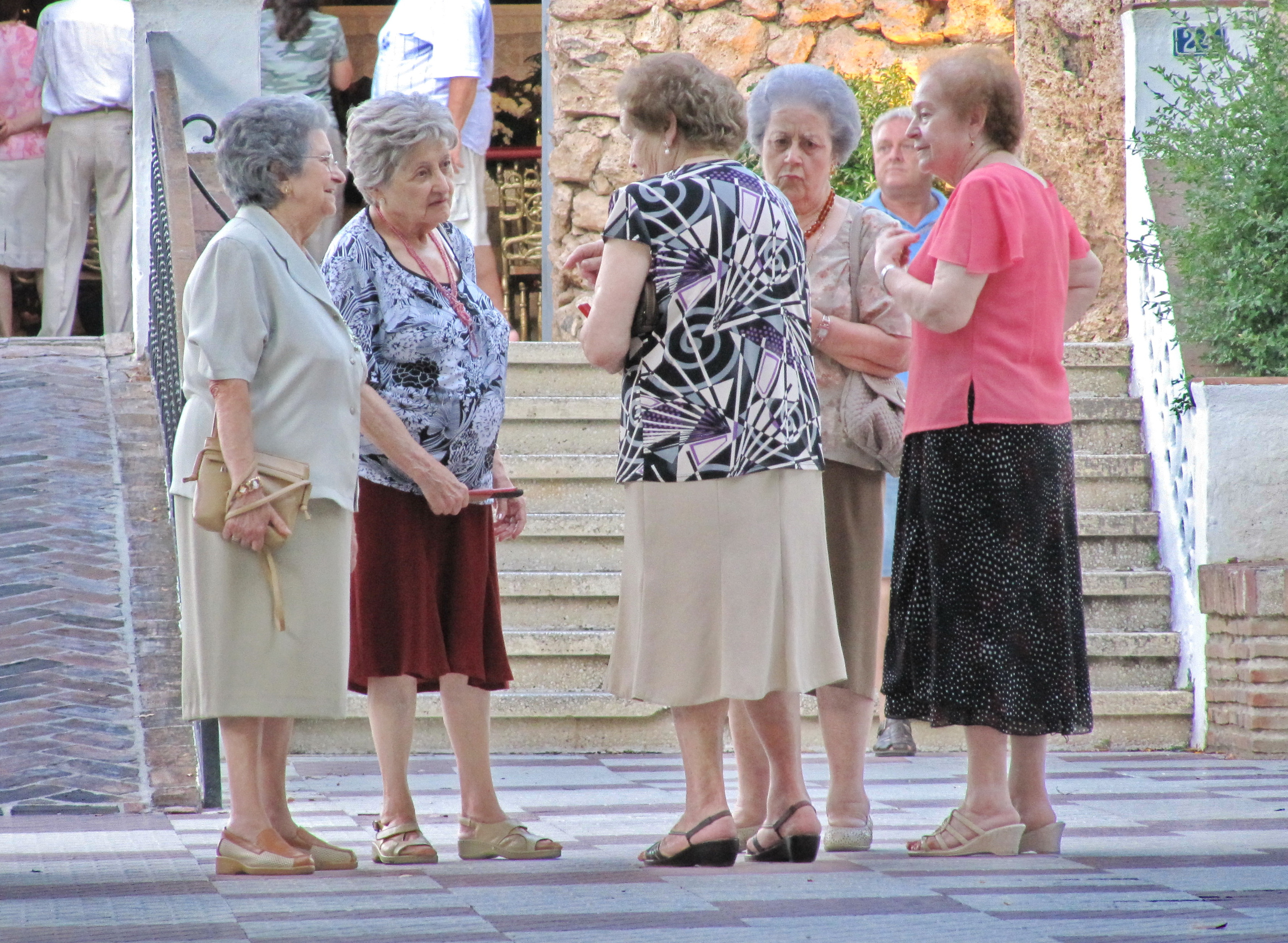
A group of Spanish women with blue-rinsed hair

A blue rinse is a dilute hair dye used to reduce the yellowed appearance of grey or white hair.

The blue rinse gained popularity after Jean Harlow's appearance in the 1930 film Hell's Angels. Queen Elizabeth the Queen Mother also contributed to the popularity of the blue rinse in the 1940s. Israeli politician Benjamin Netanyahu uses the style.

In British politics, the term "Blue Rinse Brigade" has been used to refer to affluent older women involved in conservative politics, charity work, and committees.

== See also ==
- Blue hair
