= Challenge of the Superfriends =

American animated television series

- Title card
- Genre: Adventure; Fantasy; Science fiction Superhero
- Created by: E. Nelson Bridwell; Carmine Infantino; Julius Schwartz (consultants)
- Based on: Justice League by: Gardner Fox
- Written by: Jeffrey Scott
- Directed by: Ray Patterson; Carl Urbano
- Creative director: Iwao Takamoto
- Voices of: Jack Angel; Marlene Aragon; Michael Bell; Bill Callaway; Ted Cassidy; Danny Dark; Shannon Farnon; Ruth Forman; Buster Jones; Stanley Jones; Casey Kasem; Don Messick; Vic Perrin; Stanley Ross; Dick Ryal; Michael Rye; Olan Soule; Jimmy Weldon; Frank Welker; Louise Williams
- Narrated by: William Woodson
- Music by: Hoyt Curtin
- Country of origin: United States
- Original language: English
- No. of seasons: 2
- No. of episodes: 16 (32 segments) (list of episodes)

Production
- Executive producers: William Hanna; Joseph Barbera
- Producer: Don Jurwich
- Cinematography: George Epperson; Tom Epperson; Charles Flekal; Ron Jackson; Jerry Smith; Larry Smith; Terry Smith; Brandy Whittington; Jerry Whittington
- Running time: 45 minutes (20 minutes per segment)
- Production companies: Hanna-Barbera Productions; DC Comics

Original release
- Network: ABC
- Release: September 9 – December 23, 1978

Related
- Super Friends (1973); The All-New Super Friends Hour; The World's Greatest SuperFriends; Super Friends (1980); Super Friends: The Legendary Super Powers Show; The Super Powers Team: Galactic Guardians

Challenge of the Superfriends is an American animated television series about a team of superheroes which ran from September 9 to December 23, 1978, on ABC. The complete series (16 episodes) was produced by Hanna-Barbera Productions and is based on the Justice League and associated comic book characters published by DC Comics and created by Julius Schwartz, Gardner Fox and Mike Sekowsky. It was the third series of Super Friends cartoons, following the original Super Friends in 1973 and The All-New Super Friends Hour in 1977.

== Format ==
=== First segment ===
As originally aired, this season featured adventures with Superman, Batman and Robin, Wonder Woman, Aquaman, and the Wonder Twins, similar to those that had aired the previous season in The All-New Super Friends Hour. These episodes were later shown using the opening credits of The All-New Super Friends Hour in syndication.

=== Second segment ===
The second segment of this season was Challenge of the Superfriends, a 16-episode series that came the closest to the comic books. Not only did Challenge have the Justice League of America, but it was also the first official Super Friends series to feature DC supervillains from the comics (apart from one episode with Gentleman Jim Craddock and another featuring Black Manta), and this series had 13 of them together as a group called the Legion of Doom. It included Superman foes like Lex Luthor, Brainiac, the Toyman, and Bizarro, and Batman foes like the Riddler and the Scarecrow. The Legion of Doom dwelt in a murky swamp and launched their attacks for global conquest from a sinister-looking, swamp-based, mechanical, flying headquarters called the Hall of Doom (which resembled Darth Vader's helmet) as a suitable contrast with the Superfriends' gleaming Hall of Justice. Every week, the Legion schemed to either get rid of or destroy the Superfriends so they could conquer the world. The Superfriends themselves consisted of 11 Justice League heroes. Thanks to the second segment alone being used with the Challenge of the Superfriends opening and confusing references to the show, it is often mistakenly believed that the first and second segments were two separate shows.

== Production background ==
=== Early development ===
When the Challenge of the Superfriends season was originally conceived, it was named "Battle of the Super Friends" and featured the introduction of Captain Marvel. The group that challenged the heroes was called the "League of Evil", led by Captain Marvel's nemesis Doctor Sivana. Filmation however produced Shazam! and The New Adventures of Batman, which prevented the use of characters such as Mister Atom, King Kull, Beautia Sivana, the Joker, the Penguin, Mr. Freeze, and Catwoman. Early conceptual art drawn by Alex Toth also included Heat Wave, Poison Ivy, and Abra Kadabra.

=== Narration, music and character designs ===
Bill Woodson provides the uncredited voice of the narrator in Challenge of the Superfriends, and the opening narration was by Stanley Jones. The show's main theme and original music was composed and conducted by musical director Hoyt Curtin. The music supervisor was Paul DeKorte. Character designs for this particular Super Friends series were done by Andre LeBlanc.

=== Team composition experimentation ===
Hanna-Barbera's writers experimented with team composition as well. Challenge of the Superfriends added The Flash (Barry Allen), Green Lantern (Hal Jordan), and Hawkman (Katar Hol) who were members of the Justice League of America, as well as several new characters: Black Vulcan (who was based on the DC Comics character Black Lightning), Apache Chief, and Samurai. These characters were created to add racial and cultural diversity to the show (this was also mentioned in some of the episode introduction extras on the first two Challenge of the Super Friends DVDs).

== Lineups ==
=== Super Friends/Justice League of America ===
Eleven heroes make up the Superfriends/Justice League of America. They are:

- Superman
- Batman
- Robin
- Wonder Woman
- Black Vulcan
- The Flash

- Green Lantern
- Apache Chief
- Aquaman
- Samurai
- Hawkman

=== Legion of Doom ===
Thirteen villains comprise the Legion of Doom during the Challenge of the Superfriends series. They are:

- Lex Luthor
- Solomon Grundy
- Sinestro
- Black Manta
- The Cheetah
- Giganta
- The Scarecrow

- The Toyman
- The Riddler
- Bizarro
- Brainiac
- Captain Cold
- Gorilla Grodd

Despite the claim in the program's title sequence that the Legion's members hail from "remote galaxies," only Brainiac and Sinestro are extraterrestrials; the remaining members are all natives of Earth (even though Bizarro called the Bizarro World home, he was created by Lex Luthor via a duplicator ray on Earth, technically making him a 'native' of Earth). Solomon Grundy is a zombie, an animated dead person, as the episode Monolith of Evil makes clear. In "History of Doom," even Solomon Grundy supposedly dies from the solar flare.

== Voice cast ==
- Jack Angel – Flash, Hawkman, Samurai, Pierre Marcel (in "Battle at the Earth's Core"), Professor Nikaido (in "Journey Through Inner Space"), Fort Knox Guard (in "Wanted: The Superfriends"), Japanese Distress Caller (in "Monolith of Evil"), Soldier (in "Superfriends: Rest in Peace"), Cheshire Cat (in "Fairy Tale of Doom"), Zeus (in "Battle of the Gods"), Invisible Man (in "Battle of the Gods"), Stone Gladiator (in "Battle of the Gods")
- Marlene Aragon – Cheetah, Queen of Hearts (in "Fairy Tale of Doom"), Hippolyta, Witch (in "Swamp of the Living Dead"), Young Giganta (in "History of Doom"), Hera (in "Battle of the Gods"), Lois Lane (in "Superfriends: Rest in Peace"), Sooba (in "History of Doom")
- Lewis Bailey – Captain Parkhouse (in "Doomsday"), Yerba's right-hand man (in "Conquerors of the Future)
- Michael Bell – Riddler, Zan, Gleek, Fearians (in "Invasion of the Fearians"), Rom-Lok (in "Terror From the Phantom Zone"), Young Lex Luthor (in "History of Doom"), Pete (in "Trial of the Superfriends"), Robot Outlaw (in "Batman: Dead or Alive"), Dr. Tomokawa (in "Journey Through Inner Space")
- Bill Callaway – Aquaman, Bizarro, Flash (in "Wanted: The SuperFriends), The Capricorn Kid (in "Batman: Dead or Alive"), Bizarro Alfred Pennyworth (in "Wanted: The Superfriends"), Robot Gangsters (in "The Rise and Fall of the Superfriends")
- Ted Cassidy – Brainiac, Black Manta, Barlocks (in "Conquerors from the Future"), Diamond Exchange Man (in "Superfriends: Rest in Peace"), British Soldier (in "The Giants of Doom"), Gorilla Guard (in "Revenge on Gorilla City")
- Melanie Chartoff – Female Scientist (in "The Anti-Matter Monster")
- Henry Corden – Dr. Varga (in "Invasion of the Brain Creatures"), Brain Creature Leader (in "Invasion of the Brain Creatures"), North Pole Scientist (in "Invasion of the Brain Creatures"), Torahna (in "The World Beneath the Ice")
- Danny Dark – Superman, Commissioner James Gordon (in "Superfriends: Rest in Peace"), Superboy (in "History of Doom"), U.S. Mint Guard (in "Wanted: The Superfriends"), Man in Car (in "Monolith of Evil"), Radar Engineer (in "Doomsday"), Darkon's Robot Soldiers (in "The Demons of Exxor")
- Al Fann - Marine Base Commander (in "The Beasts Are Coming")
- Shannon Farnon – Wonder Woman, Aphrodite (in "Secret Origins of the Superfriends"), Empress Xana (in "The World's Deadliest Game"), Swiss Scientist (in "Attack of the Vampire"), Medusa (in "Battle of the Gods"), Simora (in "Conquerors of the Future"), Raymara (in "The World Beneath the Ice"), Dr. Brooks (in "Invasion of the Brain Creatures"), Japanese Scientist (in "Journey Through Inner Space")
- Ruth Forman – Giganta
- Bob Hastings – Pied Piper/Space Genius (in "The Pied Piper from Space")
- Bob Holt – Count Dracula (in "Attack of the Vampire"), Vienna Policeman (in "Attack of the Vampire"), Swiss Scientist (in "Attack of the Vampire"), Logar (in "Terror From the Phantom Zone"), Hong Kong Citizen (in "Terror From the Phantom Zone"), Australian Citizen (in "Terror From the Phantom Zone"), Gormack (in "The World Beneath the Ice"), Ozar (in "The World Beneath the Ice"), Correl (in "The World Beneath the Ice"), Brain Creature (in "Invasion of the Brain Creatures"), Telegraph Operator (in "Batman: Dead or Alive"), Robot Outlaw (in "Batman: Dead or Alive")
- Buster Jones – Black Vulcan, U.N. Representative (in "Trial of the Superfriends"), Plutonium Plant Guard (in "Swamp of the Living Dead"), Skier (in "Fairy Tale of Doom"), Galactic Police Officer (in "Doomsday"), Admiral Brighton (in "Sinbad and the Space Pirates")
- Stanley Jones – Lex Luthor, Opening Narration, Augustus Caesar (in "The Time Trap"), Evil Being (in "Swamp of the Living Dead"), Giant (in "Fairy Tale of Doom"), Hul (in "Terror from the Phantom Zone"), Jonathan Kent (in "Secret Origins of the Superfriends"), Jor-El (in "Secret Origins of the Superfriends"), Lord Darkon (in "Demons of Exxor"), Camelot Knight (in "The Time Trap"), Sinbad (in "Sinbad and the Space Pirates"), Fort Knox Guard (in "Wanted: The Superfriends"), Townsman #2 (in "Trial of the Superfriends"), Gorilla Guard (in "Revenge on Gorilla City"), Scotland Yard Man (in "Conquerors of the Future"), Manatoo (in "History of Doom"), Toran (in "The Incredible Space Circus")
- Casey Kasem – Robin, JLA Computer, Colorado Soldier (in "Superfriends: Rest in Peace"), Man from Parthenon (in "The Giants of Doom"), Space Pirate (in "Sinbad and the Space Pirates"), Subway Switchman (in "Conquerors of the Future"), Likan (in "Conquerors of the Future"), Professor Charleston (in "The Rise and Fall of the Superfriends")
- Don Messick – Scarecrow, Sinestro (later episodes), Astronaut #2 (in "Giants of Doom"), Domed City Ruler (in "Conquerors from the Future"), Fear-Gassed Gorilla (in "Revenge on Gorilla City"), Vartoo (in "The Final Challenge"), Mocking Kryptonian (in "Secret Origins of the Superfriends"), Ground Quake Kryptonian (in "Secret Origins of the Superfriends"), Plutonium Plant Guard (in "Swamp of the Living Dead"), White Rabbit (in "Fairy Tale of Doom")
- Vic Perrin – Sinestro (in "Invasion of the Fearians" and "The Time Trap"), Dr. Starns (in "The Anti-Matter Monster"), Turkish Engineer (in "The Anti-Matter Monster"), Brain Creature (in "Invasion of the Brain Creatures"), Professor Reed (in "The Rise and Fall of the Superfriends"), Frankenstein's Monster (in "The Rise and Fall of the Superfriends")
- Renny Roker – U.N. Representative (in "The Pied Piper from Space")
- Stanley Ralph Ross – Gorilla Grodd, Nar-Tan (in "Doomsday"), Old Indian (in "History of Doom"), Darkon's Robot Soldiers (in "The Demons of Exxor"), Space Pirate (in "Sinbad and the Space Pirates"), Minotaur (in "Battle of the Gods")
- Dick Ryal – Captain Cold, Hall of Doom Computer, Abin Sur (in "Secret Origins of the Superfriends"), Captain Nemo's Sailor (in "Fairy Tale of Doom"), Gorilla Tracker (in "Revenge on Gorilla City")
- Michael Rye – Green Lantern, Apache Chief, Astronaut #1 (in "Giants of Doom"), Yerba (in "Conquerors from the Future"), Solovar (in "Revenge on Gorilla City"), Plutonium Plant Guard (in "Swamp of the Living Dead"), Sinbad's First Mate (in "Sinbad and the Space Pirates"), Vienna Policeman (in “Attack of the Vampire”)
- Olan Soule – Batman, Astronaut (in "The World's Deadliest Game"), Vol (in "Demons of Exxor"), Fort Knox Guard (in "Wanted: The Superfriends"), Scientist (in "The Time Trap"), Townsman #1 (in "Trial of the Superfriends"), Space Pirate (in "Sinbad and the Space Pirates"), Subway Engineer (in "Conquerors of the Future"), Train Passenger (in "Conquerors of the Future"), Darkon's Robot Soldiers (in "The Demons of Exxor")
- Jimmy Weldon – Solomon Grundy, Sphinx (in "Battle of the Gods")
- Frank Welker – Toyman, Lilliputians (in "Fairy Tale of Doom"), Rokan (in "Rokan: Enemy from Space"), Mister Mxyzptlk (in "The Rise and Fall of the Superfriends"), Wind-Up Baby (in "The World's Deadliest Game"), Wind-Up Cat (in "The World's Deadliest Game"), Gorilla Child (in "Revenge on Gorilla City"), Mort (in "Conquerors of the Future"), Caterpillar (in "Fairy Tale of Doom")
- Louise Williams – Jayna, Aphrodite (in "Battle of the Gods")
- Bill Woodson – Narrator, Perry White (in "Superfriends: Rest in Peace"), Rayno (in "History of Doom"), Captain Nemo (in "Fairy Tale of Doom"), Admiral Hubbard (in "Doomsday"), Dr. Willardson (in "The Incredible Space Circus"), Sheriff (in "Batman: Dead or Alive"), Japanese Scientist (in "Journey Through Inner Space")

== Episodes ==
No. overall	No. in season	Title	Original release date
32a	1a	"The Demons of Exxor"	September 9, 1978
The Wonder Twins agree to help Exxor defeat Darkon, a conqueror who has taken over Exxor and made its inhabitants his slaves. With the Wonder Twins captured by Darkon, Batman and Robin must free the twin heroes as the other Super Friends tackle Darkon and his troopers.
32b	1b	"Wanted: The Super Friends"	September 9, 1978
Lex Luthor forms a criminal gang called the "Legion of Doom" and uses a dream-machine to make the Super Friends commit crimes. When the Super Friends are forced to turn themselves in to police headquarters, the guards reveal themselves to be Bizarro and the Cheetah, who send the Super Friends to the sun. The Legion of Doom then uses the Justice League satellite with Luthor's mutation device to turn women into Cheetah clones and men into Bizarro clones, long enough for them to commit profitable robberies. The Super Friends return to Earth to reverse the damage done and retake The Hall of Justice. They then disguise themselves as Bizarro and Cheetah clones to stop the Legion of Doom. Note: Starting in this episode, Black Vulcan's costume now leaves his legs bare.
33a	2a	"Rokan: Enemy from Space"	September 16, 1978
From the edge of the Milky Way, a winged creature named Rokan speeds toward Earth. Superman confronts the beast and realizes it is Rokan, a beast from Krypton which was thought to be extinct, and since Rokan is from Krypton, she has the same powers as Superman. Escaping, the creature wreaks havoc on Earth. The Super Friends attempt to stop Rokan by chasing her and her babies away with kryptonite.
33b	2b	"Invasion of the Fearians"	September 16, 1978
Captain Cold recruits the Fearians (inhabitants of Venus) to help the Legion of Doom take over the world and destroy the Super Friends. The Fearians say that the Legion has to make the environment suitable for Fearian life forms first, so Captain Cold freezes the world. When the Flash defrosts it, great quantities of steam make the temperature higher. Black Manta sets fire to an island in the Pacific Ocean. When Aquaman uses a great tidal wave to put out the flames, the water floods inland, making more plants grow. Sinestro sends six comets to Earth. When Green Lantern moves Earth out of its usual orbit to save it, the temperature rises even higher. The Fearians can now enter Earth to make it "Venus II".
34a	3a	"Battle at the Earth's Core"	September 23, 1978
While sailing with Captain Pierre Marcel, the Wonder Twins and Gleek get sucked in a whirlpool. After receiving a distress call from the Wonder Twins, the rest of the Super Friends search for the twins, only to get pulled in the whirlpool themselves. They emerge in a Wonder Land that is below the Earth's crust. The Super Friends must now search for the Wonder Twins and rescue them.
34b	3b	"The World's Deadliest Game"	September 23, 1978
Brainiac uses a cloaking device to make the Earth appear to vanish. When Wonder Woman, Hawkman and Black Vulcan are in deep space trying to find it, the Toyman sends a phony distress message that leads them to his sinister black hole planet of toy traps. The Riddler then uses his super-riddles to lead the other Super Friends on a wild goose chase that sends them to their doom, but the efforts of Superman and Green Lantern foil their attempt and save Hawkman, Black Vulcan and Wonder Woman.
35a	4a	"Sinbad and the Space Pirates"	September 30, 1978
Captain Sinbad and his band of space pirates come to Earth and start plundering the treasures of an Incan temple in Peru. In Mexico City, they continue treasure hunting at the Aztec temple until Superman and Wonder Woman intercept them, but the ships turn invisible, giving the heroes the slip. When each of the three ships go to a different location, so do the Super Friends. Batman and Robin go to Easter Island, where they are nearly goners after the Batjet goes out of control by means of the pirates' anti-gravity beam. Aquaman finds one at the Bermuda Triangle, only to be attacked by two hypnotized octopuses. Superman and Wonder Woman find Sinbad at Stonehenge, but Superman gets sidetracked by stopping the large stones from hitting London while Wonder Woman is captured and hypnotized. The Wonder Twins try to rescue her but end up captured and forced to row on an electronic oar. Superman (as Clark Kent) sneaks aboard Sinbad's ship as the pirate tries to get to a treasure under the Golden Gate Bridge. He breaks Wonder Woman's spell with her own magic lasso, and with teamwork from the Dynamic Duo, Sinbad is defeated and taken to the galactic authorities.
35b	4b	"The Time Trap"	September 30, 1978
Gorilla Grodd invents an inter-spacial time conveyor to allow anyone to travel through the time portal. Black Manta and Giganta trap Aquaman and Apache Chief in 70,000,000 BC and rob the diamond mines of South Africa. Sinestro and Captain Cold trap Green Lantern and Samurai in AD 500 and rob King Arthur's treasure. Grodd and Solomon Grundy trap Batman and Robin in ancient Rome and rob the treasures of Julius Caesar. Aquaman and Apache Chief managed to find the exact future location of the Hall of Justice, where Aquaman buries his communicator which has a power source with a multi-million year lifetime of use. In the present, the Super Friends detect the communicator, deduce where and when it came from, allowing Superman eventually to rescue all his comrades in the past. The Legion of Doom learn a hard lesson in underestimating the Super Friends when they are foiled once more.
36a	5a	"The Pied Piper from Space"	October 7, 1978
Traveling from a distant corner of the universe, a fleet of unidentified ships head towards Earth to hypnotize all children and gather them to Monument Valley, Arizona. The Super Friends start to take action after the Wonder Twins became hypnotized and a call from the Justice League TroubAlert. After the Super Friends tried to stop the children from entering a spaceship, a UFO arose to destroy a nearby city. Batman and Robin stayed with the children as Superman and Wonder Woman stopped the UFO and the disasters it caused, only to get trapped inside the space craft as it heads to the Anti-Matter Universe. Meanwhile, at the Hall of Justice, the Wonder Twins escape by using hypnotic mind control on Aquaman to release themselves. Batman and Robin arrive back at the Hall of Justice to stop a nearby power source overload and snap Aquaman out of a mindless slumber. The Super Friends must now rescue the cargo of children and the Wonder Twins from slavery by an evil genius from the planet Nofan and bring them safely home to Earth.
36b	5b	"Trial of the Super Friends"	October 7, 1978
Batman, Robin, Wonder Woman and Green Lantern guard the liquid light in the Astro-Chemical Research Plant. The Cheetah however secretly steals Wonder Woman's Lasso of Truth, Brainiac steals Green Lantern's power ring and the Scarecrow steals Batman and Robin's utility belts. The three villains escape, and the Hall of Doom captures and puts the four heroes on a kangaroo court trial. Sinestro uses the power devices stolen by the three villains as evidence to prove the Super Friends are guilty. Brainiac punishes them by making them fight his android duplicates of them, and the captured Super Friends must save themselves from their own devices before it is too late.
37a	6a	"Attack of the Vampire"	October 14, 1978
In the remote heights of the Transylvania Alps, Dracula awakes after a 100-year sleep. Dracula starts havoc by releasing a strange glowing powder that turns people into vampires. Meanwhile, Batman and Robin receive a distress call and speed off to Transylvania. They search Dracula's castle, only to get captured by Dracula himself. Later Wonder Woman and Aquaman arrive in Transylvania after the Wonder Twins report it was taken over by bats, only to be attacked by dozens of mindless vampires. Another report of vampire attacks was made and this time Superman went to Vienna to stop them. While in Vienna, Superman runs into Dracula, who was continuing his plans of conquest, and gets turned into a vampire. Realizing Superman is under Dracula's control, the Wonder Twins attempt to stop the victimized Man of Steel. Wonder Woman, Aquaman, Batman, and Robin all escape the face of danger, only to find that Superman and the Wonder Twins have been turned into vampires and are turning nearly everyone else into vampires as well. The four Super Friends regroup at the Biological Research Center in Switzerland to find a way to reverse the effects the vampires have on people. They now must find a strange breed of South American bat in the Andes Mountains whose cave has gases that could reverse the vampire effect. It is now up to the Super Friends to transform the vampires back to normal and figure out a way to stop Dracula.
37b	6b	"Monolith of Evil"	October 14, 1978
Solomon Grundy convinces the Legion of Doom to find the "Monolith of Evil" which gave him his powers where it revived him from his death. When he, Grodd, the Cheetah and the Riddler cannot retrieve it, the Riddler tricks the Super Friends into fetching it for them by using a mirage to make it look like the Legion of Doom shrunk the United Nations building, but they are in for a surprise when the Super Friends learn the truth of the Monolith's powers. They use it to put the Legion of Doom in their place — as the Monolith itself is not inherently evil, but acts upon the thoughts (evil or good) of whoever controls it.
38a	7a	"The Beasts Are Coming"	October 21, 1978
After an experimental satellite from Kennedy Space Center falls back to Earth it breaks, releasing deadly radioactive energy. The Super Friends then receive a distress call from the West Coast saying Death Valley is being overrun by giant desert beasts. Wonder Woman and the Wonder Twins stay behind to check the Justice League computer for more information, while the rest of the Super Friends head to Death Valley. At Death Valley they find wreckage and a man who says giant lizards had nearly destroyed the town. As Superman continues to search for the mysterious giant beasts, he stumbles upon some mutated giant earthworms that he must save some teens from. As Aquaman, Batman, and Robin fight the creatures that attacked them, Wonder Woman finds out what happened via the Justice League computer and heads to NASA for more information. As Wonder Woman approaches the location of the downed satellite, the radiation turns her into a giant beast. As the Wonder Twins try to stop Wonder Woman's destruction of a military base, the radiation genetically alters them into giant beasts. Meanwhile, giant earthworms are digging holes into California's coast, which will potentially sink. To save everyone, the Super Friends must stop the creatures and turn them and the "Wonder" heroes back to normal.
38b	7b	"The Giants of Doom"	October 21, 1978
Bizarro has created a "giant ray" device that can turn anyone into 100-foot giants and uses it with the Justice League computer to transform himself, Sinestro, the Toyman and Captain Cold into giants. Each of them take over a continent of the world, but there is one catch: the Super Friends, after being helplessly hurled to Saturn, escape from their imprisonment and find out a way to use Bizarro's ray to stop them. Bizarro did not count on the Justice League's computer analysis that Bizarro thought the Super Friends would never be able to return. They unknowingly left traces of elements used by the device to turn Superman, Batman, the Flash and Green Lantern into 100-foot giants to combat their foes.
39a	8a	"Terror from the Phantom Zone"	October 28, 1978
Three Kryptonian villains from the Phantom Zone escape and expose Superman to red kryptonite causing him to age rapidly. The rest of the Super Friends get trapped by the villains and only Superman can free them from the Phantom Zone. Meanwhile, the Justice League Computer tells Superman the only possible antidote for his rapid aging is blue kryptonite. Since blue kryptonite is harmful to Bizarro, it may have an opposite effect on Superman. Superman must take the Supermobile to go to the site where Krypton blew up and get the blue kryptonite in time to save the other Super Friends. Using the ray device the three villains stole from Superman, he sends the Kryptonian villains back to the Phantom Zone. Note: The three Kryptonian villains were new ones created for this series and have never appeared in DC Comics' original continuity.
39b	8b	"Secret Origins of the Super Friends"	October 28, 1978
Lex Luthor has discovered the origins of Superman, Wonder Woman and Green Lantern. He proposes for the Legion of Doom to travel back in time and prevent them from existing. The Cheetah cheats in a tournament and becomes Wonder Woman, Lex Luthor becomes Green Lantern, and the Legion of Doom alter baby Kal-El's spaceship away from Earth. However, after taking the other more obscure Super Friends prisoner, Batman, Robin, the Flash, and Black Vulcan find a tape of the plan that was carried out and use the Justice League computer to find gaps in its memory, confirming that history was altered. They travel back in time, rectify Luthor's meddling and gain back their teammates.
40a	9a	"The Anti-Matter Monster"	November 4, 1978
In this story, the Super Friends have to stop an energy draining monster which exists on computer tape and can appear anywhere at any time. Wonder Woman and Superman, during one scene, go undercover as a science expert and Clark Kent, in an attempt to learn how the energy creature can be destroyed. One of the scientists working in the lab turns out to be the culprit responsible for unleashing the energy creature. The story borrows heavily from the national headlines of the time during the concerns of a looming energy crisis.
40b	9b	"Revenge on Gorilla City"	November 4, 1978
Gorilla Grodd attempts to take over his homeland of Gorilla City (a society of intelligent gorillas) with a mind-altering vapor that induces fear in its inhabitants, but King Solovar has protected himself from the vapor and has Grodd banished as he was before for attempting to overthrow him. Brainiac has created a brain-wave amplifier to control anyone in a 1000-mile radius. Grodd convinces him to use it to take over Gorilla City. Solovar escapes before its activation and asks the Super Friends for their aid in stopping the Legion of Doom, who now control all the inhabitants of Gorilla City and wreak havoc upon an unsuspecting Africa.
41a	10a	"World Beneath the Ice"	November 11, 1978
The Super Friends must stop the plans of a conqueror named Torhana who seeks vengeance on the people of the surface world by freezing everything in his path. Torhana and his crew travel by ship, freezing oceans and continents and people. Aquaman uses his telepathy to summon sword-fish to cut him out of the ice and take him to Atlantis. Torhana and his crew appear to have the upper hand, but by episode's end the Super Friends regroup and come up with a clever plan to melt all of the ice that's engulfed the planet. Note: This is one of the few episodes that features Aquaman at his usual base of operations in the comic books: the undersea city of Atlantis.
41b	10b	"Swamp of the Living Dead"	November 11, 1978
The Legion of Doom makes a deal with an old swamp sorceress and her demon — an equivalent amount of the power of good in exchange for an equivalent amount of the power of evil. In order to gain that power of evil, the Legion decides to give the demon the Super Friends as the power of good. The Super Friends are captured and put to sleep in coffins, but in the Legion of Doom's greed for more power, they capture the demon, believing he would give them an infinite source of power, and pay the price for it when he uses his powers to escape. Offended by this, he summons his army of zombies to attack them. This forces the Legion of Doom to release the imprisoned Super Friends. The old swamp sorceress tells them of a tactic to defeat the zombies in exchange for letting the Legion of Doom go. When she feels that the balance of power must be balanced for her performing a positive spell, she turns on the Super Friends and reveals that she and the demon were one and the same.
42a	11a	"Invasion of the Brain Creatures"	November 18, 1978
While in space, Batman and Superman become possessed by brain creatures. The brain creatures ultimately take over the minds of Wonder Woman, Robin, and Aquaman when it appears that the Wonder Twins are successfully defeating Batman and Superman's asteroid attack of Earth. Batman and Superman, while under mind control, continue to attack Earth by firing huge asteroids on the surface. Superman uses his speed to hurl multiple asteroids at Earth's surface, which causes fissures, fires and floods. Wonder Woman uses her mental powers to overcome the mind control and with the help of a magnetic cloud the brain creatures are expelled from the brains of Wonder Woman, Aquaman, Robin, Batman, and Superman. Wonder Woman then devises a plan to send an electric current throughout Earth and trap the brain creatures, after which Superman uses a laser gun and sends the brain creatures many light years away from Earth.
42b	11b	"Conquerors of the Future"	November 18, 1978
The Legion of Doom has suddenly started acting heroic, much to the shocking surprise of the Super Friends. When a distress signal is transmitted to the Justice League computer, the Legion of Doom (acting as the Legion of Good) offers to help instead, but this proves to be a ruse in order for them to travel in time to the year AD 3984 to finally conquer Earth, aided by a savage group of futuristic mutants. With the Riddler leaving cryptic clues easily broken by Batman, the Super Friends learn in a much further century about their takeover and travel to 3984 to foil them.
43a	12a	"The Incredible Space Circus"	November 25, 1978
A crooked space circus proprietor, Zarnum, uses a device to turn protected animals that have been illegally captured into beasts to boost attendance at his space circus. Sensing that the Super Friends are on to his scheme, he uses the device to change Wonder Woman, Aquaman, and the Wonder Twins into space creatures. It is up to Superman, Batman and Robin to track down the elusive space circus, rescue the captive Super Friends, and bring an end to the poaching that has been taking place. Note: Zarnum's name seems to be loosely based on circus legend P.T. Barnum.
43b	12b	"The Final Challenge"	November 25, 1978
Superman, Batman, Wonder Woman, Aquaman and Apache Chief — as well as their sinister adversaries — are sent to another universe to engage in a series of contests where the losers will be eliminated. The other Super Friends and Legion of Doom members search for their missing colleagues.
44a	13a	"Batman: Dead or Alive"	December 2, 1978
Batman and Robin head off to a planet named Texarkana after receiving a distress alert that a local villain, the Capricorn Kid, is terrorizing the planet. After defeating the Kid and putting him in jail, the Kid vows revenge on Batman and Robin. He and his group of outlaws travel to Earth, break into the Hall of Justice, and plot their revenge on all the Super Friends. The Kid's group successfully places each of the Super Friends in dangerous situations and they deliberately force Batman and Robin into freeing each person, but the catch is that each trap is timed and the object of the game is to free all the Super Friends from the various traps before it is too late. In a showdown, Batman and the Kid meet up in an old-fashioned shootout.
44b	13b	"Fairy Tale of Doom"	December 2, 1978
The Toyman develops a device that can project anyone into the pages of a storybook. He forces Hawkman to chase him into Jack and the Beanstalk, the Cheetah forces Wonder Woman to chase her into Alice in Wonderland and Brainiac forces Superman to chase him into Gulliver's Travels. The three villains trap the three Super Friends in the treacherous books, but when Batman, Robin, Green Lantern and Black Vulcan catch on, they trick Sinestro, Giganta and Captain Cold into helping them rescue their teammates by claiming that their fellow Legion of Doom members are still trapped inside the books.
45a	14a	"Battle of the Gods"	December 9, 1978
At the start of the episode, the Super Friends are involved in an intense outer space battle. Moments into the battle, Wonder Woman gets a telepathic message from Aphrodite to help save the planet from a disturbance. Afterwards, all of the Super Friends show up and Aphrodite praises them on their great work and good will. An envious Hera gets into an argument with Aphrodite on Mount Olympus, which triggers the wrath of Zeus. Hera criticizes Aphrodite for praising "mortals" such as the Super Friends and she suggests to Zeus that the Super Friends are not as powerful as Aphrodite claims. Zeus then creates a contest in which each of the Super Friends must do battle with mythological demons in an effort to prove they are worthy of Aphrodite's praise. Batman and Robin must battle a Sphinx and solve its riddle, Aquaman has to fight a demon that protects the Golden Fleece, Superman battles a Minotaur, and Wonder Woman has to battle Medusa. The Wonder Twins get mixed up in all of this when they see Medusa in the shadows and mistake her for Wonder Woman. Once they look into her eyes, they turn to stone. Gleek manages to escape Medusa's clutches and ends up aiding Wonder Woman in removing Medusa's necklace. By the episode's end, the Super Friends prove to be worthy of Zeus's praise. Wonder Woman realizes that she forgot about the Wonder Twins, but Zeus assures her that they are safe and have been returned to normal.
45b	14b	"Doomsday"	December 9, 1978
The Legion of Doom deserts Sinestro, Black Manta and Cheetah after a failed mission. The three villains decide to kill the Legion of Doom for their betrayal, until the Super Friends find out this is just a ploy to get them distracted.
46a	15a	"Journey Through Inner Space"	December 16, 1978
Aquaman is exposed to a radioactive substance that turns him into a prehistoric sea creature from which he evolved. In order to cure him, Superman and Wonder Woman, inside the Supermobile, are shrunk down to microscopic size and sent within the creature's veins to attempt to give it another dose of radiation in the hopes that it will reverse the effects of the radiation and return Aquaman to normal. In the meantime the rest of the Super Friends have to do whatever they can to limit the creature's destructive nature all over the city.
46b	15b	"Super Friends: Rest in Peace"	December 16, 1978
The Super Friends mourn the death of Batman (a.k.a. Bruce Wayne) and have gone into hiding after the Legion of Doom unearth a crystal called "Noxium", created by one-time member Dr. Natas. The crystal emulates the weaknesses of each member of the JLA such as kryptonite, Yellow Power and lethal energy. It can then kill all of the Super Friends. The Legion of Doom then plans to take over the world after they have disposed of the Super Friends and the crystal, only for it to be found and disposed of in deep space, allowing the Justice League to stop the Legion, who finds out too late they were in hiding and had really killed off their android clones.
47a	16a	"The Rise and Fall of the Super Friends"	December 23, 1978
The Super Friends are visited by Mister Mxyzptlk, who comes complete with a script for a movie that he wants the Super Friends to star in whether they want to or not. The imp uses his Fifth Dimensional magic to cause the Super Friends to act out the script, but Superman is not affected by it. He nonetheless goes along with everything in an elaborate plot to trick Mxyzptlk into saying his name backwards — by using his heat vision to change the last word on the script. Note: In one scene, a zombie Lois Lane shows up in a wedding dress wearing a kryptonite wedding ring.
47b	16b	"History of Doom"	December 23, 1978
The Earth is in ruins after an unexplained catastrophe occurs. Both the Super Friends and the Legion of Doom have been destroyed, as well as the human and animal population of Earth, rendering it dead. Three mystical individuals visit the now-ruined Hall of Justice and sees a recording from a weakened Superman, last survivor of the Super Friends, showing how the Legion of Doom won. After viewing a database containing information of how the members of the Legion of Doom originated and how they attempted to take over Earth, they later head to a ruined Hall of Doom. They also encounter a recording of an argument between each of the Legion's members. Grodd warns Luthor that even though they won, his latest plan also sealed their fate along with the Super Friends. The three extraterrestrials undo the destruction of Earth.

== Home media ==
Warner Home Video (via DC Entertainment, Hanna-Barbera Cartoons and Warner Bros. Family Entertainment) originally released this season of Super Friends on two separate DVDs on June 1, 2004, the first one being Challenge of the Superfriends: Attack of the Legion of Doom, which featured the "Challenge" segments, and the second being Challenge of the Superfriends: United They Stand, which featured the Superfriends segments. Both DVDs only featured four episodes. The first season with the Challenge episodes was re-released as Challenge of the Superfriends: The First Season on July 6, 2004. The second one with the Super Friends episodes was named Super Friends: Volume Two and was re-released on May 24, 2005.

Title	Type	Number of episodes	Release date
Challenge of the Superfriends	The First Season	16	July 6, 2004
Super Friends	Volume Two	16	May 24, 2005

== Spoofs ==
In 1998, Cartoon Network produced two commercials spoofing Challenge of the Superfriends:

- One dealt with the idiosyncratic nature of the Legion of Doom and Brainiac's odd manner of dress (Brainiac: "Look, I just want some pants...a decent pair of pants!" Solomon Grundy: "Solomon Grundy want pants, too!").
- The second, co-starring the Powerpuff Girls, dealt with Aquaman's powers (Aquaman: "My ability to talk to fish is of no use to us, Wonder Woman!") as well as the level of violence compared to today's cartoons, as Wonder Woman and Aquaman look away while the Powerpuff Girls beat up the Legion of Doom, going so far as to set the Scarecrow on fire. Most notably was Bubbles' double entendre reply to Wonder Woman's compliment on how they were developing as superheroes: "Someday we'll be as developed as you". Lex Luthor, since he was a villain, began laughing. His allies understood the joke and all of them laughed as well. When a piece of the Hall of Doom's ceiling fell on Luthor's head, everyone laughed.

In 2003, Cartoon Network Latin America aired the spoof series The Aquaman & Friends Action Hour that starred Aquaman as a children's television show host and the Legion of Doom as his bankrupt villains.

== Legends of the Superheroes ==
The two NBC televised live-action specials of Legends of the Superheroes produced by Hanna-Barbera Productions was based largely on Challenge of the Superfriends while featuring Adam West, Burt Ward, and Frank Gorshin of the 1966 Batman television series fame (West would go on to voice Batman in Super Friends: The Legendary Super Powers Show and The Super Powers Team: Galactic Guardians). The Justice League starred Batman, Robin, Captain Marvel, the Flash, Green Lantern, Hawkman, the Huntress, and the Black Canary against the Legion of Doom which featured Mordru leading Doctor Sivana, the Riddler, Giganta, Sinestro, the Weather Wizard, and Solomon Grundy (Superman, Wonder Woman, and their associate characters were absent due to the Superman film and Wonder Woman television series licensing the rights to them, respectively).

== DC Super Friends ==
Despite using the main theme from The World's Greatest SuperFriends, the 2010 DC Super Friends "The Joker's Playhouse" shares several elements of its opening sequence with Challenge of the Superfriends, including introducing the Legion of Doom.

== Robot Chicken DC Comics Special ==
The opening sequence of the Robot Chicken DC Comics Special parodies the opening of Challenge of the Superfriends with the Legion of Doom substituted for Robot Chicken original characters Chicken, Mad Scientist, Nerd, Humping Robot, Composite Santa, Gummy Bear, the Unicorn, and Bitch Puddin'. The Legion of Doom, Hall of Doom, and Hall of Justice also feature prominently in the episode.
