= Super Friends: The Legendary Super Powers Show =

- Genre: Adventure; Fantasy; Science fiction
- Created by: E. Nelson Bridwell; Carmine Infantino
- Based on: Justice League by: Gardner Fox
- Directed by: Oscar Dufau
- Creative director: Iwao Takamoto
- Voices of: Jack Angel; René Auberjonois; Michael Bell; William Callaway; Constance Cawlfield; Danny Dark; Fernando Escandon; Buster Jones; Stan Jones; Casey Kasem; Stanley Ralph Ross; Olan Soule; Mark L. Taylor; B. J. Ward; Frank Welker; Adam West
- Narrated by: William Woodson
- Music by: Hoyt Curtin
- Country of origin: United States
- Original language: English
- No. of episodes: 8 (16 segments) (list of episodes)

Production
- Executive producers: Joseph Barbera; William Hanna
- Producer: Kay Wright
- Editors: Michael Bradley; David Cowan; Mary Gleason; Jon Johnson; Carol Lewis; Catherine MacKenzie; Kerry Williams; Jerry Winicki; Cecil Broughton; Daniels Mclean; Terry Moore; Joe Sandusky; Giv Iverson
- Running time: 21 minutes (11 minutes per segment)
- Production companies: Hanna-Barbera Productions; DC Comics

Original release
- Network: ABC
- Release: September 8, 1984 – August 31, 1985

Related
- Super Friends (1973); The All-New Super Friends Hour; Challenge of the Superfriends; The World's Greatest SuperFriends; Super Friends (1980); The Super Powers Team: Galactic Guardians

Super Friends: The Legendary Super Powers Show is an American animated television series about a team of superheroes which ran from 1984 to 1985 on ABC. It was produced by Hanna-Barbera Productions and is based on the Justice League and associated comic book characters published by DC Comics.

== Format ==
Super Friends: The Legendary Super Powers Show was the first Super Friends series in a new format since 1979's The World's Greatest SuperFriends. Continuing the previous three years' policy of producing short stories, this series' format was two 11-minute stories per half-hour. Furthermore, the Wonder Twins were largely supplanted as audience identification figures by Firestorm, a well-established teenage superhero in the DC Comics universe, but they were paired with other Justice League members, as opposed to always teaming up with Wonder Woman or Batman and Robin. In "Case of The Shrinking Super Friends", they are teamed with Firestorm and Robin. In "Uncle Mxyzptlk", they work with Firestorm and Samurai. In "Village of The Lost Souls", they work with Wonder Woman and Apache Chief.

For the next season, the show was retitled The Super Powers Team: Galactic Guardians.

=== Toyline tie-in ===
Unlike the previous series, Super Friends: The Legendary Super Powers Show was produced to tie in with the Super Powers Collection toyline produced by Kenner, hence the name change. The general story, as detailed in the mini-comics that accompanied the figures, was that the major heroes of Earth had teamed up to fight Darkseid and his villains.

== Characters ==
=== Super Friends/Justice League of America ===
The Super Friends consist of 13 heroes:

- Superman
- Batman
- Robin
- Wonder Woman
- Green Lantern
- Firestorm
- Black Vulcan
- Gleek
- Apache Chief
- Samurai
- El Dorado
- Wonder Twins (Zan and Jayna)

According to DC writer/historian Mark Waid, Aquaman's sole appearance in The Legendary Super Powers Show is in the opening credits. The same is true for The Flash. This was the first time Wonder Woman was animated with the W symbol on her costume instead of the eagle design; this carried over into the final series, Galactic Guardians. Shannon Farnon was unable to reprise her voice work for Wonder Woman because the voice director Gorden Hunt auditioned and cast Connie Cawlfield in her place for the 1984 series. He was also noteworthy for using Adam West as the voice of Batman, two decades after the end of his live-action television series of Batman. West replaced Olan Soule and would continue through the subsequent Galactic Guardians series.

=== Villains ===
- Darkseid: Appearing outside of comics for the first time, Darkseid was still attempting to conquer Earth (often with help from other villains), but also had a secondary goal, of making Wonder Woman his bride. Darkseid brought a degree of seriousness to a show that had largely lacked it.
- Kalibak: His appearance was not as brutish as in later TV incarnations, more like the original Jack Kirby design for the character. He was almost always depicted as boastful, dull-witted, and ineffectual against the heroes.
- DeSaad: A master torturer and one of Darkseid's acolytes.
- Brainiac: The mechanical version of Brainiac appeared in the episodes "The Wrath of Brainiac" and "The Village of Lost Souls". In "The Wrath of Brainiac", Brainiac reveals that he shed his earlier appearance when he worked alongside Darkseid.
- Mirror Master appeared in an episode entitled "Reflections in Crime". Despite Mirror Master being a Flash villain, The Flash does not appear in this episode. In the episode, Mirror Master sets about trapping the Super Friends in this particular episode inside mirrors called the sixth dimension. The Super Friends managed to escape and trap Mirror Master in a House of Mirrors.
- Lex Luthor appeared in the opening and the episodes "No Honor Among Super Thieves" (in which acquires his power suit from the comics of then), "Case of the Shrinking Super Friends" and "The Mask of Mystery".
- Mister Mxyzptlk: In this series, Mxyzptlk's name is pronounced as Miks-ill-plik (backwards, Kilp-ill-skim) and he takes to tormenting all the members of the team, even when Superman is absent.
- The Robber Baron and Sleeves
- Dollmaker

For this series, Lex Luthor and Brainiac were revamped to resemble their comic book counterparts.

== Cast ==
- Jack Angel – Samurai
- René Auberjonois – DeSaad
- James Avery – Cromar (in "Darkseid's Golden Trap")
- Michael Bell – Zan, Gleek
- Gregg Berger – Benny the Bungler (in "Mr. Mxyzptlk and the Magic Lamp"), Ernie (in "Mr. Mxyzpltlk and the Magic Lamp)
- Arthur Burghardt – General Plankton (in "Mr. Mxyzptlk and the Magic Lamp")
- Howard Caine – Dr. Dan Corwin (in "Island of the Dinosoids"), King Timon (in "The Royal Ruse")
- Connie Cawlfield – Diana Prince / Wonder Woman
- Danny Dark – Kal-El/Clark Kent/Superman
- Fernando Escandon – El Dorado
- Pat Fraley – Captain Mystery/Sidney Wanamaker (in "Mask of Mystery"), Bank Guard (in "Mask of Mystery"), Remlar (in "The Curator")
- Liz Georges – Jayna, Little Superman (in "Uncle Mxyzptlk")
- Buster Jones – Black Vulcan
- Stan Jones – Lex Luthor, Robber Baron (in "Mask of Mystery"), Sleeves (in "Mask of Mystery")
- Casey Kasem – Dick Grayson / Robin
- Mary McDonald-Lewis – Lois Lane
- Mickey McGowan – Princess Tara (in "The Royal Ruse")
- Stanley Ralph Ross – Brainiac
- Michael Rye – Apache Chief, Hal Jordan/Green Lantern, Dan Corwin's Assistant (in "Island of the Dinosoids")
- Olan Soule – Martin Stein
- Mark L. Taylor – Ronnie Raymond/Firestorm
- Frank Welker – Uxas/Darkseid, Kalibak, Mister Mxyzptlk, Trucker (in "The Wrath of Brainiac"), Inspector Throckmorton (in "Mr. Mxyzptlk and the Magic Lamp"), Dollmaker (in "The Case of the Dreadful Dolls")
- Adam West – Bruce Wayne/Batman
- Bill Woodson – Narrator
- George DiCenzo (uncredited) - Mirror Master (in "Reflections in Crime"), Alien Auctioneer (in "Darkseid's Golden Trap")
- Dick Tufeld (uncredited) – Announcer

Note: Beginning with this version, Adam West replaced Olan Soule as the voice of Batman.

== Episodes ==
No. overall	No. in season	Title	Written by	Original release date
78	1	"The Bride of Darkseid"	Alan Burnett & Jeff Segal	September 8, 1984
Part I: Firestorm makes his debut as a superhero and is invited to join the Super Friends. Darkseid pursues Wonder Woman to be his and is able to capture her when Firestorm accidentally shuts off the Hall of Justice's force field. Part II: With her free will removed, Wonder Woman leads the Super Friends into a trap after they arrive at Darkseid's palace to save her. Firestorm's duo persona allows him to free himself and the Super Friends from Darkseid's clutches.
79a	2a	"The Wrath of Brainiac"	Glenn Leopold	September 15, 1984
Brainiac develops android duplicates of Superman and Wonder Woman in an attempt to seek revenge on the Super Friends. He enlists the reluctant help of Darkseid, who was tricked into following the android Wonder Woman into Brainiac's star-ship. Darkseid and Brainiac hatch a plan to capture all the Super Friends, but not long after their capture, it does not take long for the two egotistical villains to be at each other's throats. Darkseid and his gang whisk away with Wonder Woman through their stargate but it turns out to be the Wonder Woman android, and it is Brainiac who indirectly has the last laugh on Darkseid.
79b	2b	"Reflections in Crime"	John Bradford	September 15, 1984
Mirror Master traps Superman in the 6th dimension: the dimension behind mirrors. As he tries to warn him teammates through mirrors, he is too late as Batman and Robin are trapped as well. The Super Friends erroneously assume that they can only be trapped by mirrors and so Firestorm is caught by another highly reflective surface. The final Super Friend, Samurai uses invisibility to trick Mirror Master into thinking that he is caught. Samurai then grabs the portal device and releases his friends. Mirror Master is lost in a mirror maze and is caught.
80a	3a	"No Honor Among Thieves"	John Semper & Cynthia Friedlob	September 22, 1984
Lex Luthor disrupts Darkseid's quiet time on Apokolips with a plan to destroy the Super Friends by luring them to Darkseid's palace. Luthor plans on stealing the powers from the Super Friends using Darkseid's Omega Beams. Once Luthor has gained the powers of the Super Friends he quickly sets his sights on taking control of Darkseid's palace. The wily Darkseid, though, was prepared for a double-cross from Luthor. Suddenly, Luthor is powerless and the Super Friends are free, they regain their powers and they set out to stop Darkseid's latest plan. They thwart his plan but he escapes into his stargate. Afterward, Luthor is put in prison stripes.
80b	3b	"Mr. Mxyzptlk and the Magic Lamp"	John Bradford & John Bonaccorsi	September 22, 1984
A small-time thief named Benny finds an ancient lamp during a robbery. Batman and Apache Chief apprehend the crook, but observing from a distance is Mxyzptlk. He decides to get into the act by playing the part of a genie, who zaps the crook away and from that point forward the two go on a crime spree. Batman gets the last laugh on Mxyzptlk, though.
81a	4a	"The Case of the Shrinking Super Friends"	John Bates	September 29, 1984
Lex Luthor invents a shrinking ray and uses it on the Hall of Justice. The older members of the Justice League had earlier flown off to fight a mission in space, leaving behind the junior members like Robin, the Wonder Twins and Gleek, and Firestorm. Luthor succeeds in shrinking the Hall of Justice and it's up to the now miniature Super Friends to save the day before the senior members of the group return from space.
81b	4b	"The Mask of Mystery"	Glenn Leopold	September 29, 1984
Sidney Wanamaker, a classmate of Ronnie Raymond and fan of the Super Friends, creates his own secret identity called Captain Mystery. He taps into the Hall of Justice files and shows up to help the Super Friends but winds up causing more harm than good. Luthor notices this and kidnaps Captain Mystery and intends on using him in his plot. It's up to the Super Friends to rescue Captain Mystery and capture Lex Luthor.
82	5	"Darkseid's Golden Trap"	Alan Burnett & Jeff Segal	October 6, 1984
Part I: At an intergalactic auction, Darkseid and his crew set their eyes on gold kryptonite, which can permanently remove Superman's power. Black Vulcan, Wonder Woman, and Firestorm infiltrate the auction under disguise as ice creatures. They plan on bidding high and taking the kryptonite before it can fall into enemy hands, but Darkseid soon realizes their plan. Part II: Darkseid catches onto the trick and plots an elaborate scheme to expose Superman to the gold kryptonite that he won. El Dorado, Batman, and Superman travel to the Moon of Games to confront Kalibak about which star has Darkseid imprisoned Black Vulcan, Wonder Woman, and Firestorm. El Dorado hatches a plan with the help of Batman. Darkseid shows up unexpectedly, as El Dorado had feared, and Darkseid throws the gold kryptonite at Superman.
83a	6a	"The Island of the Dinosoids"	Marc Scott Zicree	October 13, 1984
While traveling to a science expo, Batman and Martin Stein crash-land on a tropical island and are attacked by dinosaurs. Ronnie Raymond, Apache Chief, Robin, and Wonder Woman arrive to rescue them and encounter scientist Dan Corwin, who transformed himself and a group of animals into dinosaurs using a "Geneto-Beam". His mind twisted by the transformation, he plans to use Stein's Omni-Caster to do so to the entire world until the heroes stop him and return him to normal.
83b	6b	"Uncle Mxyzptlk"	Kimmer Ringwald	October 13, 1984
The Wonder Twins accidentally expose Superman to Red Kryptonite, which turns him into a child. Subsequently, they, along with Samurai and Firestorm, are forced to babysit him as Mxyzptlk bothers them with his practical jokes and pranks.
84a	7a	"The Case of the Dreadful Dolls"	Rich Fogel	October 20, 1984
Dollmaker, uses clay dolls and voodoo black magic to command the real Super Friends to commit crimes. A few of the Super Friends do not fall victim and must rescue the others from Dollmaker's spell. Note: Originally, Toyman was to be the villain of the episode, but was replaced by original character Dollmaker due to being off-limits.
84b	7b	"The Royal Ruse"	Rich Fogel	October 20, 1984
Darkseid uses a royal princess from Tyron-7 to lure the Super Friends into a trap when they meet with her father King Timon. He promised her that if she delivered the Super Friends that her planet would be spared from his wrath. However, as things are more apt to do, the plan does not necessarily follow that path and soon the princess learns that she was a pawn in Darkseid's ultimate plot: to banish Tyron-7 into the negative universe. A projector turns the Super Friends to stone and it's up to the princess and her father to free them and stop Darkseid.
85a	8a	"The Village of Lost Souls"	Douglas Booth	October 27, 1984
Brainiac uses his star ship and his mental powers to take control of a small village. He turns people into zombie-like creatures who he enslaves to mine and work for him. Brainiac eventually takes control of the Wonder Twins who set out to capture Wonder Woman. This succeeds but would later backfire when Apache Chief grows 50 feet tall and rattles the Starship, which causes the ice block (Zan) around Wonder Woman to break. Freed, Wonder Woman destroys Brainiac's mind control machine which returns the Wonder Twins back to normal. Later on Apache Chief, the Wonder Twins, and Wonder Woman are on hand to stop Brainiac and save the village. Note: This episode is the final appearance of the Wonder Twins and Gleek.
85b	8b	"The Curator"	Glenn Leopold	October 27, 1984
Remlar, a villain from another galaxy, travels the universe in search of buildings and people to put on display in an intergalactic museum. Superman, Firestorm, and Samurai must figure out a way to stop Remlar and return the historical monuments and people to their rightful place. Note: This is the final episode to use the orange title card, and the final episode to use the original Hall of Justice and character designs.

== Home media ==
- On August 7, 2007, Warner Home Video (via DC Entertainment, Hanna-Barbera Productions and Warner Bros. Family Entertainment) released the complete series of Super Friends: The Legendary Super Powers Show on DVD, featuring all 16 episodes of the eighth Hanna-Barbera-produced Super Friends series on a 2-Disc DVD boxed set, uncut and unedited, presented in its original broadcast presentation and original airdate order.

DVD name	Ep No.	Release date
The Complete Series	16	August 7, 2007

== See also ==
- Super Powers Collection
