= List of Super Friends episodes =

Super Friends is an American animated series about a team of superheroes which ran from 1973 to 1985 on ABC. In the 1990s, the show was being shown on Cartoon Network and more recently its sister channel, Boomerang. It is based on the Justice League and associated comic book characters published by DC Comics.

Each episode was 44 minutes long. After the third season, it was reduced to 22 minutes and ever so often expanded cast of characters by featuring other JLA heroes joining the main five Super Friends (Superman, Wonder Woman, Aquaman, Batman, and Robin) on a semi-regular basis. The series episodes varied from single episode stand-alone stories to episodes with two, three, or even four segments. The varied incarnations of the group, from Super Friends (1973–1974) through The Super Powers Team: Galactic Guardians (1985), were considered by their creators to be one continuous canon. There were a total of 93 episodes, along with two episodes of The New Scooby-Doo Movies, with Batman and Robin appearing in "The Dynamic Scooby Doo Affair" and "The Caped Crusader Caper".

== Series overview ==
| Series | Season | Segments | Episodes | Originally released | |
| Series | Season | Segments | Episodes | First released | Last released |
|---|---|---|---|---|---|
| Super Friends (1973) | 1 | —N/a | 16 | September 8, 1973 | December 22, 1973 |
| The All-New Super Friends Hour | 1 | 60 | 15 | September 10, 1977 | December 10, 1977 |
| Challenge of the Superfriends | 1 | 32 | 16 | September 9, 1978 | December 23, 1978 |
| The World's Greatest SuperFriends | 1 | —N/a | 8 | September 22, 1979 | November 10, 1979 |
| Super Friends (1980) | 1 | 24 | 8 | September 13, 1980 | November 1, 1980 |
| Super Friends (1980) | 2 | 18 | 6 | September 26, 1981 | October 31, 1981 |
| Super Friends (1980) | 3 | 24 | 8 | September 10, 1983 | October 29, 1983 |
| Super Friends: The Legendary Super Powers Show | 1 | 16 | 8 | September 8, 1984 | October 27, 1984 |
| The Super Powers Team: Galactic Guardians | 1 | 10 | 8 | September 7, 1985 | October 26, 1985 |

== DVD releases ==
| DVD set | Release date |
| DVD set | Region 1 |
|---|---|
| Super Friends: Season One, Volume One | January 5, 2010 |
| Super Friends: Season One, Volume Two | July 20, 2010 |
| The All-New Super Friends Hour: Season 1, Volume 1 | January 8, 2008 |
| The All-New Super Friends Hour: Season 1, Volume 2 | January 27, 2009 |
| Challenge of the Super Friends: The First Season | July 6, 2004 |
| Super Friends: Volume Two | May 24, 2005 |
| The World's Greatest Super Friends: And Justice for All—The Complete Season Four | April 23, 2013 |
| Super Friends: A Dangerous Fate—The Complete Season Five | July 23, 2013 |
| Super Friends: Legacy of Super Powers—Complete Season Six | October 8, 2013 |
| Super Friends: The Lost Episodes | August 11, 2009 |
| Super Friends: The Legendary Super Powers Show—The Complete Series | August 7, 2007 |
| The Super Powers Team: Galactic Guardians—The Complete Series | October 23, 2007 |
