= Super Friends =

American animated television series about a team of superheroes (1973–1985)

- 1973–1974 season title card
- Genre: Superhero
- Based on: Justice League by Gardner Fox
- Voices of: Danny Dark; Olan Soule; Casey Kasem; Shannon Farnon; Norman Alden; Sherry Alberoni; Frank Welker; Ted Knight; Ted Cassidy
- Theme music composer: Hoyt Curtin; Will Schaefer
- Country of origin: United States
- Original language: English
- No. of seasons: 9
- No. of episodes: 93 (184 segments) (list of episodes)

Production
- Executive producers: Joseph Barbera; William Hanna
- Producers: Lewis Marshall; Iwao Takamoto
- Running time: Full episode: 45 minutes (seasons 1–3); 22 minutes (season 4); 21–23 minutes (seasons 5-7); 21 minutes (seasons 8–9); Each segment: 5–22 minutes (season 2); 20 minutes (season 3); 7 minutes (seasons 5-7); 11 minutes (seasons 8-9)
- Production companies: Hanna-Barbera Productions; DC Comics

Original release
- Network: ABC
- Release: September 8, 1973 – October 26, 1985

Related
- The New Scooby-Doo Movies; Harvey Birdman, Attorney at Law

Super Friends is an American animated television series about a team of superheroes which ran from 1973 to 1985 on ABC as part of its Saturday-morning cartoon lineup. It was produced by Hanna-Barbera and was based on the Justice League of America and associated comic book characters published by DC Comics. The title of the series varied from season to season, as did the superheroes on the team. Nine seasons, comprising a total of 93 episodes, were produced.

== Series titles ==
Over the years, the show existed under several titles:

- Super Friends (1973)
- The All-New Super Friends Hour (1977)
- Challenge of the Superfriends (1978)
- The World's Greatest SuperFriends (1979)
- Super Friends (1980–1983)
- Super Friends: The Legendary Super Powers Show (1984)
- The Super Powers Team: Galactic Guardians (1985)

Series	Season	Segments	Episodes	Originally released	
Series	Season	Segments	Episodes	First released	Last released
Super Friends (1973)	1	—N/a	16	September 8, 1973	December 22, 1973
The All-New Super Friends Hour	1	60	15	September 10, 1977	December 10, 1977
Challenge of the Superfriends	1	32	16	September 9, 1978	December 23, 1978
The World's Greatest SuperFriends	1	—N/a	8	September 22, 1979	November 10, 1979
Super Friends (1980)	1	24	8	September 13, 1980	November 1, 1980
Super Friends (1980)	2	18	6	September 26, 1981	October 31, 1981
Super Friends (1980)	3	24	8	September 10, 1983	October 29, 1983
Super Friends: The Legendary Super Powers Show	1	16	8	September 8, 1984	October 27, 1984
The Super Powers Team: Galactic Guardians	1	10	8	September 7, 1985	October 26, 1985

== Writing ==
Plotlines for the later series involved many of the familiar DC Comics super-villains, like the Joker and the Riddler, that the first incarnation of the Super Friends did not. Instead, like the comic books, they focused on the far-fetched schemes of mad scientists and aliens, who were invariably revealed as being well-intentioned, and simply pursuing their goals through unlawful or disreputable means. Typically, at the end of each story, a peaceful and reasonable discussion would be performed by the heroes to convince the antagonists to adopt more reasonable methods.

The All-New Super Friends Hour departed somewhat from the previous series' formula by featuring villains using more elaborate methods to further their goals; as a rule they could not be reasoned with, requiring the heroes to use direct force to stop them. Beginning with Challenge of the Superfriends, several of the heroes' arch-villains from the comic books (such as Lex Luthor and the Riddler) began to feature prominently in comic-style stories. Throughout the series, plots often wrapped themselves up neatly in the final minutes of an episode in the fashion of the typical comic books and deus ex machina.

== Production history ==
In 1973, animation company Hanna-Barbera acquired rights to the DC Comics characters and partnered with the American Broadcasting Company (ABC) to adapt the Justice League of America comic book for television. The network made several changes in the transition including the change of name to Super Friends to "cut off any accusations of extreme patriotism". Nevertheless, team members sometimes referred to themselves as the Justice League on the show. The violence common in superhero comics was toned down for a younger audience and to adhere to broadcast standards governing violence in 1970s children's television.

As a DC Comics-based show, the Super Friends franchise was owned by DC's parent company Warner Bros., who later put the series into syndication. Cartoon Network, which had the rights to air most of the rest of the Hanna-Barbera library from its inception in 1992, was not able to air Super Friends until after the merger of Warner Bros.' parent company, Time Warner and Cartoon Network's parent company, Turner Broadcasting System was completed in 1996. This merger also led to Warner Bros. taking control of Hanna-Barbera and all of its other assets as well. The series was owned by Hanna-Barbera Cartoons, DC Comics Entertainment, Warner Bros. Family Entertainment, and Warner Bros. Animation.

=== 1973–1974 series ===
Super Friends first aired on ABC on September 8, 1973, featuring well-known DC characters Superman, Batman and Robin, Wonder Woman, and Aquaman. Superman, Batman and Robin, and Aquaman had each previously appeared in their own animated series produced by Filmation, and voice talent from these prior programs was brought in to work on the new show (with the exception of Marvin Miller who was replaced by Norman Alden as the voice of Aquaman). Shortly before the Super Friends series was developed, Superman and Wonder Woman also guest-starred in two episodes of The Brady Kids (voiced by Lennie Weinrib and Jane Webb under Filmation), while Batman and Robin appeared in two episodes of The New Scooby-Doo Movies.

In addition to the superheroes, a trio of sidekicks was introduced, each of whom were new characters not drawn from the comic books: Wendy and Marvin (voiced by Sherry Alberoni and Frank Welker) and Wonder Dog (also voiced by Welker), none of whom had any special abilities (save the dog's unexplained ability to reason and talk). The trio—or at least its human members—were depicted as detectives and/or superheroes-in-training; the "teen detectives and their talking animal" cliché, originally popularized by Scooby-Doo, was typical in Hanna-Barbera cartoons of the 1970s.

Each episode began with the heroes responding to an emergency detected by the TroubAlert computer in the Hall of Justice, which served as the headquarters of the team. Colonel Wilcox (voiced by John Stephenson), a U.S. Army official, was a recurring character who would act as a government liaison with the Super Friends during emergencies. Conflicts were usually resolved with the antagonists persuaded to adapt more reasonable methods to achieve their aims (with the assistance of the heroes). Natural disasters triggered by human (or alien) activity were often shown, and environmental themes featured strongly in the program. Three other DC Comics superheroes were featured as guest stars during this season: Flash, Plastic Man, and Green Arrow; the latter two did not appear in any subsequent episodes of the series.

This first run of Super Friends, consisting of 16 one-hour episodes which were rerun several times, concluded on August 24, 1974. At this point, the series was cancelled, but interest in superheroes among ABC's prime-time viewers (with the success of The Six Million Dollar Man and the live-action Wonder Woman series) caused the network to revive Super Friends. The original 16 episodes of the series were rebroadcast as a mid-season replacement, running from February 7, 1976, to September 3, 1977. These episodes were edited into half-hour versions. At the same time, DC Comics published a Super Friends comic, which used Wendy and Marvin from issue #1 (November 1976) to #6 (August 1977). In the meantime, Hanna-Barbera began production on a revamped version of the show.

=== 1977–1978 season: The All-New Super Friends Hour ===
The All-New Super Friends Hour featured four animated shorts per program. Wendy, Marvin, and Wonder Dog were dropped from this and all future TV iterations of Super Friends, and were replaced by Wonder Twins Zan and Jayna, and their pet monkey, Gleek. Unlike Wendy and Marvin, Zan and Jayna had super powers. A total of 15 episodes were produced. Darrell McNeil of the Hanna-Barbera animation studios later explained the change in cast:

When the decision was made by ABC to renew Super Friends three years after the first series' 1973 production, ABC and Hanna-Barbera wanted to ramp up (as much as they could) the series' action content. And since we were ramping that up, that meant making all of our cast a bit more serious, and giving our five leads a bit more backup than three non-powered sidekicks. [New sidekicks] also helped emphasize the 'New' in All-New Super Friends. [emphasis in original]

The show followed a basic format each week. The first segment of every show featured two of the heroes teaming up in a separate mini-story. The second segment featured a story with the Wonder Twins. The third segment was considered the primary adventure of the week, featuring the entire Super Friends roster (including the Wonder Twins) in a longer adventure. The fourth and final segment featured a story with one of the primary lineup and a "special guest star". This segment typically featured a problem that was solved using the guest star's unique abilities. The character of Apache Chief first appeared as a guest star in this series.

Between segments there were short spots with members of the Super Friends giving basic safety lessons, providing first-aid advice, demonstrating magic tricks, creating crafts, and presenting a two-part riddle featuring the week's primary plot line. This was the first season to feature two villains appearing in the comic books, Black Manta and Gentleman Ghost. Each appeared in only one episode this season and each was somewhat modified for television.

=== 1978–1979 season Super Friends / Challenge of the Superfriends ===
The next season of Super Friends featured two segments:

==== First segment: Super Friends episodes ====
The first segment of the program featured the established group of heroes: Superman, Batman and Robin, Aquaman, Wonder Woman, and the Wonder Twins and Gleek. These segments were rerun with the intro from the All-New Super Friends Hour when in syndication in the early 1980s, but have seldom been seen in syndication since then.

==== Second segment: Challenge of the Superfriends ====
The second half-hour of the show introduced the Legion of Doom, a team of 13 recurring foes who are the Super Friends' worst enemies. They used a swamp-based mechanical flying headquarters, the Hall of Doom, as a contrast to the Super Friends' gleaming Hall of Justice. A total of 16 episodes were produced.

Additional heroes who had previously appeared as guest stars were added to the roster as well, to make a total of 12. These included The Flash, Green Lantern, and Hawkman from DC Comics and three Hanna-Barbera creations to reflect diversity: Black Vulcan, Apache Chief, and Samurai.

The Challenge of the Superfriends segment was expanded to 90 minutes mid-season, with reruns of earlier episodes filling out the last half-hour.

=== 1979–1980 season: The World's Greatest SuperFriends ===
In the fall of 1979, the Super Friends returned to their prior format, bringing back the original set of five DC superheroes and Zan, Jayna, and Gleek. Eight half-hour episodes were created for this run, with the majority of the season consisting of rebroadcasts of The All-New Super Friends Hour from 1977 to 1978 and The Super Friends segments from Challenge of the Superfriends from 1978 to 1979. Renamed The World's Greatest SuperFriends, this series began on September 22, 1979, and ran until September 27, 1980.

=== 1980–1982 seasons: SuperFriends ===
Renamed SuperFriends in 1980, the series changed formats again, abandoning the production of half-hour episodes and producing seven-minute shorts. Each episode of SuperFriends would feature a rerun from one of the previous six years and three new shorts. These new adventures featured appearances by the core group of five Super Friends and Zan, Jayna, and Gleek. There were also guest appearances from members previously depicted in Challenge of the Superfriends and the Hanna-Barbera-created hero El Dorado, who was added to the show in 1981 to provide additional cultural diversity.

This would prove to be one of the longer-lived incarnations of the series (three years). A total of 22 episodes were produced.

=== 1982–1983 season: The Best of the Super Friends (reruns) ===
For the 1982–1983 television season ABC ran half-hour reruns of shows from the previous seven seasons, with none of the seven-minute shorts rebroadcast. ABC called the rerun package The Best of the Super Friends.

=== 1983–1984 season: Australian "lost episodes" ===
Hanna-Barbera and Warner Bros. had created a syndication package of the earlier Super Friends series (co-distributed by LBS Communications); these were picked up by stations across the United States and typically broadcast on weekday afternoons. Not wishing to compete with the syndication programming, ABC dropped the series from the 1983–1984 Saturday morning television line-up but continued to fund the production of new episodes. In total, 24 "lost episodes" were produced, and were intended to only be broadcast in Australia. Three of these episodes received American airings when Super Friends returned to Saturday-morning ABC television the following year. The remainder aired on the USA Network in 1995, as part of the Superman/Batman Adventures show. The 1983 Lost Episodes of Super Friends were released on DVD by Warner Home Entertainment (via DC Comics Entertainment, Hanna-Barbera Cartoons, and Warner Bros. Family Entertainment) in April 2009.

=== 1984–1985 season: Super Friends: The Legendary Super Powers Show ===
Super Friends returned to ABC Saturday, September 8, 1984, with a new 30-minute program typically featuring two 11-minute stories per episode. This incarnation featured Superman, Batman, Robin, Wonder Woman, and the Wonder Twins and Gleek, this time teamed up with Firestorm. In addition to this core group, episodes during this season also featured cameos by old (and new) Super Friends. The series ended August 31, 1985, and featured comic-book villains such as Brainiac, Lex Luthor, Mirror Master, Mr. Mxyzptlk, Darkseid, and his henchmen from Apokolips. This title of this season and the next featured the phrase "Super Powers" to tie in with a toy line produced by Kenner.

=== 1985 season: The Super Powers Team: Galactic Guardians ===
In the fall of 1985, the next version of Hanna-Barbera's depiction of the DC Comics heroes began, although it no longer carried the Super Friends name. This series returned to a conventional lineup for the team, with a focus on teen members Cyborg and Firestorm. Once again headquartered at the Hall of Justice in Metropolis, the heroes battled such familiar foes as Lex Luthor, Brainiac, the Scarecrow, and recurring villain Darkseid. It also contained the only appearances in the series by Joker, Penguin, the Royal Flush Gang, and Felix Faust.

Notably, it is in this series that Batman's origin is depicted for the first time outside of comics.

The Super Powers Team: Galactic Guardians lasted one season before being canceled. The final new episode aired was "Escape from Space City" on October 26, 1985. This third cancellation would be the final one, and Galactic Guardians marked the end of Super Friends.

== Characters ==
=== The Justice League of America ===
The core group of heroes made up the "Super Friends":

- Aquaman (1973–1985)
- Batman (1973–1985)
- Robin (1973–1985)
- Superman (1973–1985)
- Wonder Woman (1973–1985)
- Firestorm (1984–1985)
- Cyborg (1985)

Other members and guest stars:

- The Flash (1973; 1977–1985)
- Plastic Man (1973)
- Green Arrow (1973)
- Atom (1977; 1980–1983)
- Green Lantern (1977–1985)
- Hawkgirl (1977; 1980; 1983)
- Hawkman (1977–1978; 1980–1985)
- Rima the Jungle Girl (1977; 1980)
- Apache Chief (1977–1978; 1980–1984)
- Black Vulcan (1977–1978; 1980–1984)
- Samurai (1977–1978; 1980–1985)
- Abin Sur (1978)
- Superboy (1978; 1983)
- El Dorado (1982–1985)

Junior Super Friends:

- Wendy, Marvin and Wonder Dog (1973–1975)
- Wonder Twins and Gleek (1977–1984)

Supporting characters originally from DC comic books:

- Commissioner James Gordon
- Hippolyta
- Lois Lane
- Jimmy Olsen
- Alfred Pennyworth
- Perry White
- Solovar
- Steve Trevor

=== Legion of Doom ===
Thirteen villains composed the Legion of Doom during the Challenge of the Superfriends season:

- Bizarro
- Black Manta
- Brainiac
- Captain Cold
- Cheetah
- Giganta
- Gorilla Grodd
- Solomon Grundy
- Lex Luthor
- Riddler
- Scarecrow
- Sinestro
- Toyman

=== Other villains ===
Villains appearing independently from the Legion of Doom:

- From Apokolips:
  - Darkseid
  - DeSaad
  - Kalibak
  - Paradrones
- Bizarro's Clones:
  - Bizarro version of Cyborg
  - Bizarro Firestorm
  - Bizarro Wonder Woman
  - Mr. Kltpzyxm
  - Alfred Bizarro

- Felix Faust
- Gentleman Ghost
- Joker
- Mirror Master
- Mr. Mxyzptlk
- Penguin
- Royal Flush Gang

=== Original villains ===
- The Alien Mummy
- The Anti-Matter Monster
- Barko
- Bigfoot creatures
- Blackbeard
- Bulgor the Behemoth
- The Brain Creatures
- The Capricorn Kid
- Captain Shark
- The Collector
- The Incredible Crude Oil Monster
- Darkon
- Dictor and the mysterious Time Creatures
- The Dollmaker
- Dracula
- Dr. Cranum
- Dr. Droid
- Dr. Frankenstein
- Dr. Fright
- Dr. Gulliver
- The Earthors
- The Enforcer
- Giant Snow Creature
- The Highway Angels
- The Hydronoids
- The Ice Demon
- Insecta and the Arthropods
- The Iron Cyclops
- John Palette
- The Junk Creature from the Dump
- Kareem Azaar
- Keelhaul Kelly
- King Arthur (Arthur 7)
- The Lion Men
- The Make Up Monster
- Mal Havok
- The Man Beasts Of Xra
- The Marsh Monster
- Medula and her Mind Maidens
- Mongor
- The Mummy Of Nazca
- The Mysterious Mutants of the Space Sphere
- Nartan
- Ocina and the Ancient Atlantean Warriors
- Old Man Holmes
- Orville Gump
- The Outlaws of Orion (Pack and Stardust)
- The Phantom Zone Villains (Hul, Logar, Rom-Lok)
- The Plant Creatures
- Professor Amy Zhan
- Professor Fearo
- Professor Korloff
- The Power Pirate
- The Robber Baron and Sleeves
- The Rock and Roll Space Bandits
- Rock Batman
- Rokan
- R.O.M.A.C.
- The Secret Four
- Scorpio
- Sculpin
- Sinbad and the Space Pirates
- Solderath and the Lava Men
- The Space Dolls
- The Evil Space Genie
- The Space Racers
- The Star Energy Creature
- The Super Enemies
- The Termites from Venus
- Torhana
- Tyrannic
- Vampiress, the Voodoo Vampire
- Yuna the Terrible
- Zarnum
- Zi-Kree
- The Zoons

=== DC characters who only appeared in Super Friends comics ===
- Batgirl
- Black Canary
- Black Orchid
- Chronos
- Elongated Man
- Etrigan the Demon
- Global Guardians (Doctor Mist, Green Fury, Icemaiden, Jack O'Lantern, Little Mermaid, Seraph, Tasmanian Devil)
- Hector Hammond
- Huntress
- Man-Bat
- Red Tornado
- Supergirl
- Swamp Thing

== References to the Justice League of America name ==
Beginning with the original Super Friends season, the opening narration describes the team's headquarters as "the great hall of the Justice League". The opening credits of Challenge of the Superfriends names the Super Friends as the Justice League of America. In addition to the appearance of a JLA emblem on a communicator and a reference to a mission to repair the Justice League satellite, the Super Friends are often linked with the JLA. The Justice League satellite is the same design as the Justice League Satellite that appeared in the comics at the time, but is smaller than its comic book counterpart.

== Reception ==
In January 2009, IGN listed Super Friends as the 50th best animated television series.

== Home video releases ==
Season	Episodes	Season premiere	Season finale	DVD title/volume	DVD release date and ASIN		
Season	Episodes	Season premiere	Season finale	DVD title/volume	Region 1	Region 2	ASIN Number
1	16	September 8, 1973	August 24, 1974	Super Friends - Season 1: Volume 1 Super Friends - Season 1: Volume 2	January 5, 2010; July 20, 2010		B002S3Y1LQ; B003F3NE4S
2	15	September 10, 1977	September 2, 1978	Super Friends - Season 2: The All-New Super Friends Hour, Volume 1 Super Friends - Season 2: The All-New Super Friends Hour, Volume 2	January 8, 2008; January 27, 2009		B000W2C28Y; B001HRS8HW
3	16	September 9, 1978	September 3, 1979	Super Friends - Season 3: Challenge of the Superfriends, The First Season; Super Friends - Season 3, Volume 2	July 6, 2004; May 24, 2005		B00023E88U; B0007XFZMS
4	8	September 22, 1979	September 27, 1980	Super Friends - Season 4: The World's Greatest Super Friends, The Complete Series	April 23, 2013		B00CREAO9O
5	24	September 13, 1980	September 1, 1981	Super Friends - Season 5: A Dangerous Fate, The Complete Series	July 23, 2013		B00CM0DIT6
6	18	September 26, 1981	October 31, 1982	Super Friends - Season 6: Super Friends! Legacy Of Super Powers, The Complete Season Six (6 on DVD label)	October 8, 2013		B00DVKKWFE
7	8	September 10, 1983	September 8, 1984	Super Friends - Season 7: Super Friends The Lost Episodes	August 11, 2009		B0027WNRV8
8	16	September 8, 1984	August 31, 1985	Super Friends - Season 8: The Legendary Super Powers Show, The Complete Series	August 7, 2007		B000PC8AKK
9	10	September 11, 1985	November 6, 1986	Super Friends - Season 9: The Super Powers Team: Galactic Guardians, The Complete Series	October 23, 2007		B000TSTEJG

== Spin-offs ==
=== Legends of the Superheroes ===
On January 18 and 25, 1979, Hanna-Barbera ran two one-hour live-action specials under the umbrella title Legends of the Superheroes. The first special, "The Challenge", was loosely based on the Super Friends and the 1960s Batman series and included several other DC characters who replaced Samurai, Black Vulcan, and Apache Chief: Black Canary, Huntress, and Captain Marvel. The second special, "The Roast", featured Ed McMahon as emcee of the roast, along the lines of The Dean Martin Celebrity Roast specials. Due to Warner Bros.' contracts on Wonder Woman and Superman, the characters were unable to be featured on the specials.

=== The Plastic Man Comedy Adventure Show ===
Plastic Man appeared in the first season of Super Friends, in one episode. Later, Ruby-Spears Productions released a series starring the character in his own solo adventures.

=== Batman ===
A Batman animated series was also considered in the mid-1980s, presumably with Adam West reprising his role as the voice of Batman. "The Fear" was written as a pilot episode for the series, but was instead adapted into an episode of The Super Powers Team: Galactic Guardians.

=== The New Teen Titans ===
In 1983, a cartoon based upon The New Teen Titans comics began development. It was created as a companion for the Super Friends, to be set in the same continuity. Robin was not going to be featured in the cartoon though, at least not as a regular, since in the Super Friends universe, he was a member of the Justice League. Like Super Friends, the show was to be developed by Hanna-Barbera for ABC, but since shows like The Smurfs (airing on NBC) were so popular at the time, this show was never picked up by the network. The show would have featured Wonder Girl as the leader, along with Cyborg, Kid Flash, Changeling, Raven, and Starfire. Although the show failed to get picked up, a television commercial with a substance abuse theme did feature the Titans, as they would have appeared in the animated series, along with a new superhero named the Protector who would have been the replacement character for Robin. A Teen Titans animated TV program was eventually produced, adding Robin and removing Wonder Girl, Kid Flash and Protector.

=== DC Super Friends ===
Fisher-Price developed a toy line named DC Super Friends featuring DC Comics characters as toys for young children. A comic book series and direct-to-video original animation called The Joker's Playhouse (2010) was developed to tie-in. The video features the World's Greatest Super Friends theme, allusions to the Legion of Doom, and the Super Friends and their Hall of Justice.

== Comic books ==
=== Super Friends ===
The first use of the Super Friends name on a DC Comics publication was in Limited Collectors' Edition #C-41 (December 1975-January 1976) which reprinted stories from Justice League of America #36 and 61 and featured a new framing sequence by writer E. Nelson Bridwell and artist Alex Toth. DC published a comic book version of the Super Friends from November 1976 to August 1981. The comic book series was launched by Bridwell and artist Ric Estrada. Zan and Jayna were given back stories and secret identities as a pair of blond-haired high school kids; they were more competent heroes than their animated counterparts.

While the television cartoons were not part of the same fictional universe as the DC comic books, Bridwell made the comic book accord with the other DC titles via footnotes.

In 2008, DC began publishing a new Super Friends comic book starring Superman, Batman, Wonder Woman, Aquaman, Flash (Wally West) and Green Lantern (John Stewart). Based on the eponymous Imaginext toyline, it is aimed at children (being part of the Johnny DC imprint), with an art style reminiscent to that of Marvel's Super Hero Squad. Written by Sholly Fisch with art mainly from Dario Brizuela, Stewart McKenny and J. Bone (who was cover artist throughout the series), it ran for 29 issues, from May 2008 to September 2010.

=== Collected Editions ===
- Super Friends: For Justice! (collects #1-7)
- Super Friends: Calling All Super Friends (collects #8-14)
- Super Friends: Head of the Class (collects #15-21)
- Super Friends: Mystery In Space (collects #22-28)
- DC Goes Ape (576 pages, October 2008, ISBN 978-1401219352) collects #30
- DC Through the 80s: The End of Eras (520 pages, December 2020, ISBN 978-1779500878) collects #36
- Super Friends: Saturday Morning Comics
  - Volume 1 (520 pages, June 2020, ISBN 978-1401295424) collects #1-26, Aquateers Meet the Super Friends, and the Super Friends stories from Limited Collectors' Edition C-41 and C-46
  - Volume 2 (488 pages, December 2020, ISBN 978-1779505927) collects #27-47

=== Extreme Justice ===
In the comics, the Wonder Twins were members of the short-lived JLI offshoot Extreme Justice.

=== Young Justice ===
Young Justice follows the adventures of a group composed of teenage heroes Robin, Superboy, Impulse, and Wonder Girl. Towards the end of the run, Young Justice was involved in a mission which required them to invade an island whose population was made up of super-villains. The core team recruits various other teenage heroes, including the Wonder Twins, to attack the island.

=== Super Buddies ===
The lighthearted nature of Super Friends was spoofed in the 2000s with two DC miniseries, Formerly Known as the Justice League and I Can't Believe It's Not the Justice League!. In these miniseries the group is known as the "Super Buddies", and consists of a team of ex-Justice League members. A television advertisement for the team shows them posing in the postures of the original Super Friends title card.

=== Teen Titans ===
In Teen Titans #34 (2006), Wendy and Marvin are introduced into the mainline DC continuity. They are depicted as fraternal twins, and are employed at Titans Tower as maintenance crew and mechanical troubleshooters. Wonder Dog was also introduced into the series, depicted as a demon who was sent to Titans Tower to kill the team. Wonder Dog kills Marvin and cripples Wendy, leaving her paraplegic. Wendy is a supporting character in the Batgirl series, where she receives help accepting her disabilities from former Batgirl Barbara Gordon.

=== Justice League of America ===
During the events of the 2005 company-wide Infinite Crisis crossover the Justice League Watchtower was destroyed by Superboy-Prime, leaving the JLA without a base of operations. To that end, the team established the Hall of Justice in Washington, D.C. to act as an embassy for the team and an emergency base of operations if needed. In the continuity of the comics, the Hall was designed by Green Lantern and Wonder Woman. In Justice League of America #46 (2010) Samurai made his first appearance in the DC Universe, where he was shown as one of the heroes driven temporarily insane by Alan Scott's power.

=== Wizard magazine ===
Issue #77 of Wizard magazine parodied the Super Friends; the JLA was sent through a dimensional rift and met some of the Super Friends. After Martian Manhunter used his Martian vision to melt the villain and his machine, the Super Friends decided to send the Justice Leaguers back to their own dimension. As a jest, the magazine also ran an April Fool's promotion for a Wonder Twins special by Alex Ross. The book, entitled Wonder Twins: Form of Water, was to be one of Ross' oversized books chronicling the Justice League. The plot would see Zan and Jayna using their powers for charity efforts after Gleek contracts rabies from severe dehydration.

=== Superman and Batman: World's Funnest ===
In the Elseworlds one-shot Superman and Batman: World's Funnest, Bat-Mite and Mr. Mxyzptlk travel to different worlds within the DC Universe. On one of them, they encounter the Super Friends.

== In other media ==
=== Justice League Unlimited ===
The Ultimen, loosely based on characters created for the Super Friends, appear in the Justice League Unlimited episode "Ultimatum", as allies and later antagonists to the League. The Ultimen consisted of Long Shadow (based on Apache Chief), Juice (based on Black Vulcan), Wind Dragon (based on Samurai), and Downpour and Shifter (based on the Wonder Twins). They are a group of superheroes created by Project Cadmus to be loyal to the government, with Maxwell Lord as their manager. Additionally, they are genetically unstable and have short lifespans, being continuously cloned and implanted with false memories.

=== Smallville ===
The Wonder Twins appear in the Smallville episode "Idol", with Zan portrayed by David Gallagher and Jayna by Allison Scagliotti.

=== Young Justice ===
The Hall of Justice appears in Young Justice as a decoy base that hides the existence of the Watchtower. Additionally, Wendy and Marvin appear as classmates of Conner Kent and Megan Morse.

In the second season, approximations of the minority members created for Super Friends are introduced as teenagers who had their metahuman abilities activated by the Reach. The group consists of Tye Longshadow (Apache Chief), Asami Koizumi (Samurai), and Eduardo "Ed" Dorado Jr. (El Dorado). The exception is Black Vulcan, whose place is taken by Static.

=== Teen Titans Go! ===
The Wonder Twins appear in the Teen Titans Go! episode "You're Fired!", where they apply to replace Beast Boy after he is fired from the Teen Titans.

=== The Lego Batman Movie ===
In The Lego Batman Movie, the cast of the Super Friends are seen celebrating an anniversary party in the Fortress of Solitude, which Batman was not invited to, featuring characters like El Dorado, the Wonder Twins, Gleek, and Wonder Dog.

=== Teen Titans Go! & DC Super Hero Girls: Mayhem in the Multiverse ===
The Super Friends make a minor appearance in Teen Titans Go! & DC Super Hero Girls: Mayhem in the Multiverse, consisting of Superman, Batman, Robin (Dick Grayson), Wonder Woman, and Aquaman.

=== Tomorrowverse ===
The All-New Super Friends Hour incarnation of the Super Friends make a cameo appearance in Justice League: Crisis on Infinite Earths, consisting of Superman, Batman, Robin (Dick Grayson), Wonder Woman, Aquaman, and the Wonder Twins.

=== Injustice: Gods Among Us ===
The Hall of Justice appears as a stage in Injustice: Gods Among Us.

=== Lego Batman 3: Beyond Gotham ===
The Hall of Justice and the Hall of Doom appear as stages in Lego Batman 3: Beyond Gotham.

== Merchandise ==
=== Super Powers Collection ===
The Super Powers toy line (and associated tie-in merchandise) was based on the final two seasons of Super Friends. Samurai, an original character from the show, and the Hall of Justice were both released. Plans for future waves from Super Powers would have also included Apache Chief, El Dorado, Black Vulcan and the Wonder Twins.

=== Justice League Unlimited ===
The toy line based on Justice League Unlimited released a three pack of figures from characters created for Super Friends, namely Black Vulcan, Apache Chief and Samurai. They were chosen over the Ultimen characters that actually appeared in the JLU animated series: Juice, Long Shadow, and Wind Dragon.

=== DC Super Friends ===
Fisher-Price began to produce DC Comics characters in a kid-friendly toyline named after the Super Friends.

=== DC Universe Classics ===
Paying homage to Super Powers, DC Universe Classics produced original Super Friends characters such as Apache Chief, Black Vulcan, El Dorado, Samurai and the Wonder Twins.
