= El Dorado (Super Friends) =

DC Comics character

Publication information
- First appearance: Super Friends (Season 5) "Alien Mummy"
- Created by: Hanna-Barbera

In-story information
- Species: Metahuman
- Place of origin: Mexico City, Mexico
- Team affiliations: Super Friends; Justice League
- Partnerships: Apache Chief; Samurai; Black Vulcan
- Abilities: Illusion casting; Optic force blasts; Superhuman strength; Teleportation; Telepathy

El Dorado is a Mexican superhero featured in various incarnations of the Super Friends animated television series voiced by Mexican actor Fernando Escandon.

A variation of El Dorado appears in the animated series Young Justice, voiced by Freddy Rodriguez.

== Fictional character biography ==
El Dorado was created solely for the Hanna-Barbera's Super Friends cartoons, although his appearances were relatively rare except in the last two short-lived series of the superhero saga, and did not appear officially in the main DC Universe until 2017.

He first appeared as minor character in the Super Friends animated shorts, which aired in 1981 season and later in Super Friends: The Legendary Super Powers Show (1984-1985) as a full-time member. In the final version of animated Super Friends, The Super Powers Team: Galactic Guardians (1985), El Dorado was one of the few surviving members to appear.

El Dorado spoke English with a Spanish accent, and used both English and Spanish words in full sentences. Although his name is inspired by a mythical pre-Hispanic city of gold in South America called El Dorado, this character was inexplicably presented as Aztec or Mexican, dressed in a suit reminiscent of typical Mexican wrestling attire, but without a mask.

In El Dorado's debut episode "Alien Mummy", it is revealed that he is of Mexican descent. The narrator sets the scene by describing the location as "ancient Aztec ruins in the Mexican wilderness". One of El Dorado's lines is "these are the mysterious ruins of my people." In this episode, El Dorado also grows into a larger version of himself, although not on the gigantic scale of his Super Friends colleague Apache Chief.

In the Prime Earth continuity, El Dorado first appeared as part of the New 52 DC Universe in Suicide Squad Most Wanted: El Diablo and Amanda Waller #5 by Jai Nitz and Cliff Richards.

El Dorado makes an appearance in issue #1 of The Wonder Twins comic book released by DC Comics in February 2019. He is seen on the top panel of page 9 walking in the Hall of Justice.

He makes an appearance in Doomsday Clock, the follow-up series to Watchmen as a member of Mexico's super team, ¡Justicia!.

== Powers and abilities ==
El Dorado's powers were not well-defined and were highly ambiguous. His most frequently used ability was teleportation, which he accomplished by wrapping his cape over his body and vanishing. Anyone or anything he wrapped his cape around could also be teleported with him, and there appeared to be no limit to the distance he could travel. Another of his frequently used powers was the ability to generate illusions. Defined as "holograms", these illusions were also capable of fooling other senses, as they sometimes generated noise and could be touched; he once created a sea monster which roared loudly, and on another occasion generated a pile of fake dolls a villain was forced to dig through physically.

He also exhibited some degree of mental powers, including telepathy seen in Super Friends season 6 episode where he communicates with Wonder Woman. During the series' opening theme, he is at one point shown to be hovering, suggesting flight capabilities, and he would sometimes enter from the side of the screen as if he were just landing.

El Dorado possesses superhuman strength, allowing him to lift heavy objects with little effort. Knowledgeable about Pre-Columbian history (yet vague in his explanations), he assisted the Super Friends whenever they were forced to enter unfamiliar ruins or areas in Latin America. No official origin was ever given to explain El Dorado's past, nor the method through which he had acquired these powers. They may be mystical in nature and he is empowered by ancient magic and his people's warrior-spirit, possibly derived from ancestral "ancient Aztec sorcerers". Another possibility is that his powers are purely psionic, and the Aztec elements are incorporated purely for thematic purposes. In the last episodes in which he participated, he is seen with the ability to shoot laser beams from his eyes.

== In other media ==
=== Television ===
A character based on El Dorado named Ed Dorado Jr. appears in Young Justice, voiced by Freddy Rodriguez. This version is a metahuman with the ability to teleport. Ed Jr.'s father Ed Dorado Sr., a scientist who works with Zeta Beam teleportation technology, surmises his son's powers originated "opportunistically" as a consequence of his work and Ed Jr.'s past attempts at running away to see him. In the third season, the Dorados become counselors at the Metahuman Youth Center, with Ed Jr. joining the Outsiders as El Dorado to inspire the center's patients.

=== Film ===
- El Dorado makes a cameo appearance in Scooby-Doo! Mask of the Blue Falcon.
- El Dorado makes a cameo appearance in The Lego Batman Movie.

=== Merchandise ===
- El Dorado was scheduled to receive an action figure in the Super Powers Collection line, but the line was canceled before his figure could be made.
- El Dorado received a figure in Series 18 of Mattel's DC Universe Classics line.
- El Dorado received an 8-inch figure by Figures Toy Company.
- El Dorado received a figure in the "Justice League Anniversary Party" Lego set.
