= The All-New Super Friends Hour =

1977–78 animated television series

- Genre: Adventure; Fantasy; Science fiction
- Created by: E. Nelson Bridwell; Carmine Infantino; Julius Schwartz (consultants)
- Based on: Justice League by: Gardner Fox
- Developed by: Gil Kane
- Written by: Dick Conway; Willie Gilbert; Orville H. Hampton; Elana Lesser; Duane Poole; Dick Robbins; Cliff Ruby; John Strong; Jeffrey Scott; Mark Jones; Robert Kanigher
- Directed by: Charles A. Nichols
- Creative director: Iwao Takamoto
- Starring: Norman Alden; Michael Bell; Danny Dark; Olan Soule; Casey Kasem; Shannon Farnon; Buster Jones; Louise "Liberty" Williams
- Narrated by: William Woodson
- Opening theme: Hoyt Curtin
- Country of origin: United States
- Original language: English
- No. of seasons: 1
- No. of episodes: 15 (60 segments)

Production
- Executive producers: William Hanna; Joseph Barbera
- Camera setup: George Epperson; Jerry Whittington; Chuck Flekal; Curt Hall; Ron Jackso; Jerry Smith
- Running time: 45 minutes (5–22 minutes per segment)
- Production companies: Hanna-Barbera Productions; DC Comics

Original release
- Network: ABC
- Release: September 10, 1977 – September 2, 1978

Related
- Super Friends (1973); Challenge of the Superfriends; The World's Greatest SuperFriends; Super Friends (1980); Super Friends: The Legendary Super Powers Show; The Super Powers Team: Galactic Guardians

The All-New Super Friends Hour is an American animated television series about a team of superheroes which ran from September 10, 1977, to September 2, 1978, on ABC. It was produced by Hanna-Barbera Productions and is based on the Justice League and associated comic book characters published by DC Comics.

== Summary ==
The popularity of TV's Wonder Woman and The Six Million Dollar Man spurred network interest in reviving the Super Friends program, which had run in the 1973/1974 season. When it was again unveiled in 1977, more young children and teenagers than before tuned in, making The All-New Super Friends Hour a huge ratings success. The success prompted the ABC television network to plan a new and even more innovative series for the Fall of 1978.

== Characters ==
In this particular incarnation of the Super Friends, the DC Comic book characters Superman, Batman, Robin, Wonder Woman and Aquaman return to fight for justice. This time however they get help from the shape-shifting super-teens The Wonder Twins, along with their space-monkey Gleek.

== Format ==
The All-New Super Friends Hour featured 15 episodes of 60 minutes each, which followed a basic format each week. The first segment of every show featured two of the heroes (for the purposes of the team-ups in the first and fourth segments, Batman and Robin were considered one hero) teaming up in a separate mini story. The second segment featured a story with the Wonder Twins. The typical plot is that teenagers engage in a specific discouraged activity like vandalism or hitchhiking, and the Twins are summoned to deal with it. Inevitably, the misbehaving teenagers find themselves in danger as a consequence of their misbehavior and the Twins rescue them.

The third segment was considered the "primary" adventure of the week which featured the entire Super Friends roster (including the Wonder Twins) in a longer adventure. The fourth and final segment featured a story with one of the primary lineup along with a special guest star. The fourth segment typically featured a problem which was solved using the guest star's unique abilities. In addition, there were additional short spots between segments with members of the Super Friends giving basic safety lessons, basic health and first aid advice, magic tricks, craft projects, and a two-part riddle featuring the week's primary plot line.

== Syndication/cable ==
The 15 hour-long shows were later cut into half-hour installments for local syndication in the early 1980s. Episodes from the 1977 series were included in The Superman/Batman Adventures, which aired on the USA Network in 1996 and later on the Cartoon Network and Boomerang, which would air the original hour-long shows from 1977 in their entirety (save for the next week's previews) in July 2004 and again in June 2008.

== Character lineup ==
- Superman
- Batman
- Robin
- Wonder Woman
- Aquaman
- The Wonder Twins
  - Zan
  - Jayna
  - Gleek

=== Guests ===
- Black Vulcan
- Apache Chief
- Hawkman
- Hawkgirl
- Rima the Jungle Girl
- The Atom (Ray Palmer)
- Green Lantern (Hal Jordan)
- Samurai
- The Flash (Barry Allen)

Black Manta appeared on the episodes "The Whirlpool" and "The Water Beast", where he was referred to simply as "Manta" and his suit color was now olive brown.

Gentleman Ghost appears in the episode titled "Ghost". In this show, he is referred to only as "Gentleman Jim Craddock" instead of "Gentleman Ghost". A man casts a spell to bring Gentleman Ghost to the living so that he can take revenge on Superman and Wonder Woman for imprisoning his spirit. He uses his powers to turn U.N. representatives into ghosts and later turns Superman and Wonder Woman into ghosts. The curse is eventually broken, after which the Super Friends used the mystical Rods of Merlin to send Gentleman Ghost back to his grave, never to return.

== Cast ==
- Norman Alden – Aquaman, Caller, Professor Rogers (in "Will the World Collide?"), Gruth (in "The Ghost"), Earthor #1 (in "Invasion of the Earthors")
- Jack Angel – Hawkman, Samurai, Dr. Lau (in "Time Rescue")
- Michael Bell – Zan, Gleek, Mechanic (in "Joy Ride"), Jeff (in "Joy Ride"), Kalmo (in "The Mysterious Time Creatures"), Sully (in "Runaways"), Gary
- Wally Burr – Atom, Secret Four Member #1 (in "The Secret Four"), The Enforcer (in "The Enforcer"), Peterson (in "The Invisible Menace"), Dr. Pisces (in "Attack of the Giant Squid"), Newton's son (in "The Collector"), Zeno Leader (in "Exploration Earth"), Lionex (in "The Lion Men"), Bus Depot Cashier (in "Runaways")
- Ted Cassidy – Crag the Earthor (in "Invasion of the Earthors")
- Henry Corden – Vika (in "Tibetan Raiders"), Rudolph Korloff (in "The Mummy of Nazca")
- Regis Cordic – Manta, Apache Chief (first appearance), Nemus (in "The Invisible Menace"), Professor Martinez (in "The Water Beast"), Jules (in "The Marsh Monster")
- Danny Dark – Superman
- Shannon Farnon – Wonder Woman, Rima, Hawkgirl, Drowning Boy, Newton's daughter (in "The Collector"), Dr. Amy Zahn (in "The Fifty Foot Woman"), Dr. Taylor (in "The Fifty Foot Woman")
- Pat Fraley – Ron (in "Handicap"), Jack (in "Cheating")
- Bob Hastings – Corky (in "Joy Ride"), Scott (in "Handicap")
- Buster Jones – Black Vulcan
- Jane Jones – Suzie (in "Tiger on the Loose"), Jody (in "Hitchhike")
- Casey Kasem – Robin, Police Officer (in "The Brain Machine"), Tour Guide (in "Invasion of the Earthors"), Mr. Brown, Guest, Justice League Computer, Secret Four Member #3 (in "The Secret Four"), Dictor (in "The Mysterious Time Creatures"), Insecta (in "Coming of the Antropods"), Brunette Scientist (in "The Marsh Monster"), Professor Larvey (in "Will the World Collide?)
- Joyce Mancini – Mary Nelson (in "Tiny World of Terror")
- Ross Martin – Dr. Cranum (in "The Brain Machine"), Professor Strickland (in "Tiny World of Terror")
- Chuck McClennan – Mongor (in "City in a Bottle")
- Alan Oppenheimer – Doctor Fright (in "Doctor Fright"), Wolfman (in "The Man Beasts of Xra"), The Marsh Monster (in "The Marsh Monster"), Gentleman Ghost (in "The Ghost"), Scientist (in "The Ghost")
- Richard Paul – Professor Price (in "Forbidden Power")
- Barney Phillips – Flash (in "Tibetan Raiders")
- Robert Ridgely - Captain Shark (in "The Protector")
- Mike Road – Varko (in "Planet of the Neanderthals")
- Michael Rye – Apache Chief, Green Lantern, Abominable Snowman (in "Alaska Peril")
- Ronnie Schell – First Mate (in "The Whirlpool")
- Olan Soule – Batman, Police Officer (in "The Brain Machine"), Secret Four Member #4 (in "The Secret Four") Professor Wong (in "Tiny World of Terror"), Professor Fearo (in "Will the World Collide?")
- John Stephenson – Police Officer (in "Doctor Fright"), Dr. Droid (in "The Monster of Dr. Droid"), Pantherman (in "The Man Beasts of Xra"), Sculpin (in "Frozen Peril"), Freighter Captain (in "Frozen Peril")
- Robert Towers – Hydronoid Captain (in "Invasion of the Hydronoids")
- Jean Vander Pyl – Medula (in "The Mind Maidens"), Dr. Xra (in "The Man Beasts of Xra"), Magda Duval (in "The Marsh Monster")
- Louise "Liberty" Williams – Jayna, Little Sister
- Bill Woodson – Narrator, Captain Croner (in "The Whirlpool"), Dr. Scat (in "The Brain Machine"), Police Chief (in "The Brain Machine"), Earthor #2 (in "Invasion of the Earthors"), Secret Four Member #2 (in "The Secret Four"), Hydronoid Ruler (in "Invasion of the Hydronoids"), Mr. Thompson (in "Doctor Fright"), Professor (in "Doctor Fright"), Boris (in "The Monster of Dr. Droid"), Professor Fairweather (in "The Invisible Menace"), Newton Domehead (in "The Collector"), Professor Dalton (in "Alaska Peril"), Professor Zarkoff (in "Forbidden Power"), Mutant (in "Forbidden Power"), Dr. Markham (in "The Man Beasts of Xra"), Jay's Pop (in "Runaways"), Cleazor (in "Will the World Collide?"), Professor Comstock (in "Time Rescue")

== Episodes ==
No. overall	No. in season	Title	Original release date
17a	1a	"The Brain Machine"	September 10, 1977
Wonder Woman, Batman and Robin meet up with a misguided genius, Dr. Cranum, and his Brain Machine. Cameos: Superman and Aquaman
17b	1b	"Joy Ride"	September 10, 1977
The Wonder Twins and space monkey Gleek have to teach some youngsters a lesson about the dangers of joyriding in an airplane.
17c	1c	"Invasion of the Earthors"	September 10, 1977
The Super Friends match wits and skills in an underground adventure against the mysterious mining monsters known as the Earthors.
17d	1d	"The Whirlpool"	September 10, 1977
Aquaman and special guest Black Vulcan find themselves facing the force of a shipwrecking whirlpool. Cameos: Batman, Robin, and Wonder Woman Absent: Superman Note: This is the first time that Superman did not appear.
18a	2a	"The Secret Four"	September 17, 1977
Superman, Batman and Robin are outnumbered but not outsmarted when they change the plans of the mysterious Secret Four. Cameos: Wonder Woman and Aquaman
18b	2b	"Tiger on the Loose"	September 17, 1977
The outer-space Wonder Twins and Gleek point out the error of jumping to conclusions as they tackle an escaped tiger and try to end the confusion on how the tiger got out in the first place.
18c	2c	"The Mysterious Time Creatures"	September 17, 1977
The Super Friends defeat Dictor, who uses an aging/reverse aging technology as a weapon to depose the peaceful elected president of their planet with his totalitarian rule of fear and keep him from conquering the universe.
18d	2d	"The Antidote"	September 17, 1977
An earthquake occurs in India, where the tremors force many cobras out into the open where they bite villagers, exhausting India's antivenom supply. The Red Cross appeals to the Super Friends for help, who deploy Wonder Woman and Apache Chief to India. The pair learn a gigantic cobra called Kataru lives in a jungle temple, whom they must milk for its venom in order to make antivenom, or else hundreds of people will soon die of envenomation. Cameos: Superman, Batman, Robin, and Aquaman
19a	3a	"Invasion of the Hydronoids"	September 24, 1977
Aquaman, Batman and Robin meet the menacing Hydronoids in a struggle to save the world from their evil invasion. Cameos: Superman and Wonder Woman
19b	3b	"Hitchhike"	September 24, 1977
The Wonder Twins and space monkey Gleek have a serious problem on their hands when they use their Exxor powers to detour the dangers of hitchhiking when a girl doing so is kidnapped.
19c	3c	"City in a Bottle"	September 24, 1977
The Super Friends travel to a far-off frozen planet to rescue an entire Earth city stolen by the marauding Mongor.
19d	3d	"Space Emergency"	September 24, 1977
Wonder Woman with special guests Hawkman and Hawkgirl use their special skills in a space emergency. Cameos: Superman, Batman, Robin, and Aquaman
20a	4a	"Doctor Fright"	October 1, 1977
Superman and Wonder Woman show no fear when they meet up with the terrifying Doctor Fright. Cameos: Batman, Robin, and Aquaman
20b	4b	"Drag Race"	October 1, 1977
The Wonder Twins, Zan and Jayna, and Gleek have to teach a lesson about the dangers of street drag racing.
20c	4c	"Day of the Plant Creatures"	October 1, 1977
The Super Friends must call on their skills to overcome the perils of monstrous plant creatures.
20d	4d	"Fire"	October 1, 1977
Batman, Robin and special guest Rima battle a raging forest fire and find two escaped juvenile convicts who end up saving a family's lives. Cameos: Superman, Wonder Woman and Aquaman
21a	5a	"The Monster of Dr. Droid"	October 8, 1977
Superman and Wonder Woman go on an electrifying adventure when they meet the marauding monster of Dr. Droid. Cameos: Batman, Robin, and Aquaman
21b	5b	"Vandals"	October 8, 1977
The Wonder Twins and Gleek have a few special tricks up their sleeve when a couple of thoughtless students turn into school vandals.
21c	5c	"Super Friends vs. Super Friends"	October 8, 1977
The Super Friends find themselves in critical combat against each other when they become captives of Tyrannic, the ruler of the underseas world of Oceana.
21d	5d	"Energy Mass"	October 8, 1977
Batman and Robin with special guest the Atom are called on to save a speeding passenger train that has been taken over by a critical energy mass. Cameos: Superman, Wonder Woman, Aquaman, and the Wonder Twins
22a	6a	"The Enforcer"	October 15, 1977
Upon encountering a man named Garth-1 on a South Pacific Island, Wonder Woman and Aquaman head to his home Arcava (an underground city within a deserted South Pacific Island) to help free his people from an evil dictator called the Enforcer. Cameos: Superman, Batman, and Robin Note: The show's announcer mentioned Wonder Woman and Superman were involved in this episode's crimefighting task. It was actually Aquaman, not Superman, although Superman was seen in the Hall of Justice scenes.
22b	6b	"Shark"	October 15, 1977
The Wonder Twins, Zan and Jayna, must save two boys that are trapped underwater by a shark.
22c	6c	"Planet of the Neanderthals"	October 15, 1977
An evil scientist known as Varko devolves Earth back to a prehistoric planet and brings Neanderthals under his command to the present, which will remain so unless the Super Friends can stop him and retrieve the machine responsible for this from the prehistoric times it was placed in. With the help of Skylab, they build a time tunnel and bring his device back, restoring the world.
22d	6d	"Flood of Diamonds"	October 15, 1977
Aquaman and Green Lantern head to Africa to save trapped miners in a diamond mine that is slowly flooding. Cameos: Superman, Batman, Robin, and Wonder Woman
23a	7a	"The Invisible Menace"	October 22, 1977
Superman and Aquaman discover a deep down mystery of sinister submarines and sea life as they battle the Invisible Menace. Cameos: Batman, Robin, and Wonder Woman
23b	7b	"Initiation"	October 22, 1977
The Wonder Twins and Gleek excel with Exxorian powers when they have to bring a dangerous initiation stunt revolving around a bear's cave to a safe ending.
23c	7c	"Coming of the Arthropods"	October 22, 1977
The Super Friends zoom off in an all out struggle against invading insects from a far off planet, for the entire Earth is threatened by the coming of the Arthropods, led by the evil Insecta.
23d	7d	"River of Doom"	October 22, 1977
Flying over jungle rain forests, Wonder Woman and Rima search for some missing scientists who are about to become victims of the River of Doom. Cameos: Superman, Batman, Robin, and Aquaman
24a	8a	"Attack of the Giant Squid"	October 29, 1977
Superman and Aquaman find themselves entangled in a deep-sea mystery when they meet the tentacled attack of a giant squid. Cameos: Batman, Robin, and Wonder Woman
24b	8b	"Game of Chicken"	October 29, 1977
The Wonder Twins and their space monkey Gleek teach some young people the serious dangers of playing the foolish game of "Chicken".
24c	8c	"The Water Beast"	October 29, 1977
It is the Super Friends' problem when trouble surfaces on the high seas. All are in trouble from the menace of the deep, the marauding Manta and his terrifying water beast.
24d	8d	"Volcano"	October 29, 1977
Superman and special guest hero Samurai face the heat of a volcano in making a dangerous rescue of space aliens too paranoid of the natives to request help. Cameos, Batman, Robin, Wonder Woman and Aquaman
25a	9a	"The Collector"	November 5, 1977
Superman and Wonder Woman save priceless treasures and monuments from the greedy grasp of the Collector, who has invented a device that turns objects into photographs and plans to do this to various monuments and artworks to protect the items from decay, destruction and vandalism. Cameos: Batman, Robin, and Aquaman
25b	9b	"Handicap"	November 5, 1977
The Wonder Twins and Gleek help teach a lesson in courage when they rescue a boy from the wreckage of an overturned van.
25c	9c	"The Mind Maidens"	November 5, 1977
The Super Friends must use all of their superpowers in order to overcome the mental mischief of Medula and her power-hungry plans to eradicate all men so women led by her can rule the world.
25d	9d	"Alaska Peril"	November 5, 1977
Batman and Robin and special guest Apache Chief head toward the Northern Lakes to save an expedition from a giant snow creature. Cameos: Superman, Wonder Woman and Aquaman
26a	10a	"The Fifty Foot Woman"	November 12, 1977
A woman named Professor Amy Zhan makes a super strength potion, which turns her into a 50-foot woman. Batman, Robin and Wonder Woman must look up to the incredible femme fatale and find a way to bring this 50-foot woman back to normal size. Professor Amy Zahn tries to make Batman 50 feet tall, but is stopped when her assistant sprays her with the antidote. Absent: Superman and Aquaman Note: This is the first episode that Aquaman did not appear.
26b	10b	"Cheating"	November 12, 1977
The Wonder Twins and Gleek teach a lesson in honesty when a double-crossing cross-country runner has a misadventure in cheating. Absent: Superman
26c	10c	"Exploration: Earth"	November 12, 1977
A sinister space probe from planet Zeno visits Earth to capture people and objects for scientific study. The Super Friends must stop "Exploration Earth".
26d	10d	"Attack of the Killer Bees"	November 12, 1977
Aquaman and special guest superhero Samurai use super teamwork to save an African village from the attack of the killer bees. Cameos: Batman, Robin, Wonder Woman, and the Wonder Twins Absent: Superman
27a	11a	"Forbidden Power"	November 19, 1977
Batman, Robin and Wonder Woman must save the world from the mysterious mutants of the space sphere and its forbidden power. Cameos: Superman and Aquaman
27b	11b	"Pressure Point"	November 19, 1977
The Wonder Twins and Gleek travel into the hot desert to cool the dangerous canyon jumping stunts of some reckless motorcyclists.
27c	11c	"The Lionmen"	November 19, 1977
A spaceship controlled by mysterious Lionmen probes for minerals and starts an earth-shaking process that splits the planet into pieces.
27d	11d	"The Day of the Rats"	November 19, 1977
An experimental electronic device turns sewer rats mad, forcing Batman, Robin and Black Vulcan to save Gotham from the rats. Cameos: Superman, Wonder Woman, and Aquaman
28a	12a	"The Man Beasts of Xra"	November 24, 1977
Superman, Batman and Robin have to save society from the outrageous genetic experiments of a mixed-up scientist and her half-human, half-animal beasts. Cameos: Aquaman and Jayna Absent: Wonder Woman Note: This is the first time that Wonder Woman does not appear. Aired in Primetime
28b	12b	"Prejudice"	November 24, 1977
The Wonder Twins and Gleek have to teach a serious lesson in brotherhood when the ugliness of prejudice gets some young people into trouble. Note: Aired in Primetime
28c	12c	"Tiny World of Terror"	November 24, 1977
The Super Friends have to do some big thinking when the world is endangered by a shrinking machine in the hands of a greedy inventor. Note: Aired in Primetime
28d	12d	"Tibetan Raiders"	November 24, 1977
The passengers of a disabled aircraft stranded in rural Tibet get instant attention as Superman and the Flash rush to save them from Tibetan raiders. Cameos: Batman, Robin, Wonder Woman, and Aquaman Note: Aired in Primetime
29a	13a	"Frozen Peril"	November 26, 1977
Superman and Aquaman turn the heat on the sinister Sculpin's plans to freeze the world's oceans so he can sell their thawed water to desert countries. Cameos: Batman, Robin, Wonder Woman, Wonder Twins, and Gleek
29b	13b	"Dangerous Prank"	November 26, 1977
The Wonder Twins and Gleek have to save a girl from the perils of a dangerous prank played by some thoughtless companions.
29c	13c	"The Mummy of Nazca"	November 26, 1977
The Super Friends are called into action when the weird Professor Korloff brings a mysterious mummy to life to steal a cosmic power source for himself.
29d	13d	"Cable Car Rescue"	November 26, 1977
Wonder Woman and the Atom swing into action to save a cable carload of passengers caught in a high wind over a treacherous terrain. Cameos: Superman, Batman, Robin, Aquaman, Wonder Twins, and Gleek
30a	14a	"The Marsh Monster"	December 3, 1977
Superman, Batman and Robin move into action when an inventor's valuable plans are put in peril by the terrorizing tactics of a mysterious Marsh Monster. Cameos: Wonder Woman and Aquaman
30b	14b	"The Runaways"	December 3, 1977
The far from home Wonder Twins and Gleek try to rescue some misguided teenagers who face trouble when they decide to become runaways.
30c	14c	"Will the World Collide?"	December 3, 1977
The Super Friends exhibit all their bravery against the super sinister scheme of the vengeful Professor Fearo and the threat of a world collision.
30d	14d	"Time Rescue"	December 3, 1977
A scientist finds trouble when a time machine puts him 2,000 years into the future and he is captured by desert slavers. Superman, Hawkman and Hawkgirl come to his rescue. Absent: Batman, Robin, Wonder Woman, Aquaman, The Wonder Twins, and Gleek. Note 1: This is the first time that Batman and Robin do not appear. Note 2: The design of this episode seems to be based on Tatooine from that year's Star Wars.
31a	15a	"The Protector"	December 10, 1977
Batman, Robin and Aquaman put to sea in an effort to end the pirating and pillaging of Captain Shark and his immobilizing ray. Cameos: Superman, Wonder Woman, Wonder Twins, and Gleek
31b	15b	"Stowaways"	December 10, 1977
The Wonder Twins activate their special powers to save a couple of girls who try an ill-advised adventure as stowaways and almost become flotsam and jetsam.
31c	15c	"The Ghost"	December 10, 1977
The Super Friends tackle the supernatural when the Ghost, a villain from the past, is freed from his imprisonment and wants to take revenge on Superman and Wonder Woman for imprisoning his spirit by threatening the world with his ghostly fate if they do not surrender themselves to him. Now the other Super Friends members must save Superman and Wonder Woman before it is too late.
31d	15d	"Rampage"	December 10, 1977
In India, Superman and Green Lantern have their hands full when a huge, wild white elephant tears through jungles and villages on a rampage looking for its baby. Cameos: Batman, Robin, Wonder Woman and Aquaman

== Home media ==
Warner Home Video (via DC Comics Entertainment, Hanna-Barbera Cartoons and Warner Bros. Family Entertainment) released The All-New Super Friends Hour – Season 1, Volume 1 on DVD on January 8, 2008, containing 7 uncut, original episodes (28 cartoon segments), restored and remastered, and presented in its original, unedited hour-long version and original broadcast presentation. The episodes however are not in their original airdate order just as they originally aired on ABC. Warner released The All-New Super Friends Hour – Season 1, Volume 2 in January 2009, featuring the remaining eight episodes.

DVD name	Ep No.	Release date
Season 1, Volume 1	7 (28 cartoons)	January 8, 2008
Season 1, Volume 2	8 (32 cartoons)	January 27, 2009

== DC Super Friends ==
Despite using the main theme from The World's Greatest SuperFriends, the 2010 DC Super Friends "The Joker's Playhouse" shares several elements of its opening sequence with The All-New Super Friends Hour including introducing several of the Super Friends by name.

== Trivia ==
- Family Guy once did a parody of the show's intro with its main characters replacing the original cast in the episode "Family Goy" (Peter Griffin played as Superman, Lois Griffin as Wonder Woman, Brian Griffin as Batman, Stewie Griffin as Robin and Chris Griffin as Aquaman), all except for Meg Griffin, who was just seen standing in the living room in place of the Wonder Twins and Gleek.
