= Olan Soule =

American actor and voiceover performer (1909–1994)

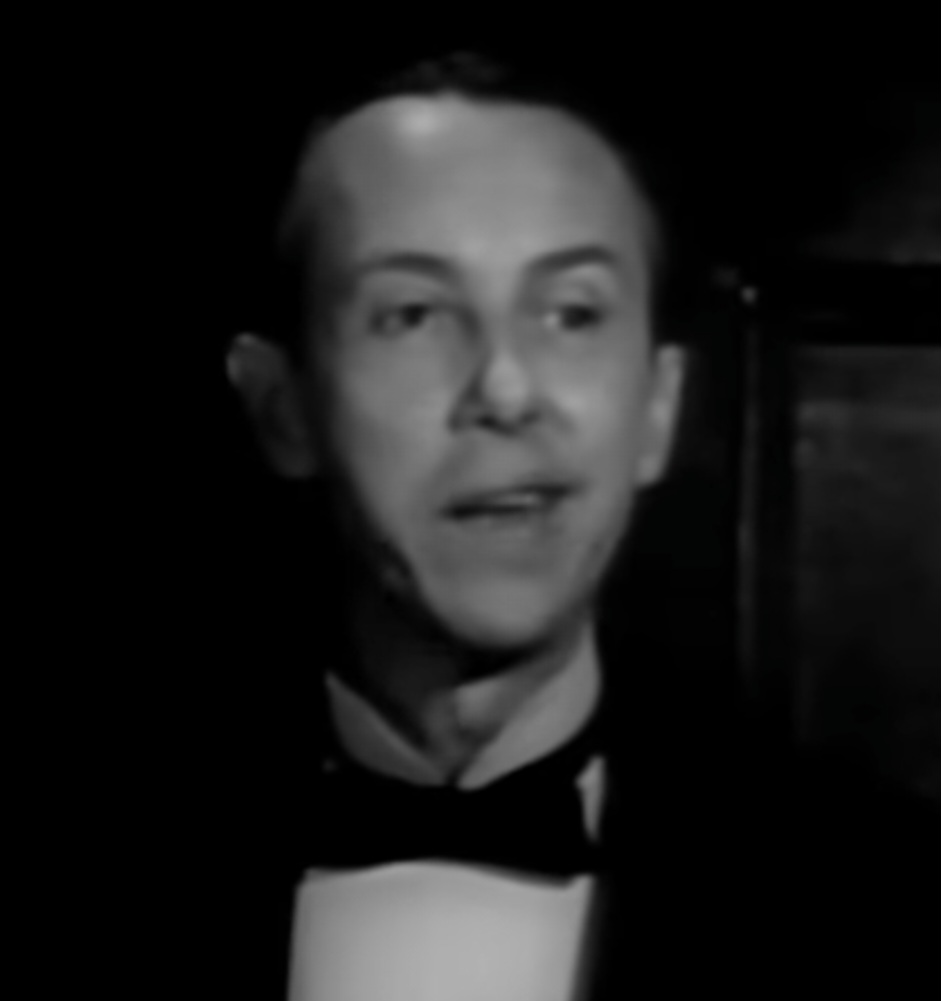
- Soule in the TV series One Step Beyond, episode Earthquake, 1961
- Born: Alan Evart Soule; February 28, 1909; La Harpe, Illinois, US
- Died: February 1, 1994 (aged 84); Corona, California, US
- Resting place: Forest Lawn - Hollywood Hills Cemetery
- Other names: Alan Soule; Alan Soulé; Olan Soulé
- Occupation: Actor
- Years active: 1926–1991
- Spouse: Norma Elizabeth Miller (m. 1929-1992; her death)
- Children: 2 (Jo Ann and Jon)

Olan Soule (February 28, 1909 – February 1, 1994) was an American actor, who had professional credits in nearly 7,000 radio shows and commercials, appearances in 200 television series and television films, and in over 60 films.

He was the only actor who performed on both the Captain Midnight radio and television shows.

== Early life ==
Born in 1909 as Alan Evart Soule in La Harpe, Illinois, to Elbert and Ann (Williams) Soule (descendants of three Mayflower passengers), he left Illinois at the age of seven and arrived in Des Moines, Iowa, where he lived until he was seventeen. He then launched his theatrical career by joining Jack Brooks' tent show in Sabula, Jackson County, Iowa.

== Career ==
=== Radio ===
After leaving the tent show, Soule appeared on stage in Chicago for seven years before moving to radio in 1933, including a stint on Chandu the Magician (1935–36). On radio he performed for eleven years in the daytime soap opera Bachelor's Children.

Beginning in 1943, he played lead male characters on radio's famed The First Nighter Program for nine years. Listeners of First Nighter who met Soule in person were often surprised, since his slight 135-pound frame did not seem to match the voices he gave to his characters. From 1941 on, Soule had the role of L. William Kelly, SS-11, the second in command of the Secret Squadron on the Captain Midnight radio adventure serial.

=== Television and films ===
Concluding his nine-year run on First Nighter, Soule moved to Hollywood, where he appeared in films and television shows, building a reputation as a reliable character actor. Soule said "Because of my build and glasses, I've mostly played lab technicians, newscasters and railroad clerks."

Soule appeared as Mr. Krull, a boarding house resident in the movie The Day The Earth Stood Still. He played a telegraph operator in the TV series Wanted: Dead or Alive, Season 2 Episode 7, "The Empty Cell," which aired October 16, 1959. He also acted in many other television series, including: The Donald O'Connor Show (as a semi-regular), Captain Midnight (as scientist Aristotle "Tut" Jones), I Love Lucy (several appearances as a hotel clerk), and The Andy Griffith Show (choir director John Masters).

He also played many different television roles for Jack Webb's Mark VII Productions. In the original TV and radio versions of Dragnet, he had a semi-regular role as real-life LAPD criminalist Ray Pinker, and in the 1967-70 revival version he played the slightly renamed but essentially identical LAPD criminalist Ray Murray. Other Mark VII shows on which he appeared included Adam-12, Emergency! and Project U.F.O..

In between the two Dragnet gigs, he had a similar semi-regular role on another LAPD-based TV series, The New Breed, as an unnamed "lab technician." He also made six appearances on Perry Mason, mostly as a court clerk, but also as a bank employee and water company official. He made at least two appearances on Petticoat Junction. In both, the 1967 episode "Shoplifter at the Shady Rest" and the 1968 episode "Mae's Helping Hand", he played Mr. Benson. In addition, he appeared several times as the clerk of the Carlton Hotel, the San Francisco residence of the character Paladin, in the TV series, Have Gun – Will Travel.

The list of Soule's supporting and starring roles is long. They include The Addams Family, The Alfred Hitchcock Hour, Alfred Hitchcock Presents, Behind Closed Doors, The Beverly Hillbillies, Bewitched, Bonanza, Buck Rogers in the 25th Century, City Detective, Dallas, The Danny Thomas Show, Dante, Dennis the Menace, Fantasy Island, The George Burns and Gracie Allen Show, Gunsmoke, Happy, Harrigan and Son, Hennesey, The Jack Benny Program, The Jean Arthur Show, Johnny Ringo, Laramie, Little House on the Prairie, Mission: Impossible, Mister Ed, The Monkees, The Munsters, My Favorite Martian, One Step Beyond, Pete and Gladys, Rawhide, The Real McCoys, The Rebel, The Restless Gun, The Rookies, Simon & Simon, The Six Million Dollar Man, State Trooper, The Tab Hunter Show, The Twilight Zone, The Untouchables and The Virginian.

=== Batman ===
Soule is known for voicing Batman in several animated series. He first performed as the Caped Crusader on the 1968 Filmation-produced The Batman/Superman Hour. He reprised his role as Batman on The New Scooby-Doo Movies, Sesame Street (1970), Super Friends (1973), The All-New Super Friends Hour, Challenge of the Superfriends, The World's Greatest Super Friends, and Super Friends (1980). He appeared as a newscaster on the live-action Batman television series (in the episode "The Pharaoh's in a Rut") with his Super Friends successor, Adam West. After West returned to the role of Batman in Super Friends, Soule continued to contribute to the Super Friends: The Legendary Super Powers Show series, providing the voice of Martin Stein, one half of the hero Firestorm.

=== Other voice-over work ===
Soule provided the voice of Master Taj in the English-dubbed version of the cult 1973 film Fantastic Planet in addition to his work as Batman.

== Death ==
On February 1, 1994, aged 84, Soule died of lung cancer in Corona, California, at the home of his daughter, Jo Ann, and son-in-law, Dr. David Henriksen.

== Selected filmography ==
- It's a Great Feeling (1949) - Flack (uncredited)
- Destination Big House (1950) - Ralph Newell
- Cuban Fireball (1951) - Jimmy
- The Atomic City (1952) - Mortie Fenton
- Francis Joins the WACS (1954) - Captain Creavy, Psychiatrist
- Dragnet (1954) - Ray Pinker
- Cult of the Cobra (1955) - Major Martin Fielding
- -30- (1959) - Vince, the sports editor
- North By Northwest (1959) - Assistant Auctioneer (uncredited)
- The Bubble (1966) - Watch Repairman
- The Destructors (1968) - Mace
- The Seven Minutes (1971) - Harvey Underwood
- Fantastic Planet (1973) - Master Taj, Draag, Additional Voices (English version, voice)
- The Towering Inferno (1974) - Johnson
- The Apple Dumpling Gang (1975) - Rube Cluck
- St. Ives (1976) - Station Man
- The Shaggy D.A. (1976) - Bar Patron

== Selected television roles ==
Year	Title	Role	Notes
1955	Alfred Hitchcock Presents	Chemist	Season 1 Episode 8: "Our Cook's a Treasure"
1956	Alfred Hitchcock Presents	Art Dealer	Season 1 Episode 28: "Portrait of Jocelyn"
1958	Alfred Hitchcock Presents	Stagehand (uncredited)	Season 3 Episode 39: "Little White Frock"
1959	Alfred Hitchcock Presents	Bookstore Clerk (uncredited)	Season 5 Episode 14: "Graduating Class"
1959	Have Gun - Will Travel	Clerk	Season 3, Episode 9 "The Black Handkerchief"
1960	Wanted: Dead or Alive	Simon Denton	Season 3, Episode 8 "To the Victor"
1961	Alfred Hitchcock Presents	Darlene's Daddy	Season 7 Episode 2: "Bang! You're Dead"
1961	Wanted: Dead or Alive	Clerk	Season 3, Episode 24 "The Long Search"
1961	Rawhide	Bartender	S3:E22, "Incident in the Middle of Nowhere"
1962	Alfred Hitchcock Presents	Brother Fish	Season 7 Episode 17: "The Faith of Aaron Menefee"
1962	The Alfred Hitchcock Hour	Bill the Neighbor	Season 1 Episode 11: "Ride the Nightmare"
1963	The Alfred Hitchcock Hour	Court Clerk (uncredited)	Season 1 Episode 15: "The Thirty-First of February"
1965	My Favorite Martian	Daniel Farrow	Season 2, Episode 32 "Martin's Favorite Martian"
1965	Gunsmoke	Barber	Season 11, Episode 14 "The Avengers"
1967	The Monkees	Waiter	S1:E30, "Monkees in Manhattan"
1968	The Virginian	Sidney Glodder	Season 7 episode 13 (Big Tiny)
1973	The Rookies	Sam	Season 2, Episode 12 "Lots of Trees and a Running Stream"

Preceded by Gary Merrill	Voice of Batman; 1968-1974	Succeeded by Adam West
Preceded by Adam West	Voice of Batman; 1977-1983	Succeeded by Adam West
