= Samurai (Super Friends) =

- Samurai on Super Friends.

Publication information
- First appearance: The All-New Super Friends Hour "Volcano"
- Created by: Hanna-Barbera

In-story information
- Alter ego: Toshio Eto
- Species: Metahuman
- Team affiliations: Super Friends; Justice League
- Partnerships: Apache Chief; El Dorado; Black Vulcan
- Abilities: Manipulation of fire and wind; Invisibility; Illusion casting

Samurai (Toshio Eto (江藤俊夫, Eto Toshio)) is a Japanese superhero in DC's Super Friends animated television series. He was one of the later additions to the team along with other ethnically diverse heroes in an effort for the show to promote cultural diversity, as Apache Chief, El Dorado and Black Vulcan. The character was designed by cartoonist Alex Toth and voiced by Jack Angel. Following sporadic guest appearances, Samurai becomes a prominent team member in the series' later seasons.

Samurai is later introduced into the main comics continuity during Infinite Crisis.

== Fictional character biography ==
=== Series ===
Toshio Eto is a history professor who gained his powers after being struck by a beam of light sent by the New Gods of New Genesis, who were trying to create superheroes to battle Darkseid. After the New Gods explain their motivations to him, Eto joins the Justice League as Samurai.

=== Comics ===
Samurai made DC comics appearances during the Justice League/Justice Society of America crossover featured in the Brightest Day event. Toshio appears as one of the heroes driven insane by Alan Scott's Starheart before being defeated by Jesse Quick and Congorilla.

Prior to Samurai's appearance in Brightest Day, an alternate version of the character named Toshio appears in the Justice League of America 80-Page Giant one-shot. He is a samurai from 13th-century Japan who was granted mystical abilities by a sorceress.

In Doomsday Clock, Samurai joins Japan's superhero team, Big Monster Action.

== In other media ==
=== Television ===
- A character inspired by Samurai called Wind Dragon appears in Justice League Unlimited, voiced by James Sie. He is an aerokinetic, genetically engineered superhero created by Project Cadmus to serve as the leader of their Ultimen and operate independently of the Justice League, though the former group are led to believe that they are regular metahumans.
- A character inspired by Samurai named Asami "Sam" Koizumi appears in Young Justice, voiced by Janice Kawaye. This version is a metahuman and ally of the Justice League with the ability to manipulate chi.

=== Film ===
- Samurai makes a cameo appearance in Scooby-Doo! Mask of the Blue Falcon.
- Samurai makes a cameo appearance in The Lego Batman Movie.

=== Merchandise ===
- Samurai received an action figure in the third wave of Kenner's Super Powers Collection.
- Samurai received an action figure in the Justice League Unlimited tie-in toyline as part of a three-pack with Black Vulcan and Apache Chief.
- Samurai received an action figure in Wave 18 of Mattel's DC Universe Classics line.
- Samurai received an 8" action figure by Figures Toy Company.
