= Wonder Twins =

DC Comics characters

- Zan and Jayna from Super Friends

Publication information
- First appearance: The All-New Super Friends Hour "Joy Ride" (September 10, 1977)
- First comic appearance: Super Friends #7 (October 1977) (Super Friends continuity); Extreme Justice #9 (October 1995) (first DCU appearance)
- Created by: Norman Maurer; Bill Hanna; Joe Barbera

In-story information
- Alter ego: Zan and Jayna
- Species: Exxorian
- Place of origin: Exxor
- Team affiliations: Super Friends; Justice League; Ten Elements of the Universe; Extreme Justice; Young Justice
- Abilities: (Zan): Water and ice mimicry; (Jayna): Animal morphing

The Wonder Twins (Zan and Jayna) are a fictional extraterrestrial twin brother and sister superhero duo and trio. Created by Norman Maurer, Bill Hanna, and Joe Barbera, the characters first appeared in 1977 in the seventh episode of Hanna-Barbera's American animated television series The All-New Super Friends Hour. The pair can activate their shapeshifter superpowers by touching their fists and saying the phrase "Wonder Twin powers, activate!" Jayna can transform into any animal, and Zan can become water in any state. The siblings are accompanied by a pet monkey, Gleek, who assists in their crime-fighting activities.

They subsequently appeared in comics based on the animated series and were later introduced into the main DC Comics Universe. They have since appeared in other media, including the live-action TV series Smallville and the animated series Teen Titans Go!

== Broadcast and publication history ==
The duo and trio made their debut in The All-New Super Friends Hour ("Joy Ride", September 10, 1977) and then appeared in The World's Greatest Super Friends, Super Friends, and Super Friends: The Legendary Super Powers Show. Zan (voiced by Michael Bell) and Jayna (voiced by Louise Williams from 1977 to 1983 and B. J. Ward in 1984) are siblings from the planet Exxor (also spelled Exor) who were being informally trained by the superheroes. Unlike their predecessors, Wendy Harris and Marvin White, this pair was able to participate in combat with abilities of their own.

Hanna-Barbera animator Darrell McNeil recalls the twins were created by Norman Maurer, the Super Friends series developer/story editor. They were originally called Dick and Jane, and their sidekick was Mighty Monkey, before finally becoming Zan, Jayna, and Gleek. The names "Zan" and "Jayna" derived from the Edgar Rice Burroughs characters Tarzan and his romantic interest Jane. According to McNeil: "Originally Zan (Dick) had 'Plastic Man' powers and Jayna (Jane) could transform into anything, not just animals, but they were scaled back to their present powers as it made the other Super Friends (even Superman) seem almost superfluous". Jayna's distinctive hairdo was based on that of an animation checker at Hanna-Barbera, while the pointed ears were inspired by the character Spock from the Star Trek franchise. The twins' personalities were heavily based on Donny and Marie Osmond, who were extremely popular at the time and had their own show on ABC as well.

The Wonder Twins were the most prominently featured characters in their first season on Super Friends. However, by the final seasons, the twins were largely marginalized in favor of established teenage superheroes like Firestorm, and were wholly eliminated in the final season in favor of Cyborg.

The characters were introduced to comics in issue #7 of the Super Friends tie-in series (cover-dated October 1977, but published in July), by E. Nelson Bridwell and Ramona Fradon. The Super Friends comic book provided considerably more details of the Wonder Twins' background and how they came to join the team than was provided in the television series. Because of the different production lag times between animation and comics, the first comic book appearance is chronologically before the first television appearance.

In the 1990s, they were introduced into the main DC Universe in Extreme Justice #9 (October 1995), by Ivan Velez Jr. and Al Rio. The series rewrote and updated their origin story. Velez, a fan of the Wonder Twins, intended to begin a revival of the characters, but was taken off the series after the first issue with the Wonder Twins. Though the twins remained with the series until its cancellation with #18, they were used only sparingly after Velez's departure.

Following the cancellation of Extreme Justice, the Wonder Twins showed up only sporadically in the DC Universe. After 2003, they made no significant appearance for sixteen years. In 2019, the characters received a six-issue Wonder Twins miniseries, written by Mark Russell and drawn by Stephen Byrne. The series was a critical and commercial success, and was extended into a 12-issue maxi-series.

In November 2019, the first six issues of Wonder Twins were collected as a trade paperback, and released under the title Wonder Twins - Activate. In August 2020, the second half of the maxi-series was released in another trade paperback titled The Fall & Rise of the Wonder Twins.

== Fictional character biography ==
=== Super Friends ===
Little background is provided for the Wonder Twins in Super Friends, save that they are superheroes-in-training that are friends of the Super Friends and were born on November 6.

According to the 1977 Super Friends comic book by writer E. Nelson Bridwell and artist Ramona Fradon, Zan and Jayna are Exxorian metahumans, genetic throwbacks to an ancient race of Exxorian shapeshifters. Their parents died due to a plague when they were young, and because of their origin, no Exxorians wanted to adopt them. They are adopted by the owner of a space circus who only wants to use them as sideshow freaks. However, the circus' clown (or "laugh-maker") is a kind man and raises them. He also gives them Gleek as a pet. Eventually, as teens, the pair escapes the circus and hides on a planet where a space villain called Grax (an enemy of Superman) has established his headquarters. Spying on him, they learn that Grax is planning to destroy the Earth with hidden superbombs. The twins decide to travel to Earth and warn the Justice League, which is how they come to replace Wendy and Marvin (who were planning on retiring as heroes anyway) as their sidekicks. The heroes arrange for the kids to live with an old scientist named Professor Carter Nichols and they take secret identities as Swedish transfer students Johan and Joanna Fleming to attend Gotham City High School.

=== In comics ===
Todd Nauck redesign of the characters for a 2002–03 Young Justice storyline

In 1996, the twins were introduced into post-Crisis DC continuity in the series Extreme Justice as escaped slaves of an alien overlord. Unable to speak English, they inadvertently attack some civilians and the Justice League. The pair are later emancipated by the Justice League and join Captain Atom's team in issue #16 (May 1996). That same year, they appeared in the crossover storyline "The Final Night" and in the series Total Justice.

In a 2002–03 storyline by Peter David and Todd Nauck in Young Justice, they help avenge the murder of Empress' parents, wearing uniforms which resembled T-shirts and jeans. In late 2003, they appeared in the fourth issue of the Marvel-DC intercompany crossover miniseries JLA/Avengers, which was written by Kurt Busiek and illustrated by George Pérez.

In 2007, they appeared in Teen Titans vol. 3 #70, and in 2011, and in DCU: Legacies #9, a story by Len Wein and Rob Leigh.

In Superpowers, a 2017 backup series in Cave Carson Has a Cybernetic Eye, cartoonist Tom Scioli offers a slightly different version of the origin of the Wonder Twins, set on an alternate Earth.

In February 2019, the first issue of a 12-issue mini-series was released on Wonder Comics titled Wonder Twins.

== Powers and abilities ==
The Wonder Twins' powers are activated when they touch each other and speak the phrase, "Wonder Twin powers, activate!" Physical contact is required. If the two are out of reach of each other, they are unable to activate their powers. As they are about to transform, they would each announce their intended form. "Shape of...", "Form of..."

Zan can transform into water at any state (solid, liquid, gas) and add to his mass by incorporating water in his immediate area. In the case of becoming solid ice, he can also become any form he chooses, from a 5,000-foot (1,500 m) humanoid ice giant to a cage for a criminal to complex machinery (such as a jet engine, as he did in the episode "Eruption"). In the episode "Pressure Point", he changes into a gelatinous form. In "Terror from the Phantom Zone", he was able to transform into liquid nitrogen. In addition, he can transform himself into atmospheric disturbances (usually very localized) involving water, such as a blizzard, a monsoon, waterspout or a typhoon, as he did in the episodes "The Water Beast", "The Beasts are Coming", and "Stowaways".

Jayna can transform into any animal, whether real, mythological, indigenous to Earth, or alien. Since she must vocalize her choice of form to assume, she must know the common name. As revealed in "The Mummy of Nazca," she will assume the form of whatever animal she names, even if she intended a different animal and erred on the common name.

In the Super Friends comic book, their powers were shown to be more extensive. By transforming into an animal of Kryptonian origin, for instance, Jayna could gain both the creature's natural abilities and Kryptonian superpowers. Similarly, Zan was able to transform into anything tangentially related to water or ice, including a frost giant.

In addition to their powers of transformation, the two share a telepathic link, enabling one to alert the other over a distance when in dire circumstances.

== In other media ==
=== Television ===
Allison Scagliotti as Jayna and David Gallagher as Zan in the Smallville episode "Idol"

- Jayna appears in the Family Guy episode "Fast Times at Buddy Cianci Jr. High", voiced by Rachael MacFarlane. Additionally, Peter Griffin (voiced by Seth MacFarlane) appears as a former member of the Wonder Twins.
- Zan appears in the Harvey Birdman, Attorney at Law episode "Very Personal Injury", voiced by Michael Bell.
- A pair of characters inspired by the Wonder Twins called Downpour and Shifter appear in Justice League Unlimited, both voiced by Grey DeLisle. They are genetically engineered superheroes created by Project Cadmus to serve as members of their Ultimen and operate independently of the Justice League, though the former group are led to believe that they are regular metahumans.
- Zan and Jayna appear in the Smallville episode "Idol", portrayed by David Gallagher and Allison Scagliotti respectively. This version of the pair are implied to be from another world and pass themselves off as humans of Swedish descent.
  - Their origin is expanded upon in Smallville Season 11, where Zan and Jayna are shown to have been human children from an unidentified country on Earth who were evicted by their father for having metahuman powers. Additionally, the twins go on to join Jay Garrick's Teen Titans.
- The Wonder Twins appear in the Teen Titans Go! episode "You're Fired", with Zan voiced by Khary Payton and Jayna by Tara Strong.
- Kat Hudson, lead designer on DC Super Hero Girls and other projects, developed a pitch for an animated series based on the Wonder Twins, which went unproduced.

=== Film ===
- The Wonder Twins appear in The Lego Batman Movie. They are seen attending Superman's party at the Fortress of Solitude.
- The Wonder Twins make a cameo appearance in Teen Titans Go! To the Movies.
- In February 2022, a DC Extended Universe film centered around the Wonder Twins was in development, with Adam Sztykiel writing and directing, in his directorial debut. Marty Bowen and Wyck Godfrey were reported as producers on the film, which was to be a joint-venture production between DC Films and Temple Hill Entertainment, with KJ Apa and Isabel May as Zan and Jayna. The film was developed with an intended streaming release, exclusively through HBO Max, though it was later canceled due to budget cuts at Warner Bros. Discovery.
- The Super Friends incarnations of the Wonder Twins make a cameo appearance in Justice League: Crisis on Infinite Earths. This version of the duo come from Earth-508.

=== Video games ===
- The Wonder Twins appear as character summons in Scribblenauts Unmasked: A DC Comics Adventure.
- The Teen Titans Go! incarnations of the Wonder Twins appear in Lego Dimensions. Additionally, The Lego Batman Movie incarnations make cameo appearances in the film's eponymous DLC pack.

=== Miscellaneous ===
- The Wonder Twins appear in the Adult Swim web series The New Adventures of the Wonder Twins. This version of the pair are well-meaning but inept superheroes whose attempts at heroism always end in tragic failure.
- The Wonder Twins both appear in the LEGO Batman Movie Series 2 minifigures theme.
