= Buster Jones =

American actor

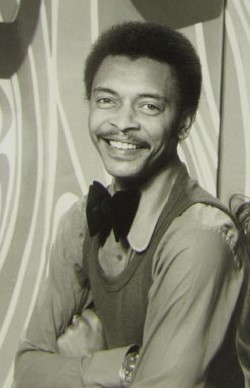
- Jones on Soul Unlimited in 1973
- Born: Edward Lorenzo Jones; December 12, 1943; Paris, Tennessee, U.S.
- Died: September 16, 2014 (aged 70); North Hollywood, California, U.S.
- Occupations: Voice actor, television host
- Years active: 1972–1998

Edward Lorenzo "Buster" Jones (December 12, 1943 – September 16, 2014) was an American voice actor and television host. He is known for his roles as Black Vulcan in Super Friends, Blaster in The Transformers, Doc in G.I. Joe: A Real American Hero and Winston Zeddemore in The Real Ghostbusters (replacing Arsenio Hall) and later Extreme Ghostbusters.

== Early life ==
Jones was born in Paris, Tennessee and attended Lane College in Jackson, Tennessee where he played in a band.

== Career ==
Jones got a job as a disc jockey. During his career as a DJ, he worked in Washington, D.C. and Los Angeles. He also did voice work in commercials, which led to his career as a voice actor in TV series.

Jones appeared as the host of Soul Unlimited, Dick Clark's short-lived all-black version of American Bandstand that was created as a competitor to Soul Train.

He also provided voices for Defenders of the Earth (as Lothar), The Super Globetrotters (as Spaghetti Man), Captain Planet and the Planeteers, and The New Batman Adventures.

== Death ==
Jones died at home in North Hollywood, California, on September 16, 2014, at the age of 70.

== Filmography ==
| Year | Title | Role | Notes |
|---|---|---|---|
| 1974 | The Six Million Dollar Man | Captain | Episode: "Day of the Robot" |
| 1977–1984 | Super Friends | Black Vulcan (voice) | Main cast |
| 1979 | The Super Globetrotters | Twiggy Sanders / Spaghetti Man (voice) | Main cast |
| 1979 | Captain America | Anesthetist | Television film |
| 1985–1986 | G.I. Joe: A Real American Hero | Doc, Zap (voice) | Main cast |
| 1985–1986 | The Transformers | Blaster (voice) | Recurring cast |
| 1986 | Defenders of the Earth | Lothar (voice) | Main cast |
| 1986 | The Transformers: The Movie | Blaster (voice) | |
| 1986–1987 | The Flintstone Kids | Officer Quartz (voice) | 3 episodes |
| 1987 | Hill Street Blues | Dog Owner | Episode: "Dogsbreath Afternoon" |
| 1987 | G.I. Joe: The Movie | Doc (voice) | |
| 1988–1991 | The Real Ghostbusters | Winston Zeddemore (voice) | Main cast; replacing Arsenio Hall |
| 1992 | Batman: The Animated Series | Night Manager (voice) | Episode: "Night of the Ninja" |
| 1997 | Extreme Ghostbusters | Winston Zeddemore (voice) | Episode: "Back in the Saddle" |
| 1998 | The New Batman Adventures | Judge (voice) | Episode: "Love Is a Croc" |
