= Gleek (Super Friends) =

Publication information
- Publisher: DC Comics
- First appearance: The All-New Super Friends Hour "Joy Ride"
- First comic appearance: Super Friends #7 (October 1977)
- Created by: Hanna-Barbera

In-story information
- Species: Exxorian Monkey
- Place of origin: Exxor
- Team affiliations: Super Friends
- Supporting character of: Wonder Twins
- Abilities: Prehensile tail; Bucket summoning

Gleek is a fictional character appearing in the animated series Super Friends and its related spin-offs. Gleek is the pet of the alien Wonder Twins, Zan and Jayna. He debuted in The All-New Super Friends Hour, which first aired September 10, 1977. Gleek's vocalizations were provided by Michael Bell, who also voiced Zan.

== Fictional character biography ==
=== Super Friends ===
Gleek is a blue monkey-like alien from the planet Exxor and the pet of Zan and Jayna, the Wonder Twins. Additionally, evil members of his species appear in the Super Friends (1980) episode "Invasion of the Gleeks".

=== Mainstream DC Universe ===
Gleek was incorporated into the mainstream DC Universe in Mark Russell and Stephen Byrne's 2019 Wonder Twins series. The series reimagined Zan and Jayna as alien teenagers who had been exiled from their homeworld and were attempting to adapt to life on Earth. They became associated with the Justice League and served as interns at the Hall of Justice.

Gleek makes his modern comic-book debut in Wonder Twins #2. The issue follows Zan and Jayna as they undertake an assignment for the Justice League while adjusting to their new life on Earth. The circumstances of Gleek's introduction differ from those of the original animated series. In the modern version, Gleek is introduced as a pet acquired by Zan rather than being established from the outset as the Wonder Twins' longstanding companion.

== Powers and abilities ==
Gleek has a stretchable, flexible tail that allows him to pick up objects and living things, such as bananas or people. He is highly intelligent, capable of understanding spoken English clearly. Gleek can communicate through the use of sign language, acting out scenes, and chattering (an alien monkey-based sound unintelligible to the audience).

== Other versions ==
- Gleek's first comic book appearance was Super Friends Volume One, Issue #7 (October 1977, DC Comics).
- Gleek appears on a missing poster in Batman: Li'l Gotham.
- Gleek appears in the Teen Titans Go! tie-in comic.
- Gleek appears in Wonder Twins #2 (March 2019).

== In other media ==
- Gleek makes a cameo appearance in the Harvey Birdman, Attorney at Law episode "Grape Juiced".
- Gleek makes a cameo appearance in the Smallville episode "Idol".
- Gleek makes a cameo appearance in the Batman: The Brave and the Bold episode "The Siege of Starro!".
- Gleek appears in the Robot Chicken episode "Sidekick Elevator".
- Gleek appears in the Adult Swim series The New Adventures of the Wonder Twins.
- Gleek makes a cameo appearance in The Lego Batman Movie.
- Gleek makes a cameo appearance in the Arrowverse crossover Crisis on Infinite Earths.
