= Black Vulcan =

- Super Friends, Harvey Birdman, and DC Comics character
- Black Vulcan as he appeared in Hanna-Barbera's Super Friends animated series in the 1970s and '80s.
- First appearance: "The Whirlpool" (The All-New Super Friends Hour; 1977)
- Last appearance: Harvey Birdman: Attorney General (2018)
- Created by: Alex Toth
- Voiced by: Buster Jones (Super Friends); Phil LaMarr (Harvey Birdman)

In-universe information
- Species: Metahuman
- Gender: Male
- Title(s): Supervolt; Mr. President (Harvey Birdman)
- Occupation: Superhero; President of the United States (Harvey Birdman)
- Affiliation: Super Friends; Justice League; Multi-Culture Pals
- Significant others: Norlisa (ex-girlfriend; Harvey Birdman)

44th/46th President of the United States
- In office January 20, 2009 – January 20, 2017 (1st term) October 12, 2018 – January 20, 2021 (2nd term)
- Partnerships: Apache Chief; Samurai; El Dorado
- Abilities: Electrokinesis; Flight; Time travel
- Catchphrases: "Great Lightning!" "In my pants." (Harvey Birdman)

Black Vulcan is an African-American superhero on the animated series Super Friends and Harvey Birdman, Attorney at Law by Hanna-Barbera, voiced in the former by Buster Jones and the latter by Phil LaMarr.

== Fictional character biography ==
=== Super Friends ===
Black Vulcan debuted in The All-New Super Friends Hour in September 1977. He was created to replace Black Lightning, who could not be used due to disputes between DC and the character's creator Jenny Blake Isabella. Vulcan was designed by cartoonist Alex Toth, responsible for the look of most Hanna-Barbera superheroes.

In the final incarnation of the series, The Super Powers Team: Galactic Guardians, Black Vulcan does not appear and fellow Black superhero Cyborg is introduced.

=== DC Comics ===
Comic book artist and Super Friends fan Alex Ross intended to create a modernized version of Black Vulcan for his rejected Captain Marvel series. The title would have had the character reimagined as Vulcan, an African-American child who could become an adult superhero after accidentally gaining the wizard Shazam's powers.

Black Vulcan makes a cameo appearance in the DC One Million 80-Page Giant special as a member of an alternate universe Justice League.

=== Harvey Birdman ===
==== Attorney at Law ====
Black Vulcan appears in Harvey Birdman, Attorney at Law, voiced by Phil LaMarr. This version describes his powers as "pure electricity... in my pants", which becomes a running gag throughout the series, and originally went by the codename "Supervolt" before calling himself Black Vulcan at Aquaman's suggestion. In his most notable appearance in the episode "Very Personal Injury", Black Vulcan and Apache Chief, among other superheroes, form the "Multicultural Pals".

==== Attorney General ====
Black Vulcan returns in Harvey Birdman: Attorney General, again voiced by LaMarr. Depicted as the 46th President of the United States preceding Phil Ken Sebben, who, on awakening amnesiac to find that he is now the 46.5th president, without having any memory of being elected, goes on to appoint his former employee and ghostwriter Harvey Birdman to the rank of attorney corporal to help him be removed from office, and instate Black Vulcan again in his place.

== Powers and abilities ==
Black Vulcan's powers include the ability to project bolts of electricity from his hands. By charging his lower body with energy, he can fly at superhuman speeds. On a few occasions, he exhibited capabilities such as converting his physical form into pure energy and traveling through light speed (in an unsuccessful attempt to escape a black hole). He was able to open a rift in spacetime via energy fluctuation. Black Vulcan is capable of spot/welding microelectronics.

== In other media ==
=== Television ===
- A character inspired by Black Vulcan named Juice appears in Justice League Unlimited, voiced by an uncredited CCH Pounder. He is an electrokinetic, genetically engineered superhero created by Project Cadmus to serve as a member of their Ultimen and operate independently of the Justice League, though the former group are led to believe that they are metahumans. Additionally, due to his powers, Juice speaks with a raspy voice that causes him to sound like he is speaking through a low-quality speaker or radio.

=== Film ===
- Black Vulcan makes a cameo appearance in Scooby-Doo! Mask of the Blue Falcon.
- Black Vulcan makes a cameo appearance in The Lego Batman Movie.

=== Merchandise ===
- Black Vulcan received a figure in the Justice League Unlimited tie-in toyline as part of a three-pack with Apache Chief and Samurai.
- A 6" Black Vulcan action figure was released in Wave 18 of Mattel's DC Universe Classics line.
- Black Vulcan received an 8" action figure by Figures Toy Company.
- Black Vulcan received a Lego minifigure in Series 2 of The Lego Batman Movie collectible minifigure line.
- Black Vulcan received an 6" action figure in the Retro Super Friends line by McFarlane Toys.
