= Lego Super Heroes =

Lego theme and product range

- Other names: Lego Batman, DC Universe Super Heroes, DC Comics Super Heroes, DC Super Heroes, DC, Lego Marvel Super Heroes, Marvel Avengers, Marvel Studios: The Infinity Saga, Marvel, Spider-Man
- Parent theme: Lego Studios (for Lego Spider-Man, 2002-2003)
- Sub‑themes: Lego Batman, DC Universe Super Heroes, DC Comics Super Heroes, DC Super Heroes, DC; Lego Marvel Super Heroes, Marvel Avengers, Marvel Studios: The Infinity Saga, Marvel, Spider-Man; The Incredibles; ——-———————————; Black Panther, Black Panther: Wakanda Forever, Batman (Classic TV series), The Batman, Black Widow, Captain Marvel, Carnage, The Dark Knight Trilogy, Doctor Strange in the Multiverse of Madness, Eternals, The Guardians of the Galaxy Holiday Special, Marvel Studios: Iron Man, Shang-Chi and the Legend of the Ten Rings, Spider-Man: Far from Home, Spider-Man: No Way Home, Thor: Love and Thunder, Venom, What If...?, Wolverine, Wonder Woman, WW84: Wonder Woman
- Subject: Super hero characters from DC Comics, Marvel Comics, their film incarnation and The Incredibles franchise
- Licensed from: DC Entertainment; Marvel Animation Studios; Pixar Animation Studios
- Availability: 2011–present
- Total sets: 450 (including promotional sets)
- Characters: DC Universe; Marvel Universe; The Incredibles franchise
- Official website

Lego Super Heroes (stylized as LEGO Super Heroes) is a theme and product range of the Lego construction toy, introduced in 2011, owned by The Lego Group and licensed from DC Entertainment, Marvel Entertainment, Warner Bros. Entertainment, The Walt Disney Company and Pixar.

== Overview ==
The theme features various superhero characters who have appeared in the DC Universe and the Marvel Universe and their film series and Pixar's The Incredibles franchise. Lego Super Heroes aimed to recreate the main characters in Lego form, including DC Universe superheroes (Batman, Superman, Wonder Woman, the Joker, Bane, Harley Quinn and Lex Luthor) and Marvel Universe superheroes (Iron Man, The Hulk, Captain America, Thor, Hawkeye, Loki and Black Widow).

Lego Batman existed as its own franchise from 2006 to 2008 before the official Lego DC Universe Super Heroes (later Lego DC Super Heroes) brand name was launched in late 2011. Lego Spider-Man sets were first released in 2002 and 2003, based on the 2002 film and its sequel as part of the Lego Studios theme. Lego Marvel Super Heroes (later sometimes also marketed as Lego Marvel Avengers and Lego Marvel Studios: The Infinity Saga) sets based on the broader Marvel Comics universe and the Marvel Cinematic Universe were first launched in April 2012. Meanwhile, Lego The Incredibles was launched in June 2018 to feature alongside the 2018 animated film Incredibles 2.

Lego Batman and Lego Spider-Man sets released before the inception of the main theme in 2012 are retroactively considered to be part of Lego Super Heroes. Multiple video games and short films based on the theme were also released. Sets and figures of the theme also appear as a part of the Lego Minifigures theme, Lego Dimensions, Lego Juniors, Lego Duplo, Lego Disney, Lego Brick Sketches, Lego BrickHeadz and Lego Art. The Lego Group additionally also released two feature films featuring DC characters and a Batman adaption as well as associated Lego themes.

== Development ==
Lego DC Super Heroes was inspired by the DC Universe. The construction toy range was based on the DC Universe franchise and developed in collaboration with Warner Bros. Consumer Products. The construction sets were designed to recreate the story and characters of the DC Universe franchise in Lego form.

Lego Marvel Super Heroes was inspired by the Marvel Universe. The construction toy range was based on the Marvel franchise and developed in collaboration with Marvel Entertainment. The construction sets were designed to recreate the story and characters of the Marvel franchise in Lego form.

== Construction sets ==
According to BrickLink, The Lego Group released a total of 450 Lego sets and promotional polybags as part of Lego Super Heroes theme.

The first wave of sets released included nine sets from the DC Universe line. The largest of the sets was Arkham Asylum Breakout (set number: 10937) which included 1619 pieces and eight minifigures. In addition to the first release, two promotional polybags were also released under the DC Universe line, Batman Jetski (set number: 30160) and Batmobile (set number: 30161). Nine new sets were released later in 2012 under the Marvel Universe line.

Prior to the first wave of sets, Lego had given away five different minifigure promotional sets at comic conventions in the United States. At the 2011 San Diego Comic-Con, a Green Lantern minifigure and a Batman minifigure were given away to raffle winners and at New York Comic Con the same year, the minifigures of Green Lantern, Batman and Superman were given away at the DC Comics booth. In July 2012, four more exclusive minifigures were given at New York Comic Con to raffle winners - Shazam!, Phoenix, Bizarro and Symbiote Spider-Man. One year later, four more minifigures - Green Arrow, Black Man of Steel suit Superman, Spider-Woman, and The Amazing Spider-Man 2 suit Spider-Man were released at NYCC.

Lego have also released an accompanying magnet set under the Super Heroes theme. It is a three piece magnet set consisting of the Batman, Robin and The Joker minifigures each attached to a magnetized brick.

In November 2022, Lego designer Mark Stafford discussed the reason for less Lego DC sets in 2022 and explained, "At the moment. We are the Super Heroes team and would love to explore Marvel and DC. Personally, I hope we can get to the point of producing as many DC sets as we are Marvel. The reason for the current disparity between them is primarily to do with what children and parents are most familiar with."

=== DC Universe ===
==== Construction Figures ====
Three sets were released on 1 January 2012. They are 4526 Batman, 4527 The Joker, and 4528 Green Lantern, which were all buildable construction figures.

==== Comics ====
During San Diego Comic-Con 2012, exclusive Shazam and Bizarro minifigures were given away as part of a raffle draw.

During 2013's SDCC, Black Suit Superman and Green Arrow minifigures were given away. That same year, Toys "R" Us stores had The Joker's Mech minibuild available.

During SDCC 2014, Batman of Zur-En-Arrh was released as an exclusive minifigure given away to attendees. In the same year, Toys "R" Us stores had the Batman Bat Signal minibuild available.

During SDCC 2015, the exclusive Arsenal minifigure was given away to attendees. In addition, the exclusive Action Comics #1 Superman vignette set was also available, paying homage to the classic comic cover featuring Superman's debut.

In 2016, the 30604 Cosmic Boy polybag was released together with Lego DC Comics Super Heroes Justice League: Cosmic Clash (Blu-ray + DVD). In addition, Atom was released as an exclusive minifigure given away at SDCC 2016.

In 2017, the DC Comics Super Heroes Build Your Own Adventure book by Dorling-Kindersley was released, containing 11914 DC Comics Super Heroes Build Your Own Adventure parts and an exclusive John Stewart Green Lantern minifigure. Furthermore, an exclusive Vixen minifigure was given away at SDCC 2017.

During SDCC 2018, the exclusive 75996 Aquaman and Storm promotional set was available to attendees. In addition, an exclusive Black Lightning minifigure was released to convention attendees as well.

During SDCC 2019, the event exclusive 77903 The Dark Knight of Gotham City vignette set was available to commemorate 80 Years of Batman. An exclusive Zebra Batman minifigure was also released for the event. In addition, since 2019, various DC Universe minifigures ranging from Batman and Superman to The Joker and The Penguin were released as magazine gifts with the Lego DC Magazine.

Based on the Supergirl TV series, an event exclusive Supergirl minifigure was released exclusively through a DC FanDome 2020 raffle. In addition, a limited 77906 Wonder Woman was also released in conjunction with DC FanDome exclusively on Lego's official online store in the US and Canada. These exclusives were originally made for SDCC 2020, but were repurposed in the wake of the COVID-19 pandemic.

==== Batman ====
Five sets were released on 1 January 2012. They are 6857 The Dynamic Duo Funhouse Escape, 6858 Catwoman Catcycle City Chase, 6860 The Batcave, 6863 Batwing Battle Over Gotham City, and 6864 Batmobile and the Two-Face Chase. In addition, 30160 Batman Jetski and the microscale 30161 Batmobile were released as promotions in 2012.

On 1 January 2013 (first sold on 28 December 2012), 10937 Batman: Arkham Asylum Breakout, and 76000 Artic Batman vs. Mr. Freeze: Aquaman on Ice were released, with the 30166 Robin and Redbird Cycle polybag released as a promotion.

Three sets were released on 4 January 2014. They are 76010 Batman: The Penguin Face off, 76011 Batman: Man-Bat Attack and 76012 Batman: The Riddler Chase. Later, on 18 February, 76013 Batman: The Joker Steam Roller was released. In addition, microscale 30301 Batwing polybag was released as a promotion.

On 1 January 2015, 30303 The Joker Bumper Car was released as a promotional polybag. Later, two sets were released on August 2 (first on June 1). They are 76034 Batboat Harbour Pursuit and 76035 Jokerland. Both sets were also alternatively rereleased together as 5004816 Super Heroes DC Collection on 22 August.

On 1 March 2016, 76053 Gotham City Cycle Chase was released. Later, three sets namely 76054 Batman: Scarecrow Harvest of Fear, 76055 Batman: Killer Croc Sewer Smash and 76056 Batman: Rescue from Ra's al Ghul were released in June–August. In addition, 30606 Nightwing was released as a promotion the same year.

Three sets were released on 1 August 2018. They are 76110 Batman: The Attack of the Talons, 76111 Batman: Brother Eye Takedown and 76112 App-Controlled Batmobile.

Two sets were released on 1–2 January 2019. They are 76116 Batman Batsub and the Underwater Clash, and 76117 Batman Mech vs. Poison Ivy Mech. Later, on 12 June, a total of 6 more sets were first released. They are 76118 Mr. Freeze Batcycle Battle, 76119 Batmobile: Pursuit of The Joker, 76120 Batwing and The Riddler Heist and 76122 Batcave Clayface Invasion, as well as the Lego Juniors sets 76137 Batman vs. The Riddler Robbery and 76138 Batman and The Joker Escape. These sets were made available to the US and Canada on later dates, July 1 and August 2.

Three sets were released on 1 June 2020, then on 24 August for the US and Canada. They are 76158 Batboat The Penguin Pursuit!, 76159 Joker's Trike Chase, and 76160 Mobile Bat Base.

On 1 January 2021, the 40453 Batman vs. The Penguin & Harley Quinn blister pack was first released. Later, on 26 April, Lego Juniors set 76180 Batman vs. The Joker: Batmobile Chase and 76182 Batman Cowl were also released, though the latter was first released on April 2 in the US and Canada.

In 2022, 76220 Batman versus Harley Quinn was released on 1 October 2022. The set consists of 42 pieces and 2 minifigures of Batman and Harley Quinn.

In 2023, 76264 Batmobile Pursuit: Batman vs The Joker was released on 1 August 2023. The set consists of only 54 pieces and 2 minifigures of Batman (With a new molded cowl) and an exclusive Joker.

==== Superman ====
On 1 January 2012, 6862 Superman vs. Power Armor Lex was released. In addition, 30164 Lex Luthor was released as a promotion with preorders of the video game Lego Batman 2: DC Super Heroes.

In 2018, the 30614 Lex Luthor polybag was released as a promotion.

==== The Dark Knight Trilogy ====
At the New York Comic Con, in October 2011, a promotional Batman minifigure based on the trilogy was given away at the DC comics booth.

76001 The Bat vs. Bane: Tumbler Chase, based on The Dark Knight Rises film, was first released on 29 December 2012, and launched three days later.

D2C set 76023 The Tumbler based on The Dark Knight film was released on 24 December 2014. In addition, the microscale 30300 The Batman Tumbler polybag was released as a promotion.

In June 2015, 5004590 Bat-Pod had a limited release as a VIP members' competition prize.

76239 Batmobile Tumbler: Scarecrow Showdown and the D2C set 76240 Batmobile Tumbler were released on 3 September 2021, based on the trilogy.

==== DC Extended Universe ====
Three sets based on the Man of Steel film were released on 28 April 2013. They are 76002 Superman Metropolis Showdown, 76003 Superman: Battle of Smallville, and 76009 Superman: Black Zero Escape. In addition, a 5001623 Jor-El polybag was released as a promotion.

Three sets based on the Batman v Superman: Dawn of Justice film were released on 1–2 January 2016. They are 76044 Clash of the Heroes, 76045 Kryptonite Interception and 76046 Heroes of Justice: Sky High Battle. In addition, the microscale 30446 The Batmobile polybag was released as a promotion.

76075 Wonder Woman Warrior Battle, based on the Wonder Woman film, was released on 1–2 May 2017.

Three sets based on the Justice League film were released on 1 August 2017. They are 76085 Battle of Atlantis, 76086 Knightcrawler Tunnel Attack and 76087 Flying Fox: Batmobile Airlift Attack. Additional sets were also released as a part of the Lego BrickHeadz theme. Subsequently, another set 853744 Knightmare Batman Accessory Set was first released on 1 August 2018.

76095 Black Manta Strike, based on the Aquaman film was released on 1 August 2018.

The promotional polybag 30623 SHAZAM!, based on the Shazam! film was released in 2019.

76157 Wonder Woman vs. Cheetah, based on the Wonder Woman 1984 film, was released on 27 April 2020.

==== Batman Classic TV Series ====
At SDCC 2014, Batman Classic TV Series Batmobile, based on Batman (TV series) was released exclusively for purchase to convention attendees.

76052 Batman Classic TV Series - Batcave, based on the TV series, was released on 1 March 2016. In addition, a 30603 Batman Classic TV Series - Mr. Freeze polybag was released as a promotion.

76188 Batman Classic TV Series Batmobile was released based on the vehicle from the TV series on 26 April 2021.

76238 Classic TV Series Batman Cowl was released on October 1 the same year, based on Batman from the TV series.

==== Justice League ====
In 2014, 5002126 Martian Manhunter and 5004081 Plastic Man were polybags released as promotion for qualifying purchases and pre-orders of the video game Lego Batman 3: Beyond Gotham respectively.

Based on the Justice League from DC Comics Super Heroes, 76025 Green Lantern vs. Sinestro, 76026 Gorilla Grodd Goes Bananas, 76027 Black Manta Deep Sea Strike, 76028 Darkseid Invasion and 76040 Brainiac Attack were released on 1 January 2015.

In 2018, 76096 Superman & Krypto Team-Up, 76097 Lex Luthor Mech Takedown and 76098 Speed Force Freeze Pursuit was released on 11 January.

==== Mighty Micros ====
Three sets were released on 1 March 2016. They are 76061 Mighty Micros: Batman vs. Catwoman, 76062 Mighty Micros: Robin vs. Bane, and 76063 Mighty Micros: The Flash vs. Captain Cold. These 3 Mighty Micros were also released together as 66545 Mighty Micros Mighty Pack 3 in 1.

Three sets were released on 2 January 2017. They are 76068 Mighty Micros: Superman vs. Bizarro, 76069 Mighty Micros: Batman vs. Killer Moth, and 76070 Mighty Micros: Wonder Woman vs. Doomsday.

Three sets were released on 12 October 2018. They are 76092 Mighty Micros: Batman vs. Harley Quinn, 76093 Mighty Micros: Nightwing vs. The Joker, and 76094 Mighty Micros: Supergirl vs. Brainiac.

==== Batman 1989 ====
76139 1989 Batmobile, based on the Batman (1989 film), was released on 30 November 2019. In addition, 40433 1989 Batmobile - Limited Edition was released on 29 November as well.

On 1 November 2020, the 76161 1989 Batwing, based on Batman 1989 as well, was subsequently released, after being first available on Lego's website since 22 October.

In 2023, 76252 Batcave Shadow Box, based on the Batman Returns, will be released on 8 June 2023. Addition, two sets were released on 1 August 2023. The two sets are 76224 Batmobile: Batman vs The Joker Chase and 76265 Batwing: Batman vs The Joker.

==== The Batman ====
In conjunction with The Batman (film), Lego released four movie tie-in sets on 1 November 2021, namely 76179 Batman & Selina Kyle Motorcycle Pursuit, 76181 Batmobile: The Penguin Chase, 76183: Batcave: The Riddler Face-Off as well as 42127 The Batman - Batmobile under the Lego Technic theme.

==== Batman Forever ====
On 1 August 2025, the 76304 Batman Forever Batmobile was released.

=== Marvel Universe ===
The Marvel Universe sets were first released in 2012. Four The Avengers sets and one X-Men set were released in March, followed by one Ultimate Spider-Man set in August. 2013 saw a much smaller selection available, with two Ultimate Spider-Man sets released in January, followed by three Iron Man 3 sets in March. All of the older sets have now been retired by Lego.

==== Constraction ====
Three sets were released on 4 May 2012. They are 4529 Iron Man, 4530 The Hulk, and 4597 Captain America.

==== Comics ====
6866 Wolverine's Chopper Showdown, based on the X-Men comics, was released on 9 April 2012.

For the 2012 International Toy Fair in New York, USA, exclusively limited comic book variant minifigures of Iron Man and Captain America (Bucky Barnes) were given out as promotional material, as well as competition prizes to promote the Lego Super Hero Movie Maker app.

Captain America's Shield was available as an in-store build at Toys "R" Us in 2014.

76022 X-Men vs. The Sentinel was released on 3 June 2014.

Three sets were released on 17 February 2017. They are 76076 Captain America Jet Pursuit, 76077 Iron Man: Detroit Steel Strikes, and 76078 Hulk vs. Red Hulk.

30610 Giant Man Hank Pym, a promotional polybag was released alongside the video game Lego Marvel Super Heroes 2 Deluxe Edition in 2017.

76245 Ghost Rider Mech & Bike was released on 1 January 2023.

For San Diego Comic-Con, various Marvel minifigures have been given away over the years, exclusively available to convention attendees. These include the likes of Phoenix, Spider-Man in Black Symbiote Costume (2012), Spider-Woman (2013), All New Captain America (Sam Wilson) (2015), Steve Rogers Captain America (2016), Deadpool Duck (2017), and Sheriff Deadpool (2018) have been made and given out as event exclusive promotional merchandise across different conventions held each year. There have also been instances of non-comic based minifigures or sets given out or available for purchase.

==== Ultimate Spider-Man ====
6873 Spider-Man's Doc Ock Ambush, based on the Ultimate Spider-Man TV series, was first released on 24 July 2012.

Two sets were released on 3 January 2013. They are 76004 Spider-Man: Spider-Cycle Chase, and 76005 Spider-Man: Daily Bugle Showdown.

Three sets were released on 18 February 2014. They are 76014 Spider-Trike vs. Electro, 76015 Doc Ock Truck Heist and 76016 Spider-Helicopter Rescue. In addition, a 30302 Spider-Man polybag was released as a promotion.

Two sets were released on 2 August 2015. They are 76036 Carnage's Shield Sky Attack, and 76037 Rhino and Sandman Super Villain Team-up. In addition, a 30305 Spider-Man Super Jumper polybag was released as a promotion.

In 2016, a 30448 Spider-Man vs. The Venom Symbiote polybag was released as a promotion.

==== The Avengers ====
Four sets based on The Avengers film were released on 9 April 2012. They are 6865 Captain America's Avenging Cycle, 6867 Loki's Cosmic Cube Escape, 6868 Hulk's Helicarrier Breakout, and 6869 Quinjet Aerial Battle. In addition, four polybags namely the microscale 30162 Quinjet, 30163 Thor and the Cosmic Cube, 30165 Hawkeye with Equipment, and 5000022 The Hulk were released as promotions. In 2013, the 30167 Iron Man vs. Fighting Drone polybag was also released as a promotion.

Six sets based on the Avengers: Age of Ultron film were released on 1 March 2015. They are 76029 Iron Man vs. Ultron, 76030 Avengers Hydra Showdown, 76031 The Hulk Buster Smash, 76032 The Avengers Quinjet City Chase, 76038 Attack on Avengers Tower, and 76041 The Hydra Fortress Smash. In addition, the microscale 30304 The Avengers Quinjet, 5002946 Silver Centurion, and 5003084 The Hulk polybags were released as promotions. For San Diego Comic-Con in 2015, Throne of Ultron was released as an event exclusive set. Furthermore, the D2C set 76042 The S.H.I.E.L.D. Helicarrier was released on 7 March in the same year. Later on, 76105 The Hulkbuster: Ultron Edition was released on 4 March 2018.

Six sets based on the Avengers: Infinity War film were released on 4 March 2018. They are 76101 Outrider Dropship Attack, 76102 Thor's Weapon Quest, 76103 Corvus Glaive Thresher Attack, 76104 The Hulkbuster Smash-Up, 76107 Thanos Ultimate Battle, and 76108 Sanctum Sanctorum Showdown. In addition, the microscale polybag 30525 The Guardians' Ship was released as a promotion. Additional sets were also released as a sub-brand of the Lego Brickheadz theme. Later in October, 5005256 Marvel Super Heroes Minifigure Collection was released as an exclusive promotional set only available in Toys "R" Us stores or its online store.

Five sets based on the Avengers: Endgame film were released on 1 April 2019. They are 76123 Captain America: Outriders Attack, 76124 War Machine Buster, 76125 Iron Man Hall of Armor, 76126 Avengers Ultimate Quinjet and 76131 Avengers Compound Battle. Later, 76144 Avengers Hulk Helicopter Rescue was released on 27 November. In addition, an 30452 Iron Man and Dum-E polybag was released as a promotion. Stormbreaker was available as an in-store build in 2019.

In 2019, the 40334 Avengers Tower promotional set was released, based on The Avengers film franchise.

Additional sets based on the films would later be a part of the Infinity Saga sets.

==== Iron Man 3 ====
Three sets based on the Iron Man 3 film were released on 7 March 2013. They are 76006 Iron Man: Extremis Sea Port Battle, 76007 Iron Man: Malibu Mansion Attack and 76008 Iron Man vs. The Mandarin: Ultimate Showdown. In addition, a 30168 Gun Mounting System polybag was released as a promotion with pre-orders of the Lego Marvel Super Heroes video game.

In August 2020, 76165 Iron Man Helmet was released, based on the Iron Man film. Additional sets based on the film would later be a part of the Infinity Saga sets.

==== The Amazing Spider-Man ====
For San Diego Comic-Con in 2013, an exclusive Spider-Man minifigure based on The Amazing Spider-Man film was given away as an event exclusive.

In 2014, the polybag 5002125 Electro was released as a promotion, based on The Amazing Spider-Man 2 film.

==== Avengers Assemble ====
Two sets based on the Avengers Assemble TV series were released on 18 February 2014. They are 76017 Avengers: Captain America vs. Hydra, and 76018 Avengers: Hulk Lab Smash.

Two more sets were released on 2 January 2016. They are 76048 Iron Skull Sub Attack, and 76049 Avenjet Space Mission.

==== Captain America: The Winter Soldier ====
In 2015, the polybag 5002943: Winter Soldier was released as a promotion, based on both the Captain America: The Winter Soldier film and Marvel comics.

==== Guardians of the Galaxy ====
Three sets based on the Guardians of the Galaxy film were released on 3 June 2014. They are 76019 Starblaster Showdown, 76020 Knowhere Escape Mission, and 76021 The Milano Spaceship Rescue. In addition, a 5002145 Rocket Raccoon polybag was released as a promotion. Furthermore, Rocket Racoon's Warbird, and The Collector were released as San Diego Comic-Con exclusives in 2014, as a limited retail set and giveaway minifigure.

Three sets based on the Guardians of the Galaxy Vol. 2 film were released on 17 February 2017. They are 76079 Ravager Attack, 76080 Ayesha's Revenge, and 76081 The Milano vs. The Abilisk. In addition, a microscale 30449 The Milano polybag was released as a promotion.

76231 Guardians of the Galaxy Advent Calendar, based on The Guardians of the Galaxy Holiday Special television special, was released on 1 September 2022. The set contains 268 pieces with 6 minifigures of Star-Lord, Groot, Drax, Mantis, Nebula and Rocket Raccoon.

76251 Star-Lord's Helmet will be released on 1 April 2023. The set contains 602 pieces.

Three sets based on the Guardians of the Galaxy Vol. 3 film were released on 1 April 2023. They are 76253 Guardians of the Galaxy Headquarters, 76254 Baby Rocket's Ship and 76255 The New Guardians’ Ship.

76249 Venomised Groot will be released on 1 August 2023. The set contains 630 pieces.

==== Ant-Man ====
76039 Ant-Man Final Battle, based on the Ant-Man film, was released on 1 June 2015.

76109 Quantum Realm Explorers, based on the Ant-Man and the Wasp film, was released on 2 June 2018. In addition, 75997 Ant-Man and the Wasp was released as an exclusive set to the 2018 San Diego Comic-Con.

76256 Ant-Man Construction Figure, based on the Ant-Man and the Wasp: Quantumania film was released on 1 May 2023.

==== Mighty Micros ====
Three sets were released on 1 March 2016. They are 76064 Mighty Micros: Spider-Man vs. Green Goblin, 76065 Mighty Micros: Captain America vs. Red Skull, and 76066 Mighty Micros: Hulk vs. Ultron.

Three sets were released on 2 January 2017. They are 76071 Mighty Micros: Spider-Man vs. Scorpion, 76072 Mighty Micros: Iron Man vs. Thanos, and 76073 Wolverine vs. Magneto.

Three sets were released on 1 January 2018. They are 76089 Mighty Micros: Scarlet Spider vs. Sandman, 76090 Mighty Micros: Star-Lord vs. Nebula, and 76091 Mighty Micros: Thor vs. Loki.

==== Captain America: Civil War ====
Three sets based on the Captain America: Civil War film were released on 1 March 2016. They are 76047 Black Panther Pursuit, 76050 Crossbones Hazard Heist, and 76051 Super Hero Airport Battle. Subsequently, 76067 Tanker Truck Takedown was released on 1 August as a Toys "R" Us exclusive. In addition, a 30447 Captain America's Motorcycle polybag was released as a promotion.

==== Doctor Strange ====
76060 Doctor Strange's Sanctum Sanctorum, based on the film Doctor Strange, was released on 1 August 2016.

76205 Gargantos Showdown, based on the film Doctor Strange in the Multiverse of Madness was released on 1 January 2022.

At the Lego Con 2022, the second Marvel modular 76218 Sanctum Sanctorum was revealed, and subsequently released on 1 August 2022. The set consists of 2708 pieces with 9 minifigures of Doctor Strange, Sinister Strange, Dead Strange, Wong, Iron Man, Spider-Man, The Scarlet Witch, Master Mordo and Ebony Maw.

==== Spider-Man ====
Three sets were released on 1 August 2016. They are 76057 Spider-Man: Web Warriors Ultimate Bridge Battle, 76058 Spider-Man: Ghost Rider Team-Up, and 76059 Spider-Man: Doc Ock's Tentacle Trap.

Five sets were released on 25 November 2018. They are 76113 Spider-Man Bike Rescue, 76114 Spider-Man's Spider Crawler, 76115 Spider Mech vs. Venom, and Juniors sets 76133 Spider-Man Car Chase and 76134 Spider-Man: Doc Ock Diamond Heist.

In 2019, the 30451 Spider-Man's Mini Spider Crawler polybag was released as a promotion.

Five sets were released on 2 January 2020. They are 76146 Spider-Man Mech, 76147 Vulture's Trucker Robbery, 76148 Spider-Man vs. Doc Ock, 76149 The Menace of Mysterio, and 76150 Spiderjet vs. Venom Mech. Later, two sets were released on 3 July. They are 76151 Venomosaurus Ambush, and 76163 Venom Crawler.

In addition, since 2020, various Spider-Man minifigures ranging from Spider-Man and Venom to Iron Spider were released as magazine gifts with the Lego Avengers Magazine.

Five sets were released on 2 January 2021. They are 76171 Miles Morales Mech Armor, Juniors set 76172 Spider-Man and Sandman Showdown, 76173 Spider-Man and Ghost Rider vs. Carnage, 76174 Spider-Man's Monster Truck vs. Mysterio, and 76175 Attack on the Spider Lair.

Four sets were released subsequently in 2021. They are 40454 Spider-Man versus Venom and Iron Venom, 76187 Venom, 76198 Spider-Man & Doctor Octopus Mech Battle, and 76199 Carnage.

The first Marvel modular was released on 1 June 2021: 76178 Daily Bugle. It is currently the tallest of all licensed and unlicensed modular sets, measuring roughly 82 centimeters and is composed of 3772 bricks and pieces. The set includes 25 minifigures, including but not limited to Spider-Man, J. Jonah Jameson, Doctor Octopus, and Daredevil. The Daily Bugle Skyscraper comprises four stories (not including the roof), a newspaper stand, a "Spider-Buggy", and a taxi. Rooms in the Daily Bugle depict a lobby, an editor's bullpen, a storage room, as well as Jameson's office, and Brant's secretarial desk. On one of the floors, there is a reference to a meme originating from Spider-Man (1967 TV series). Littered throughout the playset are newspapers referencing several Marvel characters, such as Norman Osborn, Morbius the Living Vampire, Kingpin, The Lizard, J. Jonah Jameson III, and several more. This is one of the first modular buildings to include alleyways. The third story displays a window that is severely damaged caused by the Green Goblin.

76219 Spider-Man & Green Goblin Mech Battle was released on 1 April 2022. The set consists of 296 pieces and 2 minifigures of Spider-Man and Green Goblin.

76225 Miles Morales, 76226 Spider-Man, and 76230 Venom were released on 1 August 2022.

76244 Miles Morales vs. Morbius was released on 1 January 2023.

==== Spider-Man: Homecoming ====
Two sets based on the Spider-Man: Homecoming film were released on 2 June 2017. They are 76082 ATM Heist Battle, and 76083 Beware the Vulture.

Three sets based on the Spider-Man: Far From Home film were released on 22 April 2019. They are 76128 Molten Man Battle, 76129 Hydro-Man Attack, and 76130 Stark Jet and the Drone Attack. Later, an exclusive 40343 Spider-Man and the Museum Break-In set was released on 12 June.

Three sets inspired by all three films from the trilogy was released in 2021 in conjunction with the Spider-Man: No Way Home film. They are 76184 Spider-Man vs. Mysterio's Drone Attack, 76185 Spider-Man at the Sanctum Workshop and 76195 Spider-Man's Drone Duel. In addition, the promotional polybag set 30443 Spider-Man Bridge Battle was released in 2022. 76261 Spider-Man Final Battle was released on 1 August 2023.

==== Thor: Ragnarok ====
Two sets based on the Thor: Ragnarok film were released on 1 August 2017. They are 76084 The Ultimate Battle For Asgard, and 76088 Thor vs. Hulk: Arena Clash.

Two sets based on the Thor: Love and Thunder film were released on 26 April 2022. They are 76207 Attack on New Asgard, and 76208 The Goat Boat. In total, the set includes 5 minifigures of Thor, Jane Foster/Mighty Thor, Valkyrie, Korg and Gorr the God Butcher.

==== Black Panther ====
Two sets based on the Black Panther film were released on 1 January 2018. They are 76099 Rhino Face-Off by the Mine, and 76100 Royal Talon Fighter Attack. In addition, a microscale 30450 Royal Talon Fighter polybag was released as a promotion.

Four sets based on the Black Panther: Wakanda Forever film were released on 1 October 2022. They are 76211 Shuri's Sunbird, 76212 Shuri's Lab, 76213 King Namor's Throne Room, and 76214 War on the Water.

The D2C bust 76215 Black Panther, based on T'Challa's Panther Habit, was released on 1 October 2022, consisting of 2961 pieces.

==== Marvel's Spider-Man ====
For San Diego Comic-Con in 2019, PS4 Spider-Man was released as an event exclusive, based on the Spider-Man video game by Insomniac Games.

Produced as an exclusive for the cancelled 2020 San Diego Comic-Con, Classic Suit Miles Morales was instead released as part of a sweepstakes in October, based on the Spider-Man: Miles Morales video game by Insomniac Games.

==== Captain Marvel ====
76127 Captain Marvel and The Skrull Attack, based on the Captain Marvel film, was released on 2 January 2019. For the 2019 San Diego Comic-Con, 77902 Captain Marvel and the Asis was released as an event exclusive. Furthermore, Mini Captain Marvel Ship was available as an in-store build at Toys "R" Us the same year. In 2020, a 30453 Captain Marvel and Nick Fury polybag was released as a promotion.

76232 The Hoopty, based on The Marvels film, will be released on 1 October 2023.

==== Avengers ====
Four sets based on the Avengers were released on 2 January 2020. They are 76140 Iron Man Mech, 76141 Thanos Mech, 76142 Avengers Speeder Bike Attack, and 76143 Avengers Truck Take-down.

On 1 June 2020, 40418 Falcon & Black Widow Team-Up was released.

Later, five more sets were released on 3 July the same year. They are Juniors set 76152 Avengers Wrath of Loki, 76153 Avengers Helicarrier, 76164 Iron Man Hulkbuster versus A.I.M. Agent, 76155 Iron Man, and 76166 Avengers Tower Battle. On 24 August, 76167 Iron Man Armory was released.

In addition, since 2020, various Avengers minifigures ranging from Iron Man and Captain America to Captain Marvel and War Machine were released as magazine gifts with the Lego Avengers Magazine.

Three sets were released on 2 January 2021. They are 76168 Captain America Mech Armor, 76169 Thor Mech Armor, and Juniors set 76170 Iron Man vs. Thanos.

On 1 September 2021, 76196 The Avengers Advent Calendar, the first Marvel Advent Calendar, was released.

After an initial delay in January, 76203 Iron Man Mech Armor, and 76204 Black Panther Mech Armor were released on 1 April 2022.

76241 Hulk Mech Armor, 76242 Thanos Mech Armor, and 76243 Rocket Mech Armor were released on 1 January 2023.

76258 Captain America Construction Figure will be released in 2023.

==== Black Widow ====
76162 Black Widow's Helicopter Chase, based on the Black Widow film, was released on 1 March 2020. Later, 77905 Taskmaster's Ambush, which was only made available via Lego USA's website and online store, was released in October. It was originally made to be an SDCC exclusive, but was repurposed in light of the COVID-19 pandemic.

==== Shang-Chi and the Legend of the Ten Rings ====
Two sets, along with a promotional polybag, based on the Shang-Chi and the Legend of the Ten Rings film on 26 April 2021. These were 76176 Escape from The Ten Rings, 76177 Battle at the Ancient Village, and 30454 Shang-Chi and The Great Protector.

==== Infinity Saga ====
Eight sets based upon past films from the Infinity Saga were released throughout 2021. Six sets, namely 76186 Black Panther Dragon Flyer, 76189 Captain America and Hydra Face-Off, 76190 Iron Man: Iron Monger Mayhem, 76191 The Infinity Gauntlet, 76192 Avengers: Endgame Final Battle, and 76193 The Guardians' Ship, were released on 1 June 2021. Subsequently, 76200 Bro Thor's New Asgard was released on 1 August 2021, while 76237 Sanctuary II: Endgame Battle was released on 1 October 2021.

An additional eight sets based on the Infinity Saga were released throughout 2022. 76206 Iron Man Figure featuring Iron Man Mark XLIII from Avengers: Age of Ultron film was released on 1 January 2022. 76209 Thor's Hammer based on Thor film was released on 1 March 2022, consisting of 979 pieces with 1 minifigure of Thor as well as trinkets from Odin's Vault. The 40525 Endgame Battle accessory pack was released on 1 April 2022, including minifigures of Thor, Korg, Miek, Valkyrie and a Chitauri. 76216 Iron Man Armoury was released on 1 June 2022, consisting of 496 pieces with 8 minifigures of Tony Stark, Pepper Potts, Nick Fury, War Machine, Whiplash, and Iron Man suits MK3, MK25 and MK85. 76217 I am Groot was released on 1 June 2022, featuring a brick-built Baby Groot. The set contains 476 pieces which measures 26 cm tall. 76223 Nano Gauntlet was released on 1 August 2022, consisting of 675 pieces.

The largest Lego Super Heroes set to date, 76210 Hulkbuster will be released on 9 November 2022, based on the MK 44 Hulkbuster from Avengers: Age of Ultron film. The D2C set is over 52 cm tall and consists of 4049 pieces. The set includes an exclusive Tony Stark minifigure, and accommodates for the Iron Man Mark XLIII buildable figure from 76206 to be placed inside.

On 30 April 2022, Marvel confirmed that the Infinity Saga sub-theme has retired and replaced with Lego Legacy.

In 2023, 76247 The Hulkbuster: The Battle of Wakanda and 76248 The Avengers Quinjet were released on 1 January 2023. 76251 Star-Lord's helmet was released in February 2023. 76260 Black Widow & Captain America Motorcycles will be released in 2023. 30652 Doctor Strange's Interdimensional Portal polybag set was released in 2023. 76263 Iron Man Hulkbuster vs. Thanos and 76266 Endgame Final Battle were be released on 1 August 2023. 76262 Captain America's Shield will be released on 1 August 2023.

In November 2023, 76269 Avengers Tower will be released on 24 November 2023.

==== What If...? ====
Two sets based on the What If...? series were released in 2021. They are 76194 Tony Stark's Sakaarian Iron Man, and 76201 Captain Carter & The Hydra Stomper.

==== Eternals ====
Four sets based on the Eternals film were launched in 2021 to feature alongside the film's release. Namely, 76145 Eternals' Aerial Assault, 76154 Deviant Ambush!, 76155 In Arishem's Shadow, and 76156 Rise of the Domo.

==== Spidey and His Amazing Friends ====
Four sets based on the children's television series Spidey and His Amazing Friends were released in January 2022. They are 10781 Spider-Man's Techno Trike, 10782 Hulk vs. Rhino Truck Showdown, 10783 Spider-Man at Doc Ock's Lab, and 10784 Spider-Man Webquarters Hangout.

In 2023, three sets were released on 1 March 2023. The sets named 10789 Spider-Man's Car and Doc Ock, 10790 Team Spidey at Green Goblin's Lighthouse and 10791 Team Spidey's Mobile Headquarters.

==== X-Men '97 ====
After an initial delay in January, 76202 Wolverine Mech Armor, based on the Marvel comics character of the same name, was released on 1 April 2022, marking the first X-Men retail set since 2014 and third overall.

In 2023, 76257 Wolverine Construction Figure will be released on 1 June 2023.

In July 2023, Wolverine's Adamantium Claws (set number: 76250) will be released on 1 August 2023.

=== Pixar's The Incredibles ===
Three sets based on the Incredibles 2 film were released on 21 April 2018. They are 10759 Elastigirl's Rooftop Pursuit, 10760 Underminer's Bank Heist, and 10761 The Great Home Escape. In addition, an 30615 Edna Mode polybag was released as a promotion. Each of the sets featured the five core characters: Mr. Incredible, Mrs. Incredible, Violet Parr, Dashiell 'Dash' Parr and Jack-Jack.

Other characters and character variants (Mr. Incredible, Syndrome, Frozone, Edna Mode etc.) have also been released in Lego Minifigures The Lego Disney Series 1 and 2.

=== Lego Minifigures ===
In 2016, 71012 Disney Series 1 was released, with 2 minifigures from The Incredibles franchise: Mr. Incredible and Syndrome. In 2019, a follow-up 71024 Disney Series 2 was released with Edna Mode and Frozone.

In 2017, 71017 The Lego Batman Movie Series 1 was released, based on The Lego Batman Movie film, with a total of 20 minifigures. A follow-up was released in 2018 in 71020 The Lego Batman Movie Series 2, with a total of 20 minifigures.

In 2020, 71026 DC Super Heroes Series was released, based on DC Comics, with a total of 16 minifigures.

In 2021, 71031 Marvel Studios Series 1 was released, based on the Marvel Cinematic Universe Disney+ series WandaVision, The Falcon and the Winter Soldier, Loki and What If...?, with a total of 12 minifigures.

In 2023, 71039 Marvel Collectible Minifigure Series 2 was released on 1 September 2023 based on Marvel Cinematic Universe Disney+ series Hawkeye, Moon Knight, She-Hulk: Attorney at Law, Werewolf by Night, Echo, Agatha All Along, What If...? and X-Men: The Animated Series with a total of 12 minifigures.

=== Lego Brick Sketches sets ===
Lego released the 40386 Batman and 40428 The Joker under the Lego Brick Sketches theme on 1 June 2020.

Lego released the 40535 Iron Man and 40536 Miles Morales under the Lego Brick Sketches theme on 1 April 2022.

=== Lego Art sets ===
Lego released the 31199 Marvel Studios Iron Man under the Lego Art theme on 1 August 2020.

Lego released the 31205 Jim Lee Batman Collection under the Lego Art theme on 1 March 2022.

Lego released the 31209 The Amazing Spider-Man under the Lego Art theme on 1 August 2023.

== TV specials, short films and movies ==
=== DC ===
==== Lego Batman: The Movie – DC Super Heroes Unite (2013) ====
Lego Batman: The Movie – DC Super Heroes Unite is an animated film based on the video game Lego Batman 2: DC Super Heroes. It encompasses most cutscenes from the game, while the gameplay was replaced by new scenes. The film was released on Blu-ray and DVD on 21 May 2013, and received generally positive reviews, with praise for the animation and action, although the promotional tone of the film was criticized.

Archive recordings and new recordings were provided by Troy Baker as Batman, Two-Face, and Brainiac, Charlie Schlatter as Robin and Flash, Travis Willingham as Superman, Christopher Corey Smith as Joker, Clancy Brown as Lex Luthor, Laura Bailey as Poison Ivy, Harley Quinn, and Wonder Woman, Rob Paulsen as Riddler, Steve Blum as Bane and Penguin, Cam Clarke as Green Lantern and Martian Manhunter, Brian Bloom as Cyborg, Townsend Coleman as Commissioner Gordon, and Katherine Von Till as Catwoman and Batcomputer.

==== Lego DC Comics Super Heroes: Batman Be-Leaguered (2014) ====
Lego DC Comics Super Heroes: Batman Be-Leaguered is an animated short film. It premiered on Cartoon Network on October 27, 2014, and is the second Lego DC Comics film following Lego Batman: The Movie – DC Super Heroes Unite. The film was released on DVD with Lego DC Comics Super Heroes: Justice League vs. Bizarro League in 2015.

The voice cast consists of Troy Baker as Batman, Dee Bradley Baker as Aquaman and Man-Bat, Grey DeLisle as Lois Lane and Wonder Woman, John DiMaggio as Joker and Lex Luthor, Tom Kenny as Penguin, Nolan North as Superman and Alfred Pennyworth, Khary Payton as Cyborg, Paul Reubens as Bat-Mite, Kevin Michael Richardson as Black Manta and Captain Cold, and James Arnold Taylor as Flash.

==== Lego DC Comics Super Heroes: Justice League vs. Bizarro League (2015) ====
Lego DC Comics Super Heroes: Justice League vs. Bizarro League is an animated film. It was released on February 10, 2015, on Blu-ray and DVD. This is the third Lego DC Comics film following Lego Batman: The Movie – DC Super Heroes Unite and Lego DC Comics: Batman Be-Leaguered.

Some voice actors from various DC properties reprise their respective roles and some new roles, including Troy Baker as Batman and Batzarro, Nolan North as Superman and Bizarro, Khary Payton as Cyborg and Cyzarro, Diedrich Bader as Green Lantern (Guy Gardner) and Greenzarro, John DiMaggio as Lex Luthor and Deathstroke, Tom Kenny as Penguin and Plastic Man, and Kevin Michael Richardson as Captain Cold and Gorilla Grodd. The rest of the voice cast consists of Phil Morris as Green Arrow and Hawkman, Tony Todd as Darkseid, Kari Wahlgren as Wonder Woman and Bizarra, and April Winchell as Giganta.

The film received negative reviews from critics, with criticisms focusing on the silly and promotional tone and the characters, although the animation was praised.

==== Lego DC Comics Super Heroes: Justice League – Attack of the Legion of Doom (2015) ====
Lego DC Comics Super Heroes: Justice League – Attack of the Legion of Doom is an animated film. It was released on August 25, 2015, on Blu-ray, DVD, and Digital HD. This is the fourth Lego DC Comics film following Lego Batman: The Movie – DC Super Heroes Unite, Lego DC Comics: Batman Be-Leaguered and Lego DC Comics Super Heroes: Justice League vs. Bizarro League.

Voice actors from various (also copyrighted) DC properties reprise their respective roles, including Troy Baker as Batman, Mark Hamill as Trickster while also voicing Sinestro, Nolan North as Superman, Khary Payton as Cyborg, Dee Bradley Baker as Man-Bat while also voicing Martian Manhunter, John DiMaggio as Joker, Josh Keaton as Green Lantern, Kevin Michael Richardson as Black Manta and Gorilla Grodd, Grey Griffin as Lois Lane and Wonder Woman, James Arnold Taylor as Flash while also voicing Sam Lane, Tom Kenny as Penguin, and Tony Todd as Darkseid. Cree Summer also voices Cheetah here.

The film received generally positive reviews, with praise for the animation, action, and humor, although some criticized the consumerism in the film.

==== Lego DC Comics Super Heroes: Justice League – Cosmic Clash (2016) ====
Lego DC Comics Super Heroes: Justice League – Cosmic Clash is an animated film. It was released on February 9, 2016, on Digital HD and March 1 on Blu-ray and DVD. It is the fifth Lego DC Comics film following Lego Batman: The Movie – DC Super Heroes Unite, Lego DC Comics: Batman Be-Leaguered, Lego DC Comics Super Heroes: Justice League vs. Bizarro League and Lego DC Comics Super Heroes: Justice League – Attack of the Legion of Doom.

Some voice actors from various DC properties reprised their respective roles, including Troy Baker as Batman, Nolan North as Superman, Grey DeLisle as Wonder Woman, Andy Milder as Garth Ranzz, Phil Morris as Vandal Savage, Khary Payton as Cyborg, James Arnold Taylor as Flash, and Kari Wahlgren as Saturn Girl. The rest of the cast consists of Jessica DiCicco as Supergirl, Josh Keaton as Green Lantern, Phil LaMarr as Brainiac, Yuri Lowenthal as Cosmic Boy, and Jason Spisak as Captain Fear.

The film received positive reviews, with critics deeming it superior to past films in the Lego DC Comics film series.

==== Lego DC Comics Super Heroes: Justice League – Gotham City Breakout (2016) ====
Lego DC Comics Super Heroes: Justice League – Gotham City Breakout is an animated film. It was released on June 21, 2016, in Digital HD and July 12 on Blu-ray and DVD.

Some voice actors from various DC properties reprise their respective roles, including Troy Baker as Batman, Grey DeLisle as Wonder Woman, John DiMaggio as Deathstroke while also voicing Scarecrow, Tom Kenny as Penguin, Nolan North as Superman, Khary Payton as Cyborg, Tara Strong as Harley Quinn, and Hynden Walch as Starfire. The rest of the cast consists of Eric Bauza as Bane and Commissioner Gordon, Will Friedle as Nightwing, Amy Hill as Madame Mantis, Sarah Hyland as Batgirl, Vanessa Marshall as Vanessa Marshall as Poison Ivy, Scott Menville as Robin (Damian Wayne), and Jason Spisak as Joker and Grundle.

The film received positive reviews, with praise for the action, although the consumerism was criticized.

==== The Lego Batman Movie (2017) ====
The Lego Batman Movie is a 2017 animated superhero comedy film and distributed by Warner Bros. Pictures. It was directed by Chris McKay and written by Seth Grahame-Smith, Chris McKenna, Erik Sommers, Jared Stern, and John Whittington, and produced by Dan Lin, Roy Lee, and Phil Lord and Christopher Miller. Based on the Lego Batman toy line, the film is an international co-production of the United States, Australia, and Denmark, the first spin-off installment of The Lego Movie film series and the second installment overall. The story centers on the DC Comics character Batman as he attempts to overcome his greatest fear to stop the Joker's latest plan. The film features Will Arnett reprising his role as Batman from The Lego Movie alongside Zach Galifianakis, Michael Cera, Rosario Dawson, and Ralph Fiennes.

The Lego Batman Movie had its world premiere in Dublin, Ireland on January 29, 2017, and was released in the United States on February 10. The film was released in 3D, RealD 3D, Dolby Cinema, IMAX, IMAX 3D and 4DX. The film received generally positive reviews from critics for its animation, voice acting, soundtrack, visual style, and humor, and was also commercially successful, having grossed $312 million worldwide against a budget of $80 million.

A sequel was announced in 2018, but with Universal Pictures acquiring the rights to The Lego Movie franchise, it is unknown if it will still be produced.

==== Lego DC Comics Super Heroes: The Flash (2018) ====
Lego DC Comics Super Heroes: The Flash is an animated film. It was released digitally on February 13, 2018, and was released on DVD and Blu-ray on March 13. It is the seventh Lego DC Comics film. This is the first posthumous release for longtime DC producer Benjamin Melniker, who died a month before its release. The film received positive reviews from critics, who praised the action, humor, and animation.

The voice cast consists of James Arnold Taylor as Flash, Dee Bradley Baker as Aquaman and Captain Boomerang, Troy Baker as Batman, Eric Bauza as Atom, B'Dg, and Jimmy Olsen, Grey DeLisle as Lois Lane and Wonder Woman, Tom Kenny as Penguin and Plastic Man, Phil LaMarr as Firestorm, Vanessa Marshall as Poison Ivy, Kate Micucci as Zatanna, Nolan North as Superman and Killer Croc, Khary Payton as Cyborg, Kevin Michael Richardson as Captain Cold and Doctor Fate, Dwight Schultz as Reverse-Flash, Jason Spisak as Joker, and Audrey Wasilewski as Mayor Wimbley.

==== Lego DC Comics Super Heroes: Aquaman – Rage of Atlantis (2018) ====
Lego DC Comics Super Heroes: Aquaman – Rage of Atlantis is an animated film. It premiered at San Diego Comic-Con on July 22, 2018 and was released digitally, DVD and Blu-ray on July 31. It is the eighth Lego DC Comics film.

The voice cast consists of Dee Bradley Baker as Aquaman and Dex-Starr, Jonathan Adams as Atrocitus, Troy Baker as Batman, Eric Bauza as Jimmy Olsen, Grey DeLisle as Wonder Woman and Power Ring, Trevor Devall as Ocean Master, Susan Eisenberg as Mera, Scott Menville as Robin, Cristina Milizia as Green Lantern (Jessica Cruz), Nolan North as Superman, Khary Payton as Cyborg, Alyson Stoner as Batgirl, and Fred Tatasciore as Lobo.

The film received mixed reviews, with praise for the animation but criticism for the consumerism.

==== Lego DC Batman: Family Matters (2019) ====
Lego DC Batman: Family Matters is an animated film. It premiered at San Diego Comic-Con on July 21, 2019, and was released on DVD, Blu-ray, and Digital on August 20. It is the ninth Lego DC Comics film. The DVD release includes a free 84-piece Lego set.

The voice cast consists of Troy Baker as Batman, Steve Blum as Scarecrow, Zach Callison as Billy Batson, Cam Clarke as Brother Eye and Batcomputer, Will Friedle as Nightwing, Ralph Garman as the Wizard, Tom Kenny as Commissioner Gordon and Penguin, Christian Lanz as Two-Face, Scott Menville as Robin, Nolan North as Alfred Pennyworth and Killer Croc, André Sogliuzzo as Riddler, Jason Spisak as Red Hood, Alyson Stoner as Batgirl, Tara Strong as Batwoman, and Fred Tatasciore as Solomon Grundy.

The film received positive reviews, with praise for the humor and action, although the consumerism was criticized.

==== Lego DC Shazam! Magic and Monsters (2020) ====
Lego DC Shazam! Magic and Monsters is an animated film. It was released on digital on April 28, 2020, and on Blu-ray and DVD on June 16.

The voice cast consists of Sean Astin as Shazam, Dee Bradley Baker as Doctor Sivana, a Crocodile-Man, and Jeepers, Troy Baker as Batman and Carmine Falcone, Zach Callison as Billy Batson, Grey DeLisle as Wonder Woman and Lois Lane, Greg Ellis as Mister Mind, Ralph Garman as the Wizard, Jennifer Hale as Mary Batson and L.N. Ambassador, Tom Kenny as Penguin and Perry White, Cristina Milizia as Green Lantern, Nolan North as Superman and Alfred Pennyworth, Fred Tatasciore as Lobo and Oom, James Arnold Taylor as Flash and Dummy, and Imari Williams as Black Adam.

The film received positive reviews from critics, with praise for the humor and action.

=== Marvel ===
==== Lego Marvel Super Heroes: Maximum Overload (2013) ====
Lego Marvel Super Heroes: Maximum Overload is a five-part animated Lego short film. It premiered on YouTube on November 5, 2013.

The voice cast consists of Laura Bailey as Black Widow, Dee Bradley Baker as Venom and a Chitauri, Troy Baker as Loki, Drake Bell as Spider-Man, Steve Blum as Wolverine, Greg Cipes as Iron Fist, Grey DeLisle as Pepper Potts, Barry Dennen as Mandarin, Robin Atkin Downes as Abomination, Tom Kenny as Doctor Octopus, Stan Lee as a hot dog vendor, Chi McBride as Nick Fury and Red Skull, Adrian Pasdar as Iron Man, Bumper Robinson as Falcon, J.K. Simmons as J. Jonah Jameson, Roger Craig Smith as Captain America, Fred Tatasciore as Hulk, and Travis Willingham as Thor.

==== Lego Marvel Super Heroes: Avengers Reassembled! (2015) ====
Lego Marvel Super Heroes: Avengers Reassembled! is an animated Lego short film. It is a re-imagined retelling of the film Avengers: Age of Ultron. The film aired on Disney XD.

The voice cast consists of Laura Bailey as Black Widow, Troy Baker as Hawkeye, Eric Bauza as Iron Spider (Amadeus Cho), Benjamin Diskin as Spider-Man, Grant George as Ant-Man, JP Karliak as Baron Strucker and Vision, Jim Meskimen as Ultron, Bumper Robinson as Falcon, Roger Craig Smith as Captain America, Fred Tatasciore as Hulk, Travis Willingham as Thor and Yellowjacket, Mick Wingert as Iron Man

==== Lego Marvel Super Heroes: Guardians of the Galaxy – The Thanos Threat (2017) ====
Lego Marvel Super Heroes: Guardians of the Galaxy – The Thanos Threat is an animated Lego short film. The film premiered on YouTube and Disney XD.

The voice cast consists of Will Friedle as Star-Lord, Jonathan Adams as Ronan the Accuser, Trevor Devall as Rocket Raccoon, Jennifer Hale as Mantis, Stan Lee as a Ravager pilot, Vanessa Marshall as Gamora, Kevin Michael Richardson as Groot, Isaac C. Singleton Jr. as Thanos, David Sobolov as Drax the Destroyer, Cree Summer as Nebula, James Arnold Taylor as Yondu, and Travis Willingham as Thor and Taserface.

==== Lego Marvel Super Heroes: Black Panther – Trouble in Wakanda (2018) ====
Lego Marvel Super Heroes: Black Panther – Trouble in Wakanda is an animated Lego short film. It is a re-imagined retelling of Black Panther and Avengers: Infinity War. The film premiered on YouTube and Disney XD.

The voice cast consists of James C. Mathis III as Black Panther, Laura Bailey as Black Widow, Yvette Nicole Brown as Okoye, Trevor Devall as Ulysses Klaue, Keston John as Erik Killmonger, Daisy Lightfoot as Shuri, Liam O'Brien as Doctor Strange, Isaac C. Singleton Jr. as Thanos, Roger Craig Smith as Captain America, Fred Tatasciore as Hulk, Travis Willingham as Thor, and Mick Wingert as Iron Man

==== Lego Marvel Spider-Man: Vexed by Venom (2019) ====
Lego Marvel Spider-Man: Vexed by Venom is an animated Lego short film. It premiered on YouTube and Disney XD.

The voice cast consists of Robbie Daymond as Spider-Man and Doctor Octopus, Ben Pronsky as Venom, Laura Bailey as Ghost-Spider, Jennifer Hale as a science teacher, Josh Keaton as Green Goblin, Tara Strong as Mary Jane Watson.

==== Lego Marvel Avengers: Climate Conundrum (2020) ====
Lego Marvel Avengers: Climate Conundrum is a four-part animated Lego short film. The film premiered on YouTube and Disney XD.

The voice cast consists of Alex Barima as War Machine, James Blight as Hulk, Michael Daingerfield as Captain America, Ian Hanlin as Thor, Cole Howard as Spider-Man, Bill Newton as Justin Hammer, Nicole Oliver as Black Widow, Giles Panton as Iron Man, Adrian Petriw as Hawkeye, and Alex Zahara as Red Skull.

==== Lego Marvel Avengers: Loki in Training (2021) ====
Lego Marvel Avengers: Loki in Training is an animated Lego short film. The film premiered on YouTube and Disney XD.

The voice cast consists of Ashleigh Ball as Nebula, Alex Barima as War Machine, James Blight as Hulk, Michael Daingerfield as Captain America, Ian Hanlin as Thor, Deven Mack as Thanos, Bill Newton as Loki, Nicole Oliver as Black Widow, Giles Panton as Iron Man and Crossbones, and Adrian Petriw as Hawkeye

==== Lego Marvel Avengers: Time Twisted (2022) ====
Lego Marvel Avengers: Time Twisted is a five-part animated Lego short film. The film premiered on YouTube and Disney XD.

The voice cast consists of James Blight as Hulk, Michael Daingerfield as Captain America, Michael Dobson as Ultron, Ian Hanlin as Ant-Man and Thor, Deven Mack as Thanos, Elyse Maloway as Pepper Potts and Scarlet Witch, Omari Newton as Black Panther, Nicole Oliver as Black Widow, Giles Panton as Iron Man, Adrian Petriw as Hawkeye, and Alex Zahara as Red Skull.

==== Spider-Man: Across the Spider-Verse (2023) ====
A Lego Peter Parker / Spider-Man appears briefly in the 2023 animated superhero film Spider-Man: Across the Spider-Verse, voiced by Nic Novicki. In the film, Lego Peter is working for J. Jonah Jameson at the Daily Bugle when he's suddenly contacted by Miguel O'Hara / Spider-Man 2099. The sequence was animated by the 14-year-old Preston Mutanga, who attracted attention from the filmmakers after he published a re-animated version of the movie's trailer in a Lego style, which he made in Blender.

==== Lego Marvel Avengers: Code Red (2023) ====
Black Widow and the Avengers investigate the disappearance of their allies, leading them into a fight with the Collector.

On September 18, 2023, the specialLego Marvel Avengers: Code Red was announced, after it was first teased by Lego at the 2023 San Diego Comic-Con. With the announcement of the special, a poster was released for Code Red, which pays homage to Avengers: Endgame.

In October, the official trailer was released and the voice cast was announced, with Laura Bailey as Natasha Romanoff / Black Widow, Trevor Devall as Alexei Shostakov / Red Guardian, Haley Joel Osment as Taneleer Tivan / The Collector, Steve Blum as Logan / Wolverine, Will Friedle as a Hydra goon, James Mathis III as T'Challa / Black Panther, Liam O'Brien as Johann Schmidt / Red Skull, Laura Post as Betty Ross / Red She-Hulk, Bumper Robinson as Sam Wilson / Captain America, Roger Craig Smith as Steve Rogers / Captain America and Ivan Kragoff / Red Ghost, Fred Tatasciore as Bruce Banner / Hulk and Santa Claus, Travis Willingham as Thor, and Mick Wingert as Tony Stark / Iron Man and Arkady Gregorivich Rossovich / Omega Red. Lego Marvel Avengers: Code Red was released on Disney+ on October 27, 2023. It was released on the Marvel HQ YouTube channel on March 18, 2024.

==== Lego Marvel Avengers: Mission Demolition (2024) ====
This special debuted on Disney+ on October 18, 2024, and features the character Dennis Dunphy / Demolition Man, who serves as its main protagonist.

The voice cast is led by Will Friedle as Demolition Man, Kevin Smith as Terrax the Tamer, the special's main antagonist, and David Kaye as Vision, reprising his role from Avengers Assemble as well as Tom Brady as himself. The rest of the cast consists of Ogie Banks as Captain America, Laura Bailey as Black Widow and Statue of Liberty, Steve Blum as Wolverine, Gambit, and Trapster, Trevor Devall as Klaw and Rocket Raccoon, Susie Essman as Gloria, Jason Mantzoukas as Deadpool, Vanessa Marshall as Invisible Woman, James C. Mathis III as Black Panther, Julie Nathanson as Dazzler and Titania, Scott Porter as Iceman and Moon Knight, Kevin Michael Richardson as Groot and Ballinger, Lily Senfellipo as Ghost-Spider, Roger Craig Smith as Captain America, Punisher, and Thing, John Stamos as Iron Man, Fred Tatasciore as Hulk, Devil Dinosaur, and Ghost Rider, Tiffani Thiessen as She-Hulk, Diamond White as Moon Girl, Travis Willingham as Thor.

==== Lego Marvel Avengers: Strange Tails (2025) ====
Lego Marvel Avengers: Strange Tails is a two-part animated Lego short film. The film premiered on Disney+.

== Minifigures ==
Marvel Collectible Minifigure Series (set number: 71031) was released 1 September 2021 as a part of Lego Minifigures theme, and includes characters from various Marvel Studios television series. It consists of 12 figures instead of the usual 16.

== Video games ==
=== DC ===
==== Lego Batman: The Videogame ====
A video game based on the Lego DC Super Heroes half of the line, titled Lego Batman: The Videogame was released in fall 2008. The game was released for personal computer, Nintendo DS, PlayStation 2 and 3, the PSP, Wii and Xbox 360. The Mac OS X version of the game was released in April 2009 by Feral Interactive.

==== Lego Batman 2: DC Super Heroes ====
A video game sequel based on the Lego DC Super Heroes half of the line, titled Lego Batman 2: DC Super Heroes was released in the summer of 2012 as a sequel to Lego Batman: The Video Game. The game was released on personal computer, PlayStation 3, PlayStation Vita, Nintendo 3DS, Nintendo DS, Wii and Xbox 360. The Mac OS X version of the game, published by Feral Interactive, was released on 6 September the same year.

==== Lego Batman 3: Beyond Gotham ====
The third video game based on the Lego DC Super Heroes line, titled Lego Batman 3: Beyond Gotham was released in November 2014 as a sequel to both Lego Batman: The Video Game and Lego Batman 2: DC Super Heroes. The game was released on iOS, personal computer, PlayStation 3, PlayStation 4, PlayStation Vita, Nintendo 3DS, Wii U, Xbox 360 and Xbox One.

==== Lego Dimensions ====
The crossover toys-to-life game Lego Dimensions developed by Traveller's Tales features content based on the original The Lego Movie and The Lego Batman Movie. A "Starter Pack" includes an additional level that recreates the events of the original film and adds Wyldstyle as a playable character. Additional "Fun packs" add Emmet, Benny, Bad Cop and Unikitty as playable characters. A "story pack" offers an extended six-level story campaign retelling the events of The Lego Batman Movie, and includes a playable Robin (Note: He can transform into his Teen Titans Go! counterpart when he enters the Teen Titans Go! Adventure World.) and Batgirl. Additional "Fun packs" add Excalibur Batman as a playable character.

==== The Lego Batman Movie Game ====
Based on The Lego Batman Movie, Warner Bros. Interactive Entertainment released the endless-runner game coinciding with the release of the film. It was released for Android and iOS.

==== Lego DC Super-Villains ====
The fourth video game based on the Lego DC Super Heroes line, titled Lego DC Super-Villains was released in October 2018. Unlike the Lego Batman trilogy, this is the first Lego video game to focus entirely on villains of the DC Universe, similar to the villain levels featured in Lego Batman: The Videogame. The macOS version of the game was released by Feral Interactive in July 2019.

==== Lego Batman: Legacy of the Dark Knight ====
A fifth major title based on the Lego DC Super Heroes line, Lego Batman: Legacy of the Dark Knight, was announced on August 19, 2025 and was released on May 22, 2026. The game features an original story that incorporates different elements from various Batman-related media, including films, television series, comic books, and other video games.

=== Marvel ===
==== Lego Marvel Super Heroes ====
A video game based on the Lego Marvel Super Heroes line, titled Lego Marvel Super Heroes was released in October 2013. Originally, a Lego Avengers game was set to be made, but the developers felt that just being able to play as the Avengers was not enough, and thus decided to add other Marvel heroes. The game was released on iOS, personal computer, PlayStation 3, PlayStation 4, PlayStation Vita, Nintendo DS, Nintendo 3DS, Wii U, Xbox 360, Xbox One and published by Feral Interactive for OS X.

==== Lego Marvel's Avengers ====
A second standalone video game featuring the Lego Marvel Super Heroes line, separate from the first game, titled Lego Marvel's Avengers was released in January 2016. It follows the plots of the two Avengers movies, The Avengers and Avengers: Age of Ultron. It was released on personal computer, PlayStation 3, PlayStation 4, PlayStation Vita, Nintendo 3DS, Wii U, Xbox 360 and Xbox One.

==== Lego Marvel Super Heroes 2 ====
The third game featuring the Lego Marvel Super Heroes line, titled Lego Marvel Super Heroes 2 was released in November 2017, as a direct sequel to the original Lego Marvel Super Heroes. The game is not related to the standalone game Lego Marvel's Avengers.

==== Lego Marvel Collection ====
A video game compilation was released in March 2019, featuring all three Lego Marvel video games.

=== Pixar ===
==== Lego The Incredibles ====
A video game adaptation based on the events of The Incredibles and Incredibles 2 films, titled Lego The Incredibles was released in June 2018. The game was developed by TT Fusion and released by Warner Bros. Interactive Entertainment for Nintendo Switch, Xbox One and PlayStation 4 coinciding with the release of the second film. A macOS version of the game was released by Feral Interactive in November the same year.

== App ==
An app titled Lego Duplo Marvel was developed by The Lego Group for iOS and Android. It was released on 9 December 2021 for preschoolers. It includes Spider-Man, Captain America, Ghost-Spider and more. Aimed towards children ages 2 to 5 years old.

== Reception ==
In 2020, the Toy Retailers Association listed the Iron Man Hall of Armor (set number: 76125) on its official list of Toy of the Year Awards.

In September 2022, Batman Classic TV Series Batmobile (set number: 76188), Jim Lee Batman Collection (set number: 31205), The Batcave (set number: 6860), Batmobile: The Penguin Chase (set number: 76181) and Batmobile Tumbler (set number: 76240) was listed on the "Five of the best Lego Batman sets for Batman Day 2022" by Lego fansite BrickFanatics.

== Awards and nominations ==
In 2012, Batwing Battle Over Gotham City was awarded "DreamToys" in the Construction category by the Toy Retailers Association.

In 2014, Batman Man-Bat attack was awarded "DreamToys" in the Build The World category by the Toy Retailers Association.

In 2019, War Machine Buster was awarded "DreamToys" in the Movie Magic category by the Toy Retailers Association.

In 2022, Lego Marvel Series Collectible Minifigures (set number: 71031) was awarded "Toy of the Year" and also "Collectible of the Year" by the Toy Association. Daily Bugle (set number: 76178) was awarded "Toy of the Year" and also "Construction Toy of the Year" by the Toy Association.

In September 2022, I am Groot (set number: 76217) was awarded "Toy of the Year" and also "Construction Toy of the Year" by the Toy Association.

== See also ==
- Lego Batman
- The Lego Batman Movie (Lego theme)
- Lego DC Super Hero Girls
- Lego Spider-Man
- Lego Minifigures (theme)
- Lego Modular Buildings
- Lego BrickHeadz
