= Christopher Corey Smith =

American voice actor

- Other name: Chris Kent
- Occupation: Voice actor
- Years active: 1994; 2000–present
- Notable credits: In Gurren Lagann as Kittan Bachika; In One Piece as Spandam; Lego Batman video games as Joker
- Spouse: Cindy Robinson (m. 2022)

Christopher Corey Smith is an American voice actor who voices in animated shows and video games. He is known for voicing Kittan Bachika in Gurren Lagann, Spandam in One Piece, and the Joker in the Lego Batman video games.

== Personal life ==
On April 29, 2022, Smith married voice actress Cindy Robinson.

== Filmography ==
=== Anime ===
List of voice performances in anime
Year	Title	Role	Notes	Source
2003	.hack//Liminality	Guard A		CA
2003	The Twelve Kingdoms	Gyousou	As Chris Kent	CA
2004	Tenchi Muyo! GXP	Tenchi Masaki	As Chris Kent	
2004	Gad Guard	Nacho	As Chris Kent	CA
2004	Ghost in the Shell: Stand Alone Complex	Medical Student, Homeless Man #2		CA
2004	Submarine 707R	Kenji Minahaya	As Chris Kent	CA
2004	Gungrave	Eddie Gallarde, others	As Chris Kent	CA
2004	Marmalade Boy	Various characters	As Chris Kent	CA
2004–2005	Monster	Dr. Geitel, Detective Martin	Episode 5 and 26	
2005	Rumiko Takahashi Anthology	Yuji Kogure	Ep. "The Executive's Dog"; As Chris Kent	CA
2005	Samurai Champloo	Various characters	As Chris Kent	CA
2005	Saiyuki Reload	Car Thief A	As Chris Kent	CA
2005	Overman King Gainer	Kashmir Valle	As Chris Kent	CA
2005	New Getter Robo	Lab staff	As Chris Kent	CA
2005	Skyhigh	Ryo	Live-action dub As Chris Kent	CA
2005	Tenjho Tenge	Kagurazaka, Businessman B	As Chris Kent	CA
2005	Planetes	Pickpocket		CA
2005	Fafner in the Azure	Yoji Hino	As Chris Kent	CA
2005	Mermaid Forest	Older Nanao, Young Pa	As Chris Kent	CA
2005	Mars Daybreak	Chairman Focault		CA
2006	Gun Sword	Denehee, others	As Chris Kent	CA
2006	Death Trance	Sid	live-action dub As Chris Kent	CA
2007	Flag	1st Lt. Christian Beloqui	As Chris Kent	CA
2008	Buso Renkin	Moon Face, Saruwatari		CA
2008	Gurren Lagann	Kittan		
2008	Strait Jacket	Falk		
2009–2013	Bleach	Rojuro "Rose" Otoribashi, Wonderweiss Magera, Makoto Kibune, Central 46 Member, Kotei Academy Kendo Student		
2009	Honey and Clover	Shuji Hanamoto		
2010	Vampire Knight	Headmaster Kaien Cross		
2011	Marvel Anime: Blade	Lucius Isaac, Vampire Guard		
2012	Fullmetal Alchemist Brotherhood OVA collection	Judeau		
2012	Persona 4: The Animation	Master Daidara		
2012	Jormungand	Lehm Brick		
2012	Jormungand: Perfect Order	Lehm Brick		
2012	Berserk: The Golden Age Arc	King of Midland		
2013	K	Tatsuya Enomoto, Ryuho Kamo, Ren Goto, Shoei Akagi		
2013–2014	B-Daman CrossFire	Dracyan, Akira Saiga	As Chris Marlowe	
2013	Digimon Fusion	Jijimon, Redmeramons, Goblinmons, Slashangemon, Grademon, Splashmon		
2013	Future Diary	John Balks (11th)		
2014	Attack on Titan	Oruo Bozad		
2014	One Piece	Spandam		Press
2014	High School DxD	Riser Phoenix		Press
2018	Hunter × Hunter (2011)	Kite		
2018–present	Boruto: Naruto Next Generations	Katasuke Tono		
2019	Ingress: The Animation	Hank Johnson	Netflix dub	
2020	Marvel Future Avengers	Clint Barton / Hawkeye		
2020	Dorohedoro	Turkey	Netflix dub	
2021	Shadows House	Edward		
2021	Sakugan	Gagumber	Crunchyroll dub	
2023	Rurouni Kenshin	Okina	Crunchyroll dub	
2025	Yaiba: Samurai Legend	Musashi Miyamoto		

=== Animation ===
List of voice performances in animation
Year	Title	Role	Notes	Source
1994	SWAT Kats: The Radical Squadron	First Officer Traag	Ep. "When Strikes Mutilor"	
2012	Scooby-Doo! Mystery Incorporated	Race Bannon, Bobo	Ep. "Heart of Evil"	
2013	The Jungle Bunch to the Rescue	Bob		
2014	Hero Factory	Daniel Rocka, Foreman Worker	Ep. "Invasion from Below"	
2014	Phineas and Ferb: Star Wars	Luke Skywalker, Blatto	TV special	
2015–2016	Popples	Coach Loudly		
2015–present	Miraculous: Tales of Ladybug & Cat Noir	Wayzz, Tom Dupain, Roger Raincomprix, Noé Luxus		Tweet
2016–2018	Zak Storm	Crogar		
2017	Freedom Fighters: The Ray	Donald	Ep. #1.3	
2020	The Idhun Chronicles	Elrion	Netflix dub	
2021–present	Ghostforce	Nolan Kasenti		Tweet

=== Film ===
List of voice performances in direct-to-video and television films
Year	Title	Role	Notes	Source
2007	Ghost in the Shell: Stand Alone Complex - Solid State Society	Koshiki		CA
2011	The Jungle Bunch: The Movie	Bob		
2012	Fullmetal Alchemist: The Sacred Star of Milos	Soyuz		
2012	Sengoku Basara: The Last Party	Mogami Yoshiaki		
2012	Berserk: The Golden Age Arc I: The Egg of the King	King of Midland		
2012	The Snow Queen	Prince, Master Vegard, Robbers		
2013	Lego Batman: The Movie – DC Super Heroes Unite	Joker		
2013	Alpha and Omega 2: A Howl-iday Adventure	Marcel, Paddy, Rogue #3		
2014	Alpha and Omega 3: The Great Wolf Games	Marcel, Paddy, Mooch		
2014	Alpha and Omega 4: The Legend of the Saw Tooth Cave	Marcel, Paddy		
2015	Alpha and Omega 5: Family Vacation	Paddy, Marcel, Jethro, Shakey, Mooch		
2015	Boruto: Naruto the Movie	Katasuke Tono		
2016	Alpha and Omega 6: Dino Digs	Paddy, Marcel, Jethro		
2016	Alpha and Omega 7: The Big Fureeze	Paddy, Marcel		
2017	Alpha and Omega 8: Journey to Bear Kingdom	Paddy, Marcel, King, Louis, Claw		
2017	The Jungle Bunch	Bob		
2023	Ladybug & Cat Noir: The Movie	Tom Dupain	English dub	

=== Video games ===
List of voice performances in video games
Year	Title	Role	Notes	Source
2000	Spider-Man	Hostage, Police Pilot, Sniper, Microchip		
2005	Xenosaga Episode II	Kevin Winnicot, Vector Staff		
2005	God of War	Undead Soldier, Greek Soldier		
2005	The Matrix: Path of Neo	Agent Smith		
2006	Valkyrie Profile 2: Silmeria	Ehlan, Gerald, Guilm, Khanon, Mithra	As Chris Kent	
2006	Tales of the Abyss	Emperor Peony		
2006	Happy Feet	Memphis, Noah the Elder		
2008	Mortal Kombat vs. DC Universe	Superman, Guardians of the Universe Member #3, Batcave Computer		
2008	The Last Remnant	Pagus	As Chris Kent	
2009–2012	Street Fighter series	Rufus	As Chris Kent	
2009	Dissidia Final Fantasy	The Emperor		
2010	Sengoku Basara: Samurai Heroes	Mogami Yoshiaki	As Christopher Smith	
2011	Dissidia 012 Final Fantasy	The Emperor		
2011	The Elder Scrolls V: Skyrim	Molag Bal		
2012	Armored Core V	City Police Captain, Zodiac No. 10, AC Pilot		
2012	Lego Batman 2: DC Super Heroes	The Joker		Facebook
2012	Resident Evil 6	Civilians	As Chris Smith	
2012	Dishonored	Guard Captain Curnow		
2013	Fire Emblem Awakening	Avatar, Yarne		
2013	Armored Core: Verdict Day	Various pilots, AI	As Chris Smith	
2013	Pac-Man and the Ghostly Adventures	Betrayus, Dr. Buttocks		
2014	Infamous Second Son	Activist		
2014	Lego Ninjago: Nindroids	The Overlord	As Chris Smith	
2014	Pac-Man and the Ghostly Adventures 2	Betrayus, Dr. Buttocks		Facebook
2014	Lego Batman 3: Beyond Gotham	The Joker		
2014-	The Elder Scrolls Online	Razum-Dar		
2015	Xenoblade Chronicles X	Additional voices		
2015–17	Lego Dimensions	The Joker, Marshal James Strickland, Lagravis, The Wizard of Oz, Agent Smith, HAL 9000		Facebook
2016	Street Fighter V	G		
2016	Star Ocean: Integrity and Faithlessness	Emmerson T. Kenny		
2016	Mafia III	Tommy Marcano	Voice & Mo-Cap	
2017	Fire Emblem Heroes	Reinhardt, Legion, Seth		
2017	Persona 5	Kunikazu Okumura		Tweet
2018	Dissidia Final Fantasy NT	Emperor		
2018	Detective Pikachu	Mewtwo		
2018	Dark Deception	Malak, Gold Watchers, Clown Gremlins, Goliath Clowns, Doug Houser		
2018	Mega Man 11	Acid Man, Chairman	As Chris Smith	
2019	Fire Emblem: Three Houses	Thales, Arundel	As Chris Smith	
2020	Persona 5 Royal	Kunikazu Okumura	As Christopher C. Smith	
2020	Deadly Premonition 2: A Blessing in Disguise	Simon Jones	As Chris Smith	
2020	The Legend of Heroes: Trails of Cold Steel IV	Professor G. Schmidt, Matthew Crawford	As Chris Smith	
2021	Akiba's Trip: Hellbound & Debriefed	Seigen Kitada	As Chris Smith	
2022	Fire Emblem Warriors: Three Hopes	Thales, Lord Arundel	As Chris Smith	
2022	Star Ocean: The Divine Force	Additional voices	As Chris Smith	
2023	Octopath Traveler II	Additional voices		
2023	The Legend of Heroes: Trails into Reverie	G. Schmidt, Alex Dudley, Matthew, Shang Hui		
2023	Detective Pikachu Returns	Mewtwo		
2023	Like a Dragon Gaiden: The Man Who Erased His Name	Additional voices		
2024	Unicorn Overlord	Mercenaries (Type B), additional voices		
2025	Civilization VII	Benjamin Franklin	As Christopher Smith	Tweet
2026	The Adventures of Elliot: The Millennium Tales	Hildebrandt	As Christopher Smith	
