= Lego Batman =

Lego theme and product range

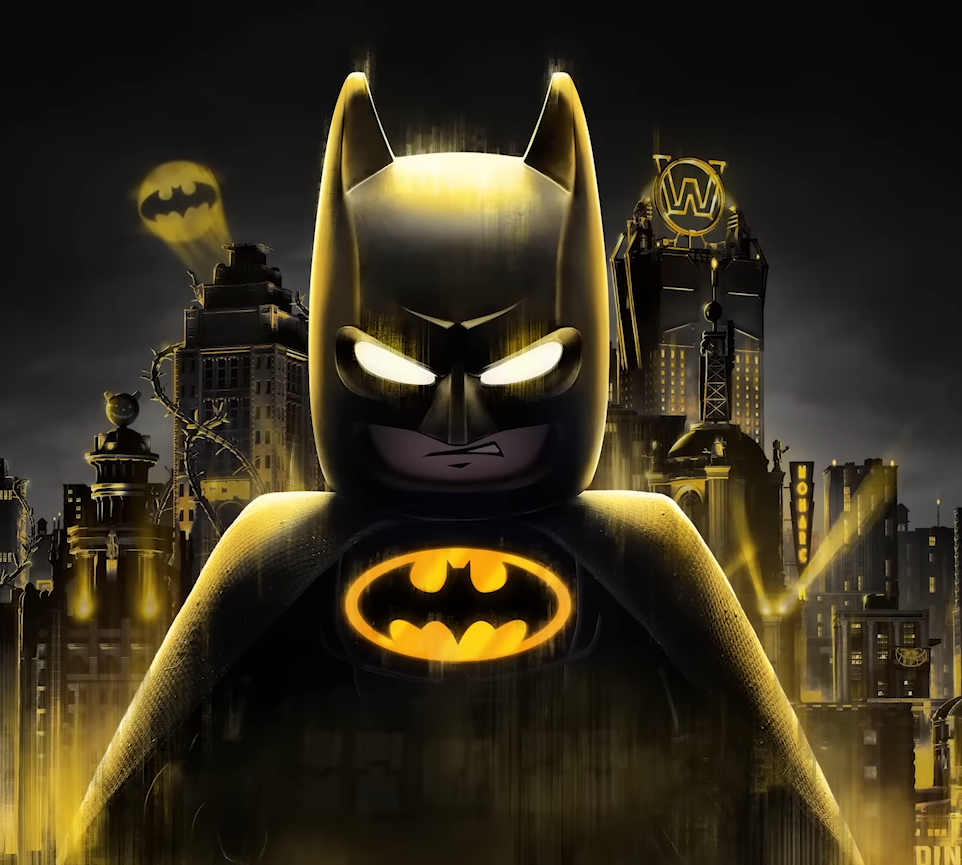
- The Batman minifigure as he appears in promotional material for Lego Batman: Legacy of the Dark Knight
- Parent theme: Lego DC Comics Super Heroes (2012–present)
- Subject: Batman
- Licensed from: DC Comics (Warner Bros.)
- Availability: 2006–2008; 2012–present (part of DC Universe Super Hero sets); 2017–2018 (part of Lego Batman Movie sets)
- Total sets: 15
- Official website

Lego Batman is a product range and theme of the Lego building toy, introduced in 2006, based on the superhero Batman, under license from DC Comics. The sets feature vehicles, characters and scenes from the comics and films. The inspirations for the design of these vary widely. For example, the Batmobile retains its basic sleek shape and prominent fins from the Tim Burton films, whereas the "Bat-Tank" seems to be based on the tank-like Batmobile in Frank Miller's The Dark Knight Returns. The theme has spawned multiple TV series, video games and films.

The theme was relaunched in early 2012 as part of the Lego DC Universe Superheroes line, which is a sub-theme of the Lego Super Heroes line.

== Overview ==
The product line focuses on the superhero character Batman has been adapted into various media including film, radio, television, and video games, as well as numerous merchandising items. Lego Batman aimed to recreate the main characters in Lego form, including Batman, Robin, the Joker, Bane and Harley Quinn.

== Development ==
Lego Batman was inspired by the Batman franchise. The construction toy range was based on the media franchise and developed in collaboration with Warner Bros. Consumer Products. The construction sets were designed to recreate the story and characters of the media franchise in Lego form.

== Construction sets ==
According to BrickLink, The Lego Group released a total of 15 Lego sets as part of Lego Batman theme.

=== Non-Batman film sets ===
Batman is given a wide range of vehicles, their appearances resembling their accepted forms. Several vehicles, including the "Batman Dragster", "Batman's Buggy", and "Bat-Tank", have also been introduced. The Batmobile appears similar to the way it does in the 1989 film, while the Batboat takes on a hovercraft-like form. All the set-boxes feature a comic strip by artist Greg Hyland at the back, featuring stylized versions of the set in action.

The first seven sets were released in 2006: The Batman Dragster: Catwoman Pursuit (set number: 7779), The Batboat: Hunt for Killer Croc (set number: 7780), The Batmobile: Two-Face's Escape (set number: 7781), The Batwing: The Joker's Aerial Assault (set number: 7782), The Batcave: The Penguin and Mr. Freeze's Invasion (set number: 7783), The Batmobile: Ultimate Collector's Edition (set number: 7784) and Arkham Asylum (set number: 7785).

The next two sets were released in 2007: The Batcopter: The Chase for Scarecrow (set number: 7786) and The Bat-Tank: The Riddler and Bane's Hideout (set number: 7787).

The last four sets were released in 2008: Batman's Buggy: The Escape of Mr. Freeze (set number: 7884), Robin's Scuba Jet: Attack of The Penguin (set number: 7885), The Batcycle: Harley Quinn's Hammer Truck (set number: 7886) and The Tumbler: Joker's Ice-Cream Surprise (set number: 7888).

Lego Batman has been re-introduced in 2012 as part of the Lego Super Heroes theme. Five sets were released on 1 January 2012. They are The Dynamic Duo Funhouse Escape (set number: 6857), Catwoman Catcycle City Chase (set number: 6858), The Batcave (set number: 6860), Batwing Battle Over Gotham City (set number: 6863), and Batmobile and the Two-Face Chase (set number: 6864). Later, on 28 December 2012, Arkham Asylum (set number: 10937), and Batman vs. Mr. Freeze: Aquaman on Ice (set number: 76000) were released.

In 2013, a Robin and Redbird Cycle (set number: 30166) polybag was released as a promotion.

Three sets were released on 4 January 2014. They are Batman: The Penguin Face Off (set number: 76010), Batman: Man-Bat Attack (set number: 76011) and Batman: The Riddler Chase (set number: 76012). Later, on 18 February 2014, Batman: The Joker Steam Roller (set number: 76013) was released. In addition, a The Joker Bumper Car (set number: 30303) polybag was released as a promotion.

Two sets were released on 2 August 2015. They are The Batboat Harbor Pursuit (set number: 76034) and Jokerland (set number: 76035).

On 1 March 2016, Gotham City Cycle Chase (set number: 76053) was released. Later, three sets namely Batman: Scarecrow Harvest of Fear (set number: 76054), Batman: Killer Croc Sewer Smash (set number: 76055) and Batman: Rescue from Ra's al Ghul (set number: 76056) were released on August 1 the same year.

Three sets were released on 1 August 2018. They are Batman: The Attack of the Talons (set number: 76110), Batman: Brother Eye Takedown (set number: 76111) and App-Controlled Batmobile (set number: 76112).

Two sets were released on 2 January 2019. They are Batman Batsub and the Underwater Clash (set number: 76116), and Batman Mech vs. Poison Ivy Mech (set number: 76117). Later, July 1, Mr. Freeze Batcycle Battle (set number: 76118) was released. Five sets were released on August 2. They are Batmobile: Pursuit of The Joker (set number: 76119), Batwing and The Riddler Heist (set number: 76120), Batcave Clayface Invasion (set number: 76122), Batman vs. The Riddler Robbery (set number: 76137) and Batman and The Joker Escape (set number: 76138).

Three sets were released on 24 August 2020. They are Batboat The Penguin Pursuit! (set number: 76158), Joker's Trike Chase (set number: 76159), and Mobile Bat Base (set number: 76160).

=== The Dark Knight Trilogy ===
The Bat vs. Bane: Tumbler Chase (set number: 76001), based on The Dark Knight Rises film, was released on 29 December 2012.

The Tumbler (set number: 76023), based on The Dark Knight film was released was released on 24 December 2014. In addition, a The Batman Tumbler (set number: 30300) polybag was released as a promotion.

In 2021, a remake of the 2014 The Tumbler (set number: 76240) was released.

=== Batman Classic TV Series ===
The Batman Classic TV Series - Batcave (set number: 76052), based on the 1960s Batman TV series was released on 1 March 2016. In addition, a Batman Classic TV Series - Mr. Freeze (set number: 30603) polybag was released as a promotion.

=== The Lego Batman Movie ===
From 2017 to 2018, Lego released 42 sets and promotional polybags as part of The Lego Batman Movie theme.

=== 1989 Batman ===
The 1989 Batmobile (set number: 76139), based on the 1989 Batman film, was released on 30 November 2019.

The 1989 Batwing (set number: 76161) was released on 1 November 2020.

=== The Batman ===
In conjunction with the 2022 The Batman film, Lego released four movie tie-in sets on 1 November 2021, namely Batman & Selina Kyle Motorcycle Pursuit (set number: 76179), Batmobile: The Penguin Chase (set number: 76181), Batcave: The Riddler Face-Off (set number: 76183) as well as The Batman - Batmobile (set number: 42127) under the Lego Technic theme.

=== Batman Forever ===
The Batmobile based on the 1995 film, Batman Forever (set number: 76304) was released on 1 August 2025.

=== Lego Minifigures ===
In 2017, 71017 The Lego Batman Movie Series 1 was released, based on The Lego Batman Movie film, with a total of 20 minifigures. A follow-up was released in 2018 in 71020 The Lego Batman Movie Series 2, with a total of 20 minifigures.

In 2020, 71026 DC Super Heroes Series was released, based on DC Comics, with a total of 16 minifigures.

=== Lego Brick Sketches ===
Lego released the 40386 Batman and 40428 The Joker under the Lego Brick Sketches theme on 1 June 2020.

=== Lego Art ===
Lego released the 31205 Jim Lee Batman Collection under the Lego Art theme on 1 March 2022.

== Film and television ==
=== Lego Batman: The Movie – DC Super Heroes Unite ===
Lego Batman: The Movie – DC Super Heroes Unite is an animated superhero action comedy film based on the video game Lego Batman 2: DC Super Heroes. It encompasses most cutscenes from the game, while the gameplay was replaced by new scenes. The film was released on Blu-ray and DVD on 21 May 2013, and received generally positive reviews, with praise for the animation and action, although the promotional tone of the film was criticized.

=== The Lego Movie ===
The Lego Batman character appears in the 2014 The Lego Movie voiced by Will Arnett.

=== Lego DC Comics: Batman Be-Leaguered ===
Cartoon Network aired the television special Lego DC Comics: Batman Be-Leaguered on 27 October 2014, which details Superman wanting to recruit Batman into the Justice League while he is fighting Penguin and other villains over a gem, but he refuses the league. When Superman mysteriously goes missing, Batman recruits Flash to help find him. With nothing to report, they run into Captain Cold, who is trying to steal an Atlantean pillar in a desert. After a fight which results in the Batwing getting destroyed and Flash mysteriously disappearing, Batman defeats Cold, only for him and the pillar to go missing as well. He goes to Aquaman in the sea, who fights Black Manta for the trident of Poseidon, but he goes through a similar situation, where Aquaman disappears, Batman defeats Manta, and then he and the trident are warped away. Realizing that the Justice League is the target and not the artifacts Batman goes to Wonder Woman and Cyborg, who are fighting Luthor in Metropolis. As Luthor reveals an anonymous buyer wants the daily planet globe, Wonder Woman and Cyborg disappear, leaving Batman to defeat Luthor, only for him and the globe to disappear. Batman realizes that the plot was by Bat-Mite and it was to abduct the members of the Justice League and so that Batman can be the number one superhero in the universe. The film was released on DVD with Lego DC Comics Super Heroes: Justice League vs. Bizarro League in 2015.

=== Lego DC Comics Super Heroes: Justice League vs. Bizarro League ===
Lego DC Comics Super Heroes: Justice League vs. Bizarro League is an animated comedy film based on the Lego and DC Comics brands, released on February 10, 2015, on Blu-ray and DVD. This is the third Lego DC Comics film following Lego Batman: The Movie – DC Super Heroes Unite and Lego DC Comics: Batman Be-Leaguered. Some actors from various DC properties reprise their respective roles, including Nolan North as Superman, Khary Payton as Cyborg, Diedrich Bader as Green Lantern (Guy Gardner) and Tom Kenny as The Penguin and Plastic Man. The film received mixed but unfavorable reviews from critics, with criticisms focusing on the silly and promotional tone and the characters, although the animation was praised.

=== Lego DC Comics Super Heroes: Justice League – Attack of the Legion of Doom ===
Lego DC Comics Super Heroes: Justice League – Attack of the Legion of Doom is an animated comedy film based on the Lego and DC Comics brands, which was released on August 25, 2015, on Blu-ray, DVD and Digital HD. This is the fourth Lego DC Comics film following Lego Batman: The Movie – DC Super Heroes Unite, Lego DC Comics: Batman Be-Leaguered and Lego DC Comics Super Heroes: Justice League vs. Bizarro League.

Actors from various (also copyrighted) DC properties reprise their respective roles, including Mark Hamill as The Trickster, Nolan North as Superman, Khary Payton as Cyborg, John DiMaggio as The Joker, Josh Keaton as Green Lantern, Kevin Michael Richardson as Black Manta, Grey Griffin as Lois Lane and Tom Kenny as The Penguin. The film received generally positive reviews, with praise for the animation, action, and humor, although some criticized the consumerism in the film.

=== Lego DC Comics Super Heroes: Justice League – Cosmic Clash ===
Lego DC Comics Super Heroes: Justice League – Cosmic Clash is an animated action comedy film based on the Lego and DC Comics brands, which was released on February 9, 2016, on Digital HD and March 1 on Blu-ray and DVD. It is the fifth Lego DC Comics film following Lego Batman: The Movie – DC Super Heroes Unite, Lego DC Comics: Batman Be-Leaguered, Lego DC Comics Super Heroes: Justice League vs. Bizarro League and Lego DC Comics Super Heroes: Justice League – Attack of the Legion of Doom. Some actors from various DC properties reprised their respective roles, including Nolan North as Superman and Khary Payton as Cyborg. The film received positive reviews, with critics deeming it superior to past films in the Lego DC Comics film series.

=== Lego DC Comics Super Heroes: Justice League – Gotham City Breakout ===
Lego DC Comics Super Heroes: Justice League – Gotham City Breakout is an animated superhero action comedy film based on the Lego and DC Comics brands, which was released on June 21, 2016, in Digital HD and on July 12 on Blu-ray and DVD. It is the sixth Lego DC Comics film following Lego Batman: The Movie – DC Super Heroes Unite, Lego DC Comics: Batman Be-Leaguered, Lego DC Comics Super Heroes: Justice League vs. Bizarro League, Lego DC Comics Super Heroes: Justice League – Attack of the Legion of Doom and Lego DC Comics Super Heroes: Justice League – Cosmic Clash. Some actors from various DC properties reprise their respective roles, including Nolan North as Superman and Troy Baker as Batman. The film received positive reviews, with praise for the action, although the consumerism was criticized.

=== The Lego Batman Movie ===
The Batman from The Lego Movie received his own spin-off film. Arnett reprised his role of Batman, while Chris McKay, who was earlier attached to the sequel, directed the film. It was released on February 10, 2017.

=== Lego DC Comics Super Heroes: The Flash ===
Lego DC Comics Super Heroes: The Flash is an American animated film. It is a superhero action-adventure comedy, based on the DC Comics and Lego brands. It is produced by DC Entertainment, The Lego Group and Warner Bros. Animation and distributed by Warner Bros. Home Entertainment, and was released digitally on February 13, 2018, and was released on DVD and Blu-ray on March 13. It is the seventh Lego DC Comics film. This is the first posthumous release for longtime DC producer Benjamin Melniker, who died a month before its release. The film received positive reviews from critics, who praised the action, humor, and animation.

=== Lego DC Comics Super Heroes: Aquaman – Rage of Atlantis ===
Lego DC Comics Super Heroes: Aquaman – Rage of Atlantis is an American animated film. It is a superhero action-adventure comedy, based on the DC Comics and Lego brands. Produced by DC Entertainment, The Lego Group and Warner Bros. Animation and distributed by Warner Bros. Home Entertainment. It premiered at San Diego Comic-Con on July 22, 2018 and was later released digitally, DVD and Blu-ray on July 31. It is the eighth Lego DC Comics film. The film received mixed reviews, with praise for the animation but criticism for the consumerism.

=== The Lego Movie 2: The Second Part ===
Batman also appears in the 2019 The Lego Movie 2: The Second Part.

=== Lego DC Batman: Family Matters ===
Lego DC Batman: Family Matters is an American animated film. It is a superhero action-adventure comedy based on the DC Comics and Lego brands produced by DC Entertainment, The Lego Group and Warner Bros. Animation, and distributed by Warner Bros. Home Entertainment, it premiered at San Diego Comic-Con on July 21, 2019 and was later released on DVD, Blu-ray and Digital on August 20. It is the ninth Lego DC Comics film. The DVD release includes a free 84-piece Lego set. The film received positive reviews, with praise for the humor and action, although the consumerism was criticized.

=== Lego DC Shazam! Magic and Monsters ===
Lego DC Shazam! Magic and Monsters is an American animated superhero action-adventure comedy film based on the DC Comics and Lego brands produced by DC Entertainment, The Lego Group and Warner Bros. Animation and distributed by Warner Bros. Home Entertainment. It is the tenth and final Lego DC Comics film. The film was released on digital on April 28, and on Blu-ray/DVD on June 16, 2020. The film received positive reviews from critics, with praise for the humor and action.

== Video games ==
Lego Batman: The Videogame
A video game based on the theme called Lego Batman: The Videogame was released in 2008. Produced by TT Games, the game followed similar titles based upon Lego Star Wars and Lego Indiana Jones.
Lego Batman 2: DC Super Heroes
A sequel to the first Lego Batman called Lego Batman 2: DC Super Heroes was released in 2012 and included other DC Comics characters like Superman, Wonder Woman, Green Lantern, and the Flash, most of them appearing towards the end of the story.
The Lego Movie Videogame
The Lego Batman character appeared as a playable character in the video game based on The Lego Movie in which he also appeared in.
Lego Batman 3: Beyond Gotham
A direct sequel to Lego Batman 2 called Lego Batman 3: Beyond Gotham was released in 2014. This third installment saw Batman travel outside of Gotham into space with the Justice League. The game features bonus DLC content featuring different generations of Batman in Lego form such as Batman 1966 and The Dark Knight Trilogy. Despite the title, Batman was not the main focus in this installment and it was more focused on the entire Justice League and other DC Superheroes.
Lego Dimensions
Two versions of the Lego Batman character (DC Comics & The Lego Movie) appeared again in the video game Lego Dimensions, which was released in 2015. This game involves a crossover of different characters from different franchises such as DC Comics, The Wizard of Oz, Back to the Future, The Lego Movie, etc.
Lego DC Super-Villains
A direct spin-off to the Lego Batman trilogy called Lego DC Super-Villains that was released in 2018. The spin-off sees both Batman and the Justice League missing as the game focuses on villains of the DC Universe.
The Lego Movie 2 Videogame
The Lego Batman character appeared as a playable character in the video game based on The Lego Movie in which he also appeared in.
Lego Batman: Legacy of the Dark Knight
A video game called Lego Batman: Legacy of the Dark Knight was released in 2026 for Nintendo Switch 2, PlayStation 5, Windows and Xbox Series X/S consoles. This game features an original story based on the live-action Batman films.

== Awards and nominations ==
In 2012, Batwing Battle Over Gotham City was awarded "DreamToys" in the Construction category by the Toy Retailers Association.

In 2014, Batman Man-Bat attack was awarded "DreamToys" in the Build The World category by the Toy Retailers Association.

== See also ==
- The Lego Batman Movie
- The Lego Batman Movie (Lego theme)
- Lego DC Super Hero Girls
- Lego Super Heroes
