= Lego DC Comics Super Heroes: Batman Be-Leaguered =

2014 television film

- Film poster
- Screenplay by: James Krieg
- Directed by: Rick Morales
- Starring: Troy Baker; Dee Bradley Baker; Grey DeLisle; John DiMaggio; Tom Kenny; Nolan North; Khary Payton; Paul Reubens; Kevin Michael Richardson; James Arnold Taylor
- Music by: Tim Kelly
- Country of origin: United States
- Original language: English

Production
- Running time: 22 minutes
- Production companies: Warner Bros. Animation; The Lego Group; DC Entertainment

Original release
- Network: Cartoon Network
- Release: October 27, 2014

Lego DC Comics Super Heroes: Batman Be-Leaguered is an animated superhero short film based on the Lego and DC Comics brands. It premiered on Cartoon Network on October 27, 2014, and is the second Lego DC Comics film following Lego Batman: The Movie – DC Super Heroes Unite. The short film is included as an extra on the home video release of Lego DC Comics Super Heroes: Justice League vs. Bizarro League.

== Plot ==
In Gotham City, Batman is fighting Man-Bat at the museum when he is then ambushed by Penguin. Superman arrives in Gotham City where he wants Batman to join his new superhero team called the Justice League, but Batman prides himself on working alone. To Batman's annoyance, Superman aids him in fighting Man-Bat, Penguin, and Penguin's Robo-Penguins, even when Joker joins the fight. After he defeats Penguin, Man-Bat, and Joker, Superman flies out, but he then disappears along with the villains and the gem.

Batman calls in the Flash to help with his search for Superman. The Flash travels around the world with Batman following in the Batwing until they find Captain Cold trying to steal an obelisk in Egypt. Flash and Batman fight him, but Flash disappears mid fight while Batman is frozen solid without his utility belt. Batman thaws and defeats Cold, but he and the obelisk disappear. Upon finding Atlantean symbols on the obelisk before its disappearance, Batman decides to make another call.

Batman then asks Aquaman for help in the Batboat as they search under the ocean. They find Black Manta and his robot sharks trying to steal the Trident of Poseidon. Batman once again wins the fight, but Aquaman, Black Manta, and the trident all disappear.

Batman then goes to Metropolis where Wonder Woman and Cyborg are fighting Lex Luthor who is trying to steal the Daily Planet Globe for an anonymous buyer. Once again, the Justice League members disappear, Batman defeats Luthor, but he and the globe disappear.

Batman deduces who is behind it, and travels to the Justice League headquarters at the Hall of Justice, the last place he wanted to go. Once there, he identifies Bat-Mite as the culprit as Bat-Mite emerges from the shadows. Bat-Mite has prepared a trap for the Justice League including all of the stolen items. Batman refuses to save them just so Bat-Mite can see him in action, but while he lectures Bat-Mite, he hints that since the cage is immune to their powers due to Bat-Mite’s magic, they should escape in a non-super way by opening the door. Batman realizes that Bat-Mite unintentionally showed him how childish he was being by insisting that he works alone, so he accepts the invitation to the Justice League. Bat-Mite summons the villains, but they are easily defeated by the combined might of the Justice League, so Bat-Mite decides that instead of cheering on only Batman, he should cheer on an entire team. Before disappearing, Bat-Mite makes the villains disappear.

The rest of the Justice League is pleased that Batman is on their team as Batman laughs with them.

== Cast ==
- Troy Baker as Bruce Wayne / Batman
- Dee Bradley Baker as Arthur Curry / Aquaman, Man-Bat
- Grey DeLisle as Lois Lane, Diana Prince / Wonder Woman
- John DiMaggio as Joker, Lex Luthor
- Tom Kenny as Penguin
- Nolan North as Kal-El/Clark Kent / Superman, Alfred Pennyworth
- Khary Payton as Victor Stone / Cyborg
- Paul Reubens as Bat-Mite
- Kevin Michael Richardson as Black Manta, Captain Cold
- James Arnold Taylor as Barry Allen / Flash
