= Lego Movie Maker =

Discontinued mobile app

- App icon
- Developer: Uncorked Studios
- Release: 2012
- Operating system: iOS

Lego Movie Maker (formerly Lego Super Hero Movie Maker) was an app released for iOS that allowed users to create stop motion animations with Lego. It has since been delisted from the App Store.

The app contained simple features, allowing animated short films to be created easily. It was eventually rebranded to remove the DC Super Heroes theme. It was reported that tens of thousands of videos had been created using it.

== See also ==
- Stop Motion Studio
