= Lego Batman: The Videogame =

2008 video game

- North American cover art
- Developers: Traveller's Tales; TT Fusion (DS)
- Publishers: Warner Bros. Interactive Entertainment; Feral Interactive (OS X)
- Director: Jon Burton
- Producer: Kieran Gaynor
- Designers: Jon Burton; James Cunliffe; John Hodskinson; Arthur Parsons; Glyn Scragg
- Programmer: Luke Giddings
- Artist: James Cunliffe
- Composer: David Whittaker
- Series: Lego Batman
- Platforms: Microsoft Windows; Nintendo DS; PlayStation 2; PlayStation 3; PlayStation Portable; Wii; Xbox 360; Mac OS X
- Release: NA: 23 September 2008; EU: 10 October 2008; AU: 15 October 2008; Mac OS X: WW: 9 April 2009
- Genre: Action-adventure
- Modes: Single-player, multiplayer

Lego Batman: The Videogame is a 2008 action-adventure game developed by Traveller's Tales and published by Warner Bros. Interactive Entertainment for the Xbox 360, PlayStation 2, PlayStation 3, PlayStation Portable, Wii, Nintendo DS, and Microsoft Windows. A port for Mac OS X was released in April 2009 by Feral Interactive. The game is based on the DC Comics character Batman, as well as the eponymous Lego Batman toyline.

Lego Batman is similar to earlier Lego games developed by Traveller's Tales, such as the Lego Star Wars series and Lego Indiana Jones: The Original Adventures, in that it is both a game based on a licensed property, and has environments, objects, and creatures made out of Lego. However, Lego Batman is the first of these to have an original story. The game received positive reviews, and spawned three sequels: Lego Batman 2: DC Super Heroes, Lego Batman 3: Beyond Gotham and Lego Batman: Legacy of the Dark Knight, as well as a villain-themed spin-off, Lego DC Super-Villains.

== Gameplay ==
In-game screenshot showcasing combat with Riddler henchmen

The core gameplay of Lego Batman is similar to that of previous Lego video games, such as Lego Indiana Jones: The Original Adventures and the Lego Star Wars series. The player controls any one of a wide assortment of characters from a third-person perspective, primarily fighting enemies, solving puzzles, and collecting Lego "studs", the game's form of currency. Using attack combinations in combat will multiply the amount of studs earned. Studs can be utilized to purchase different powerups or customization options. The game is set in Gotham City, with mainly realistic environments; only interactive objects are made of Lego bricks. Often, players must assemble Lego objects to proceed further in the level, cross obstacles, or unlock new suits. Players are able to fight on land, sea, and in the air, using a number of character-controlled vehicles, including the Batmobile, Batboat, and Batwing. New moves to the series first featured in Lego Indiana Jones: The Original Adventures are featured in this game. New abilities introduced in this game include picking up and carrying enemies and walking on tightropes across buildings. Up to two players can play in co-operative mode, except in the PSP version which does not feature this mode.

There are thirty levels in the game, split equally throughout six chapters, each containing five levels. Completing a Hero chapter unlocks the corresponding Villain chapter. There are also two secret levels, which see the player exploring miniature versions of Wayne Manor and Arkham Asylum to collect studs. There are many different environments in the game, usually based upon the aesthetics of the rogues gallery, including an ice cream factory, a botanical garden, and the Gotham sewers. In Story Mode, the player may only switch between the two characters involved in that scene.As in previous Lego video games, levels are unlocked for "Free Play" mode once they are completed in Story Mode. "Free Play" allows the player to replay any level they have completed, with any characters they have unlocked so far. This permits access to special areas containing additional collectibles, where the player was unable to get to before.

The level hub for the heroes is the Batcave, where the player can purchase additional characters and view unlockables, similar to the Mos Eisley cantina in Lego Star Wars and Barnett College in Lego Indiana Jones. The corresponding hub for the villains is Arkham Asylum, where players can create their own character using parts from characters already unlocked, as well as a limited array of weapons. Individual characters are able to use many unique abilities related to their comic book powers and talents. For example, the Joker is able to attack enemies and activate machines with a hand buzzer, and the Penguin can glide with his umbrella. Hush can be unlocked after finding all 25 hostages in the villain and hero levels (excluding the vehicle levels). Once the game reaches 100%, the Ra's al Ghul character can be purchased and used as a playable character, and pieces for Azrael, Huntress, Black Mask and Spoiler can be used in the character creator.

Players are able to swap the costumes of each of the main heroes (Batman, Robin, Batgirl, and Nightwing) from their classic suits to ones with specific abilities. Batman and Batgirl share the same alternate suits, those being the Glide suit, which provides slowed descent, the Sonic suit, which allows the player to break glass objects, the Demolition suit, which grants access to bombs for detonation, and the Heat Protection Suit, which blocks damage from extremely hot temperatures. Robin and Nightwing also share the same alternate suits, those being the Technology suit, which grants access to tech panels, the Water suit, which allows for underwater travel, the Magnet suit, which grants access to climbing of magnetic surfaces, and the Attract suit, which vacuums up certain loose Lego pieces for rewards. In Story mode, suit switcher pads must be built with Lego bricks in order to swap suits, but "Free Play" mode allows for free on-the-go swapping.

=== Nintendo DS ===
In-game screenshot of the Nintendo DS version

The Nintendo DS version was altered to accommodate the memory and size limitations of the DS as well as integrate touch screen controls. Characters' special abilities, such as Batman's grappling hook (when pulling background objects) and detonation capsules, and elements such as switches can be controlled by using the touch screen, as well as switching characters. Some characters' special abilities, attack moves, and jump moves have been changed. For example, Batman can do double-jumps in the DS version, but not in the console versions. When Batman and Robin use a suit switcher pad, they cannot switch back to the previous suit. Batman also possesses a DS-exclusive Arctic suit. There are no cinematics, only slideshows featuring comic book-style panels.

This version also features several more characters not available in the console versions and includes an exclusive unlockable minigame called "Villain Hunt", which is used to unlock 10 extra characters: Killer Moth (classic version), Man-Bat, Hugo Strange, Mr. Zsasz, Black Mask, Firefly, the Ventriloquist and Scarface, Ra's al Ghul, Hush, and the Joker (Tropical suit). Some characters did not make it into the Story Levels but can be unlocked in different ways than in the console versions - these include: Talia al Ghul, Azrael, Huntress, and Killer Moth (the version from the Teen Titans TV series). Another detail contrasting other versions is that every stage ends in a boss fight.

=== Mobile phone ===
In-game screenshot of the mobile version

A mobile phone version of the game was also released by Glu. However, it plays much more like a straightforward platformer with scrolling beat 'em up elements, removing key gameplay features such as the ability to switch between characters with different abilities. The game is single-player only, and players can only play as Batman. It was later released as LEGO Batman: The Mobile Game by Gameloft in 2011.

== Plot ==
Lego Batman: The Videogame is notable for being the first Traveller's Tales Lego game to have an original plot. Unlike previous games, it is based more on the concept of a media franchise, rather than adapting the story of an existing film or piece of media. The game features Batman and Robin fighting crime and villainy in Gotham City. Batman's most dangerous foes have all escaped from Arkham Asylum and divided themselves into three groups of five, each led by a well-known villain with plans to achieve a personal goal:

- The Riddler, aided by Two-Face, Poison Ivy, Mr. Freeze, and Clayface, is after the city savings in the Gotham Gold Reserves.
- The Penguin, aided by Catwoman, Bane, Killer Croc, and Man-Bat, plans to seize control of Gotham using his remote-controlled penguin robots.
- The Joker, aided by Harley Quinn, Scarecrow, Mad Hatter, and Killer Moth, intends to blow up the Gotham cathedral and spread his deadly laughing gas across the city.

The game features two distinct campaigns: a hero storyline, where Batman and Robin fight the villains one by one while working to thwart their schemes; and a villain storyline, where the player assumes the role of the villains as they attempt to carry out their plan. Both campaigns consist of three individual chapters (one for each villain group), which can be played in any order (though each villain chapter must be unlocked by completing their corresponding hero chapter). The hero and villain levels often cross over with each other to create a sense of continuity; to understand the complete story of a chapter, one must play both the hero and villain levels (for example, Bane is never encountered during the hero portion of the Penguin's chapter because he had already been captured by the police in a villain level). At the conclusion of the villain chapters, the chief villain and their first deputy successfully initiate their master plan while the rest of the group is captured. The hero chapters, on the other hand, conclude with Batman and Robin thwarting the villains' schemes and sending them back to Arkham.

== Development and release ==
An early build for the PlayStation 2 console was shown at certain conferences (such as at Game On in London) by TT Games Publishing's Head of Production Jonathan Smith, with a small playable area featuring the same HUD as Lego Star Wars II: The Original Trilogy. DC Comics had an input into the game, providing the developers with reference materials for the game's characters. During the 2009 holiday season, Lego Batman and Pure were bundled with select Xbox 360 packages as a bonus, in a double-sided box. It also released with the Batman movie DVD that was bundled as a "Game + DVD Combo Pack" along with Mortal Kombat vs. DC Universe and Lego Harry Potter: Years 1-4.

Though material is taken from the comics, Lego Batman is mainly inspired by Batman media, such as films and television series. The most heavy inspiration comes from the 1990s Burton/Schumacher film series and the DCAU.

=== Audio ===
The game's soundtrack is Danny Elfman's score from Tim Burton's 1989 Batman film. The Nintendo DS version of the game uses some music from Batman Returns. Characters's vocal effects were provided by Steve Blum (as Batman, Joker, Killer Moth, Killer Croc and Two-Face), James Arnold Taylor (as Robin and Nightwing), Tom Kenny (as Riddler, Penguin, and the Police Officers), Fred Tatasciore (as Bane and Hush), Grey DeLisle (as Harley Quinn and Batgirl), Dave Wittenberg (as Scarecrow and Ra's al Ghul), Ogie Banks (as Mr. Freeze and Clayface), Vanessa Marshall (as Poison Ivy and Catwoman) with Chris Edgerly (as Mad Hatter and Man-Bat) and Keith Ferguson (as Alfred Pennyworth and James Gordon). Collette Sunderman voice directs this game.

== Reception ==
Reception

Aggregate score
Aggregator	Score
Metacritic	(PC) 80/100 (X360) 76/100 (PS3) 75/100 (Wii) 74/100 (PSP) 73/100 (DS) 72/100

Review scores
Publication	Score
1Up.com	C
Game Informer	7.5/10
GameSpot	6.5/10
IGN	7.3/10
Official Xbox Magazine (US)	7/10
PC Gamer (US)	88%
Igromania	6/10

Lego Batman received generally favorable reviews from critics upon release. IGN gave the game a 7.7 for the Wii, PS2, PS3 and 360, and a 7.3 for PSP stating that while the game has plenty of replay value, it also retains problematic elements from the previous games in the series and does not necessarily add anything new. The DS version received an 8.0 rating. GamesRadar gave it an 8 out of 10, noting that Traveller's Tales was able to be more open with the license than in previous games. In a review for PC Gamer, John Walker noted that the large number of locations in Gotham as a "welcome improvement" over Lego Indiana Jones: The Original Adventures. Combat is styled in the manner of the 1960s Batman series, and the game includes clever puzzles. The drawbacks mentioned include the fixed viewing perspective and the frequent respawning of opponents. "Iconic characters, such as Clayface and Robin, have been turned into village idiots," writes Ben of Game Informer who nevertheless later adds, "this game is filled with cool playable characters… Nightwing, Harley Quinn, Joker, Killer Croc, Bane, Catwoman, and Man-Bat only scratch the surface of the game's catalog of great characters." The Nintendo DS version was nominated for "Best Action Game of 2008 on the DS" by IGN. As of August 2010, the game has sold over 7 million copies worldwide. As of January 2012, the game has sold over 11 million copies worldwide. The Russian magazine Igromania gave the game a mixed review, stating "It's still good, but nowhere near as brilliant as LEGO Star Wars", citing the lack of jokes about the Batman movies. During the 12th Annual Interactive Achievement Awards, the Academy of Interactive Arts & Sciences nominated Lego Batman for "Outstanding Achievement in Adapted Story".

== Sequels ==
A sequel, Lego Batman 2: DC Super Heroes, was announced by Warner Bros to be in development by Traveller's Tales. Released in June 2012, the game's characters and models are inspired by the Lego DC Super Heroes sets. A third game, titled Lego Batman 3: Beyond Gotham, was released in November 2014. A spin-off, Lego DC Super-Villains, was released in October 2018, around the time of the original game's tenth anniversary. Lego Batman: Legacy of the Dark Knight was released in May 2026, over a decade since the last mainline Lego Batman game.
