= Lego Batman 2: DC Super Heroes =

2012 video game

- Developers: Traveller's Tales; TT Fusion (handheld/mobile)
- Publishers: Warner Bros. Interactive Entertainment; Feral Interactive (OS X)
- Directors: Jon Burton; John Hodskinson; Jonathan Smith
- Designer: Jon Burton
- Programmer: Steve Harding
- Artist: Leon Warren
- Writer: David A. Goodman
- Composer: Rob Westwood
- Series: Lego Batman
- Platforms: Microsoft Windows; Nintendo 3DS; Nintendo DS; Xbox 360; PlayStation 3; PlayStation Vita; Wii; Wii U; OS X; iOS; Android
- Release: June 19, 2012: Windows, PS3, Wii, Xbox 360, PS Vita, 3DS, DS; NA: June 19, 2012; EU: June 22, 2012; AU: June 27, 2012; OS X; WW: September 6, 2012; Wii U; NA: May 21, 2013; EU: May 24, 2013; iOS; WW: March 25, 2013; Android; WW: March 2, 2016
- Genres: Action-adventure; Superhero fiction
- Modes: Single-player, multiplayer

Lego Batman 2: DC Super Heroes is a 2012 Lego-themed action-adventure game developed by Traveller's Tales and published by Warner Bros. Interactive Entertainment. It is a sequel to Lego Batman: The Videogame, and the second installment in the Lego Batman series. The main storyline follows Batman, Robin, and Superman as they attempt to foil the Joker and Lex Luthor's plans to have the latter become president of the United States, joining forces with the Justice League along the way. As a result, the game's cast is larger than its predecessor and includes characters outside of the Batman series.

The game is presented in a third-person perspective, with missions placing emphasis on exploration. Alongside the storyline, the player is able to complete various side missions in the fictional Gotham City to unlock new characters and use them within missions once completed. Unlike previous Lego games, which used wordless grunts, the game is the first in Traveller's Tales' series to feature spoken dialogue and an open world.

Lego Batman 2 was released worldwide for the Microsoft Windows, PlayStation 3, Wii, Xbox 360, PlayStation Vita, Nintendo 3DS and Nintendo DS in June 2012. An OS X version of the game, published by Feral Interactive, was released in September 2012, followed by a Wii U version in May 2013. A mobile version of the game, titled Lego Batman: DC Super Heroes, was released for iOS in March 2013 and for Android in March 2016. The game received generally positive reviews for most platforms, and mixed reviews for the 3DS and Vita, and sold 3.4 million copies by March 2013. A film adaptation was released on Blu-ray and DVD in May 2013. A standalone sequel, Lego Batman 3: Beyond Gotham, was released in November 2014.

== Gameplay ==
Lego Batman 2: DC Super Heroes is an action-adventure open-world game. The gameplay is similar to Lego Batman: The Videogame and presented in the third-person perspective, where the player character is allowed access through the visible elements of the 3D space they are in, although some missions force the camera to be in a 2.5D perspective. The game is set primarily within Gotham City, although Metropolis is also visited as part of a mission. The player can freely explore Gotham and unlock various characters within it. Some elements of the game's world are broken into "bricks", which the player can use to build new suits or construct objects that can help solve puzzles.

Similarly to its predecessor, the game allows Batman and Robin to alternate between various costumes with unique abilities. Here Batman is shown donning the power suit.

The combat system allows players to defeat enemies using the abilities each character provides, such as Superman's super freeze or the Joker's handbuzzer, as well as traditional combat moves like standard punches and kicks. Most enemies in the game do not carry weapons, although boss levels may have certain weapons or abilities that the player must counter. Combat rewards the player with studs, which are used to purchase new characters to utilize in the game's free roam section, and thereby contributes to their "True Hero" percentage for the mission. Some suits from Lego Batman: The Videogame return in Lego Batman 2, such as the magnetic suit for Robin, and the sonic, demolition, and sonar suits for Batman. Certain adjustments exist between the two games, including the addition of a glass-shattering gun to the glide suit (now called the bat suit), and the addition of a gun that can store water to the bio suit (now called the hazard suit). New suits available in Lego Batman 2 include the acrobat suit allowing for Robin to traverse areas that require acrobatics, the magnet suit allowing Robin to traverse areas with magnets and control magnetic elements, and the ice suit allowing Robin to freeze water. Batman's new costumes include the sensor suit allowing him to go invisible and view X-rays, the power suit allowing him to destroy silver objects and use super strength, and the electricity suit that can be used to transfer energy between switches and move through areas with electricity.

The game takes approximately 15 hours to complete, with the main missions taking 9 hours and the various extras taking 6 hours. These extras take multiple forms. One such form is Citizen in Peril, where a citizen has put themselves in a dangerous situation within the various missions that they must be saved from. Another is each mission's gold bricks, which can be obtained through destroying certain objects; a similar system exists with each mission's "minikits", wherein challenges must be completed in order to find them. Completing these various extras contributes to the game's overall completion percentage.

Once a mission has been completed, it can be replayed at any time using the various characters the player has unlocked in order to complete the aforementioned extras or to accrue more studs to purchase new characters. A local multiplayer mode is present using a split screen. The decision to use a split screen was due to the game's open-world environment. The Wii U version allows the use of the GamePad's screen instead of a split screen, allowing both players to have independent screens.

Unlike its predecessor, Lego Batman 2 features 50 playable characters from outside Gotham City, such as Superman and Wonder Woman. The Xbox 360 and PlayStation 3 versions feature exclusive downloadable content with two packs of characters, the Heroes Pack and the Villains Pack. Nightwing, Katana, Shazam, Zatanna and Damian Wayne are playable in the Heroes Pack, while Bizarro, Captain Cold, Black Adam, Black Manta and Gorilla Grodd are playable in the Villains Pack. These packs were included with pre-orders from some retailers, such as Best Buy and Amazon for the Heroes Pack, and GameStop for the Villains Pack.

== Synopsis ==
=== Characters ===
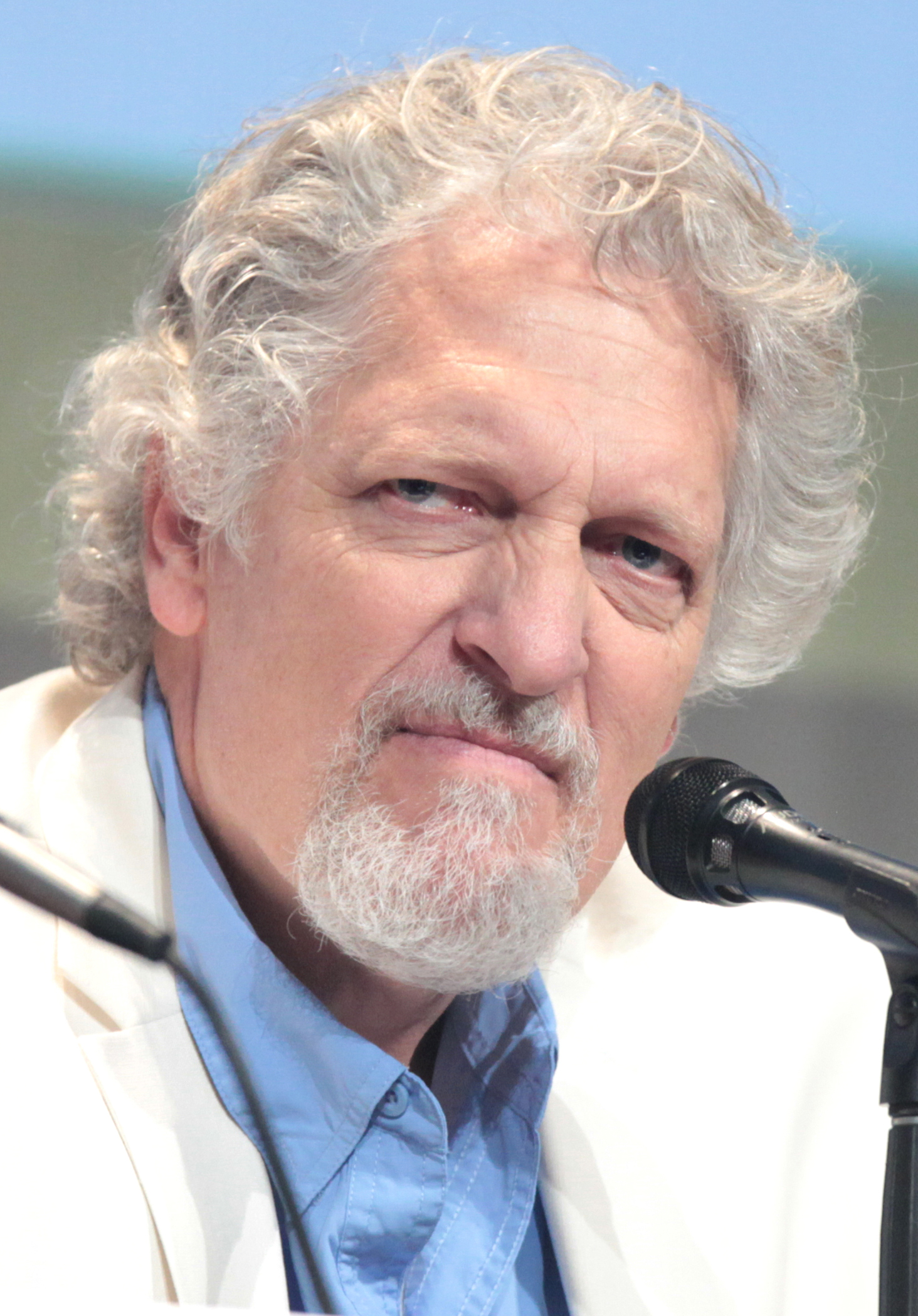
Actor Clancy Brown reprises his role as Lex Luthor from the DC Animated Universe.

Lego Batman 2 features a larger cast of characters than its predecessor and is the first Traveller's Tales Lego game to feature full spoken dialogue, as opposed to the mime acting, grunts, and mumbles of the previous games. Returning characters from Lego Batman: The Videogame include Batman (Troy Baker), Robin (Charlie Schlatter), and the Joker (Christopher Corey Smith), as well as Alfred Pennyworth (Steve Blum, who also voices Bane, Ra's al Ghul and the Penguin), Nightwing (Cam Clarke), James Gordon (Townsend Coleman, who also voices Mr. Freeze and the Mad Hatter), Clayface (Fred Tatasciore, who also voices Killer Croc and Man-Bat), the Riddler (Rob Paulsen), Harley Quinn (Laura Bailey), Scarecrow (Nolan North, who also voices Hush), Poison Ivy (also voiced by Bailey), and Catwoman (Katherine Von Till). Baker also reprises his role as Two-Face from Batman: Arkham City.

Characters new to the series include Superman (Travis Willingham), Lex Luthor (Clancy Brown, who reprises the role from the DC Animated Universe), Martian Manhunter (also voiced by Clarke), the Flash (also voiced by Schlatter), Wonder Woman (also voiced by Bailey), Green Lantern (also voiced by Clarke), Cyborg (Brian Bloom), Aquaman (also voiced by Bloom), Lois Lane (Bridget Hoffman), Supergirl (also voiced by Hoffman), Vicki Vale (Anna Vocino), and Captain Cold (also voiced by Blum, reprising his role from Batman: The Brave and the Bold). Brainiac (also voiced by Baker) makes a cameo appearance in the game, teasing his role as the main antagonist of the sequel. Clarke also served as the voice director of the game.

=== Plot ===
An award show is held in Gotham City, where Lex Luthor loses the "Man of the Year" award to Bruce Wayne. Suddenly, the ceremony is interrupted by a group of villains led by the Joker, who rob the audience and steal the award. As the Joker presents a film all about himself, which showcases his laughing gas that can make people temporarily adore him, Bruce dons the Batsuit and, with Robin's help, defeats Harley Quinn, the Riddler, Two-Face, and the Penguin. The Joker escapes via motorboat, but Batman and Robin pursue him to Amusement Mile and capture him.

As the villains are sent to Arkham Asylum, Superman arrives to congratulate Batman and Robin, much to the former's perceived chagrin. Meanwhile, Luthor, believing the Joker's gas could help him get elected president, breaks the Joker out of Arkham using the "Deconstructor", a kryptonite-powered weapon that can deconstruct unbreakable black objects. The Joker uses the Deconstructor to release more inmates before escaping with Luthor. Batman and Robin respond to Commissioner Gordon's distress call and round up the Penguin, Two-Face, Harley, the Riddler, Catwoman, Bane, and Poison Ivy in the asylum's courtyard, as well as Scarecrow inside the asylum itself, before realizing the Joker has escaped.

While responding to a break-in at Ace Chemicals, Batman and Robin realize it was the Joker's doing and search for clues, but the factory is destroyed by a series of explosive chemical reactions caused by the Joker before he left. The pair are rescued by Superman, who puts out the fire, but Batman declines his help in finding the Joker. Batman discovers the chemicals Joker stole could be mixed into synthetic kryptonite, and uses the Batmobile's on-board computer to track their signature to Luthor's mobile Juggernaut. Batman and Robin board the vehicle and confront Luthor and the Joker, but are thrown out into the street before the Joker uses the Deconstructor to destroy the Batmobile. Unable to continue the pursuit, the pair return to the Batcave to analyze a piece of synthetic kryptonite they retrieved, unaware it contains a tracking device, which Luthor and the Joker use to find them. The villains destroy the Batcave and steal Batman's supply of real kryptonite, which was their target all along. Batman and Robin are again rescued by Superman, whom the former reluctantly allows to help.

While Robin salvages what is left of Batman's equipment, Batman and Superman travel to Metropolis and infiltrate LexCorp, stumbling upon a giant Joker-esque robot piloted by Luthor and the Joker. The villains use the robot's kryptonite weapon to subdue Superman and crush Batman with a large crate, unaware that the heroes swapped costumes earlier. Quickly recovering, Batman and Superman pursue the robot and destroy its flying gear before Superman is exposed to its kryptonite power source, causing him and Batman to crash-land in Gotham. The pair make their way to the city hall, where Luthor uses the Joker's gas to make the citizens vote for him. Following another fight with the robot, Superman damages its power source, causing it to leak liquid kryptonite, but is left completely weakened. Robin arrives in a multi-colored Batmobile, which counters the Deconstructor's effects, and he and Batman trick Luthor and the Joker into chasing them around Gotham. The kryptonite creates a giant Joker face, which is seen from the Watchtower by Martian Manhunter, who summons the rest of the Justice League: Wonder Woman, Cyborg, Green Lantern, and the Flash. Once they arrive to help, Luthor concedes defeat but attempts to destroy Wayne Tower in an act of retaliation against Bruce Wayne.

Superman recovers his strength, and he and Wonder Woman try to save Wayne Tower while the others battle the Joker robot on top, sending it plummeting onto the street below. With the robot destroyed, the Joker and Luthor, who is wearing power armor, come out to fight the heroes but are ultimately defeated. Meanwhile, Green Lantern and the Flash are able to rebuild Wayne Tower's supports, stabilizing it. As the villains are arrested, Gordon thanks Batman for saving the day, to which he admits he could not have done it without his friends' help, and that he is glad to have friends that he can always count on. As the heroes prepare to rebuild the Batcave, Green Lantern shoots a beacon from his power ring into space in victory. The beacon is seen by Brainiac, who utters "I have located it".

== Development ==
=== Concept ===
The idea of a sequel to Lego Batman: The Videogame began shortly after its release. The success of the first game led TT Games to begin development of a sequel. Early in the development process, an open-world design system was considered and later built upon.

=== Design ===
The decision to include voice acting into the game was brought up by co-director Jonathan Smith, which resulted in large discussions about voice acting versus mimes and grunts from previous Lego games. After development on the cutscenes had begun, voices were inevitably added.

An idea was brought up to introduce traffic and pedestrians to Gotham City. When development on Gotham City had begun, the development team quickly had issues implementing such a system. After consideration from Jon Burton, the idea was scrapped in favor of a chaotic city with burned-up vehicles and fleeing pedestrians.

=== Music ===
An original score was written by the game's composer, Rob Westwood. In addition, the game's background music also consists of Danny Elfman's score from Batman (1989) and John Williams' score from Superman (1978).

== Marketing ==
Prior to the game's official trailer, a promo for the game was leaked online by Lego fansite Bricktuts. On March 15, 2012, the game's first reveal trailer featuring gameplay was released to the public. The reveal trailer attracted almost a million views, and another trailer was released during E3 2012, two weeks before the game's release. During the 2012 Game Developers Conference held in San Francisco, a 45-minute hands-on demo of the game was presented.

A demo was released on Xbox Live on June 19, 2012.

== Release ==
Lego Batman 2: DC Super Heroes was released in North America on June 19, 2012, for the Microsoft Windows, PlayStation 3, Wii, Xbox 360, PlayStation Vita, Nintendo 3DS and Nintendo DS, followed by a release in Europe on June 22, 2012. The game was released digitally on Windows through Steam, and later expanded to the Epic Games Store on September 19, 2019.

An OS X version of the game developed by Feral Interactive was released on September 6, 2012. TT Games later developed a port for the Wii U that was released on May 21, 2013, in North America and on May 24, 2013, in Europe. A mobile version titled Lego Batman: DC Super Heroes was released for iOS on March 25, 2013, and for Android on March 2, 2016. The Xbox 360 version of the game and its DLC later became backwards compatible for Xbox One on January 31, 2019. The game is accessible on PlayStation 4 via PS Plus Premium.

=== Downloadable content ===
Two add-on packs, the Heroes Pack and the Villains Pack, were released exclusively for the PlayStation 3 and Xbox 360 versions of the game. The Heroes Pack includes five new characters: Nightwing, Katana, Shazam, Zatanna, and Damian Wayne. The Villains Pack includes five characters as well: Bizarro, Captain Cold, Black Adam, Black Manta, and Gorilla Grodd. These packs were originally released as pre-order bonuses from certain retailers. Some of the characters from the packs were implemented in the DS, 3DS, PS Vita, and mobile versions of the game as playable characters. The DLC packs were not released for the Windows, Wii, and Wii U versions, although an unofficial mod for the Wii and Windows versions allowed the characters to be implemented into the game.

== Reception ==
Reception

Aggregate score
Aggregator	Score
Metacritic	72/100 (3DS); 81/100 (PC); 81/100 (PS3); 62/100 (Vita); 77/100 (Wii U); 79/100 (X360)

Review scores
Publication	Score
Eurogamer	9/10
Game Informer	8.25/10
GameSpot	6.5/10
GamesRadar+	4/5
IGN	8.5/10
Nintendo Life	7/10
Push Square	8/10
VentureBeat	75/100

Lego Batman 2: DC Super Heroes received mostly positive reviews. According to the review aggregation site Metacritic, the 3DS version of the game received an average review score of 72/100, the PC and PlayStation 3 versions both received a score of 81/100, the PlayStation Vita version had 62/100, the Wii U version had 77/100, and the Xbox 360 version had 79/100.

Eurogamer's Dan Whitehead gave the game a 9/10, and stated it would be an "absolute joy for adults" and "revelation" for kids. Whitehead also labeled the game as "phenomenally assured" and "pleasurable to explore". IGN's Greg Miller drew similar claims, stating the game did exploring better than any game done before it.

Game Informer's Andrew Reiner highlighted the dialogue between Batman and Robin and the narrative the game presented, in comparison to its predecessor, and appreciated the depth of Gotham City. Push Square's Mike Mason, writing about the PlayStation 3 version of the game, also brought up a similar point to the former, although experienced technical issues such as the initial time to load the game taking longer than expected and a delay when switching characters.

GameSpot's Tom McShea gave the game a less positive review, criticizing it for non-challenging AI, lackluster vehicle controls and tedious combat, although praised it for its open-world concept and visual design. Writing about the Wii U version of the game, Nintendo Life's Gaz Plant criticized the lack of improvements made and the incoherent usage of the GamePad, but like McShea also praised its open-world concept.

The Nintendo 3DS and PlayStation Vita versions of the game received mixed reviews. Nintendo Power criticized the 3DS version's lack of innovation like Plant while PlayStation: The Official Magazine criticized the Vita version's formulaic approach to the Lego series.

During the 16th Annual D.I.C.E. Awards, the Academy of Interactive Arts & Sciences nominated Lego Batman 2 for "Family Game of the Year".

=== Sales ===
According to NPD Group, Lego Batman 2 was the best-selling video game for June 2012, selling 450,000 units that month. By March 4, 2013, it was reported that Lego Batman 2 had sold 3.4 million copies.

== Legacy ==
Lego Batman 3: Beyond Gotham was announced on May 24, 2014, and released on November 11, 2014, for Android, iOS, Microsoft Windows, Nintendo 3DS, OS X, PlayStation 3, PlayStation 4, PlayStation Vita, Wii U, Xbox 360 and Xbox One. Following the events of Lego Batman 2, the story follows the Justice League as they join forces with the Legion of Doom to stop Brainiac from shrinking the Earth.

Lego DC Super-Villains was announced on May 30, 2018, and released on October 16, 2018, for Microsoft Windows, Nintendo Switch, PlayStation 4, Xbox One and OS X. It is a spin-off of the Lego Batman series following the various villains of the DC Universe as they take on the Crime Syndicate, a group of supervillains from another universe who pose as heroes in the Justice League's absence.

The idea of an open-world Gotham City seen in Lego Batman 2: DC Super Heroes returned in Lego Batman: Legacy of the Dark Knight, released on May 22, 2026, for the PlayStation 5, Windows, and Xbox Series X/S, with a version for Nintendo Switch 2 scheduled for a later date. The game combines elements from previous Lego Batman titles, as well as the Batman: Arkham series, such as the combat system.

=== Film adaptation ===
A direct-to-video film adaptation of the game was released by Warner Premiere on May 21, 2013, as Lego Batman: The Movie – DC Super Heroes Unite. The film was produced and directed by Jon Burton, co-written by Burton and David A. Goodman, and animated by TT Animation, and features the cast of the game, including Troy Baker, Charlie Schlatter, Travis Willingham, Christopher Corey Smith, Clancy Brown, Laura Bailey, Rob Paulsen, Steven Blum, Cam Clarke, Brian Bloom, Townsend Coleman, and Katherine Von Till, reprising their roles both through archival recordings from the game and new recordings. The film uses cutscenes from the game's main campaign as well as new scenes to replace gameplay.

== Bibliography ==
- Lego Batman 2: DC Super Heroes. Authored by Stephen Stratton. Published by Prima Games, 2013. ISBN 0-80416-161-5
