= Lego Batman 3: Beyond Gotham =

2014 video game

- Developers: Traveller's Tales; TT Fusion (handheld/mobile)
- Publishers: Warner Bros. Interactive Entertainment; Feral Interactive (OS X)
- Director: Arthur Parsons
- Designer: Jon Burton
- Programmers: Steve Harding; Ben Klages
- Artist: Leon Warren
- Writers: Jon Burton; David A. Goodman
- Composer: Rob Westwood
- Series: Lego Batman
- Platforms: Microsoft Windows; Nintendo 3DS; PlayStation 3; PlayStation 4; PlayStation Vita; Wii U; Xbox 360; Xbox One; OS X; iOS; Android
- Release: 11 November 2014: Windows, PS3, PS4, Wii U, X360, XONE, 3DS, Vita; NA: 11 November 2014; EU: 14 November 2014; AU: 26 November 2014; OSX; WW: 28 November 2014; iOS; WW: 25 June 2015; Android; WW: 14 August 2015
- Genre: Action-adventure
- Modes: Single-player, multiplayer

Lego Batman 3: Beyond Gotham is a 2014 Lego-themed action-adventure platform video game developed by Traveller's Tales and published by Warner Bros. Interactive Entertainment. It is the third installment in the Lego Batman video game series and a standalone sequel to Lego Batman 2: DC Super Heroes. Similarly to its predecessor, the game features voice acting and semi-open world environments, and focuses on a large cast of characters from the entire DC Universe rather than just Batman and Robin. In the game's story, Brainiac attacks the Earth, intending to shrink the planet and add it to his collection, which forces the Justice League and the Legion of Doom to form an unlikely alliance to stop him.

Lego Batman 3: Beyond Gotham was released worldwide in November 2014 for Microsoft Windows, PlayStation 3, PlayStation 4, Wii U, Xbox 360, Xbox One, Nintendo 3DS, PlayStation Vita, and OS X. A version for mobile phones excluding the numeral in the title was released for iOS in June 2015 and for Android in August 2015. The game was met with generally mixed reviews upon release. Praise was directed at the amount of content, the game's humor, and the characters, while criticism was directed at technical issues, poor AI, underwhelming celebrity cameos, conflicting gameplay aspects, and the game's overall direction. A spin-off, Lego DC Super-Villains, was released on 16 October 2018, while another game, Lego Batman: Legacy of the Dark Knight, was released on 22 May 2026.

== Gameplay ==
The core gameplay of Lego Batman 3: Beyond Gotham is very similar to that of the two previous Lego Batman games: Lego Batman: The Videogame and Lego Batman 2: DC Super Heroes. The player controls any one of a wide assortment of characters (of which there are over 150) from a third-person perspective, primarily fighting enemies, solving puzzles, and collecting Lego 'studs', the game's form of currency. Using attack combinations in combat will multiply the number of studs earned. Up to two players can play in co-operative mode.

There are many different environments in the game. All are based on DC comics' universe's locations. As in previous Lego video games, levels are unlocked for 'Free Play' mode once they are completed in Story Mode. 'Free Play' allows the player to replay any level they have completed, but with any characters they have unlocked so far. This permits access to special areas containing additional collectables, that the player was unable to get to before. This is unlike Story mode, in which the player may only switch between the preset characters involved in that scene.

There are several level hubs for the heroes in the game such as the Batcave, the 'Moon', and the Hall of Justice. Here, the player may explore and complete puzzles to find, earn or unlock 'gold bricks' or 'character tokens', access the game's main levels, and complete side quests. There are also other specific features such as enabling 'red bricks' (a form of cheat), and viewing collected 'mini kits' (which are collected in levels). Players may also create their own character using parts from characters already unlocked, as well as a limited array of weapons. The six 'Lantern Planets' are another type of explorable world in the game; they are much the same gameplay-wise as the main hub areas and levels, with the main difference being that the Lantern Planets are more open-world focused. The open world exploration on the Lantern Planets is similar to Lego Batman 2: DC Super Heroes and Lego Marvel Super Heroes.

Individual characters are able to use many unique abilities related to their comic book powers and talents. For example, Superman can fly, put out fires with his ice breath, and has heat vision (which is used to destroy gold Lego objects), the Flash is faster than other characters, the Atom can shrink his size to fit in tight spaces, Brainiac (Unlocked after finishing the main story) can shrink or enlarge objects, and Martian Manhunter and Shazam can transform from one form to another. Many characters have the same technical abilities, such as flight, transformation, speed and the ability to shoot projectiles, although, they are all visually and aesthetically different to suit the individual characters.

Players are able to swap the costumes of some of the main characters (Batman, Robin, Cyborg, the Joker, and Lex Luthor) with many differing ones, each containing unique abilities and different colour schemes. The sonic suit can break glass, the demolition suit lets the user set down and launch bombs to destroy silver Lego objects, and the hazard suit lets the user walk through toxic waste and suck up special Lego pieces which are used to progress through levels. Robin and Lex Luthor can wear the Technology suit that can activate Tech panels, and the magnet suit lets Robin, Cyborg or the Joker climb up magnetic walls and activate special switches. These suits can be changed into at any time after unlock.

== Plot ==
A year after the events of Lego Batman 2: DC Super Heroes, Brainiac captures six members of the seven "Emotional Spectrum" Lantern Corps, and heads to Earth to abduct the final one: Hal Jordan, the Green Lantern. In Gotham City, Batman and Robin pursue Killer Croc, who has stolen a map of the sewer system underneath the Hall of Justice, but he escapes and reunites with his accomplices: the Joker, Cheetah, Firefly, and Solomon Grundy. Meanwhile, Cyborg completes the "Slideways Teleporter" linking the Hall of Justice to the Justice League Watchtower and sends Green Lantern through it to meet with Martian Manhunter as a trial run, leaving the portal open.

While observing Brainiac's approaching spaceship from the Batcave, Batman is exposed to its mind-control rays and goes berserk, until Robin talks him out of the trance with a heartfelt speech; however, Batman is convinced that he was awoken from the trance by the Batmobile's defense system, which electrocuted him. Meanwhile, the villains use the stolen map to infiltrate the Hall of Justice undetected, where they meet with their benefactor, Lex Luthor, who posed as Hawkman to gain access. The group then travels to the Watchtower through the Slideways Teleporter, intending to use its fusion cannon to hold the Earth at ransom until Luthor is elected "President of Earth", but they unwittingly trigger the Watchtower's alarm. Martian Manhunter alerts the Justice League (sans Green Lantern, who was captured while investigating Brainiac's ship), and together they defeat the villains. However, Brainiac arrives and reveals his intentions to the group: to shrink the Earth with his ray, powered by the combined energies of the Lantern Corps' power rings, and add it to his collection of miniature planets.

While Superman flies into space to stop the shrink ray from reaching Earth, the remaining heroes form an uneasy alliance with the villains (who want to save the Earth so they might conquer it afterwards), and they infiltrate Brainiac's ship together, only to get captured. Robin, who is protected from Brainiac's mind-control rays by Doctor Fate's helmet, frees the others, while Superman punches his way through the shrink ray and into the ship, damaging the main computer and causing the Lanterns to be teleported back to their home planets. Deeming his ship doomed, Brainiac escapes in a smaller spacecraft to Earth (which has been only partially shrunk), and Batman, Superman, and Wonder Woman pursue him. After shrinking Paris, London, and Pisa, Brainiac attacks Gotham, but is defeated by the combined efforts of the heroes and villains, and trapped within his own ship.

To restore Earth to its original size, Superman suggests recreating the shrink ray using the crystals at the Fortress of Solitude, shards of the destroyed ray which Robin retrieved, and the energy of each Lantern's power ring. While Superman goes after the crystals and most of the villains are locked up, the other heroes and Solomon Grundy split into two groups to recruit Star Sapphire, Indigo-1, and Saint Walker to help, and confront Atrocitus, Larfleeze, and Sinestro to provoke them into following them to Earth. During a battle between the positive and negative emotions Lanterns at the Fortress, the heroes manage to harvest the combined energies of their rings and use them to power their replica of the shrink ray, using it to restore Earth to its original size; as a side effect, the Lanterns are sent back to their homeworlds once again. Meanwhile, Brainiac escapes and regains control of his ship, using it to mind-control Superman, who has grown to gigantic proportions as a result of holding the shrink ray during its activation. After all attempts to free Superman from Brainiac's control fail, Batman realizes that it was Robin's speech that helped him recover from his trance when he was exposed to the same mind-control rays, and holds a similar speech. Awakening from the trance, Superman destroys Brainiac's ship, shrinking himself back to normal proportions and the latter to a minuscule size in the process.

Later, the Justice League restore all the shrunken cities collected by Brainiac to their original locations, and capture the Legion of Doom, who escaped and took over the White House while the heroes were distracted by Brainiac's attack. Luthor and the Joker are imprisoned in the same cell as the shrunken Brainiac, but accidentally break the bottle he was held in, causing Brainiac to return to normal proportions. In the mid- and post-credits scenes, Sinestro vows revenge against the Justice League, only to bump into Wonder Woman's invisible jet; a new group of heroes arrive at the Watchtower through the Slideways Teleporter; and Hawkman, who was locked up in a cage underneath the Hall of Justice by Luthor, unsuccessfully tries to escape.

== Characters ==
The game includes over 200 characters from both the DC Universe and the returning Batman series. Conan O'Brien appears in a non-playable role as the game's guide.

== Development ==
=== Downloadable content ===
On 9 September 2014, WB Games announced a season pass that will consist of downloadable content (DLC) of levels and characters. The Season Pass is available for the PlayStation 3, PlayStation 4, Xbox One, Xbox 360, and PC versions of the game, and consists of six releases. Several other packs, not included in the season pass, have also been released.

- "Man of Steel" (Note: Included as part of the Season Pass.) (was released at launch, and is based on the 2013 film of the same name).
- "The Dark Knight" (was released at launch, and is based on Christopher Nolan's Dark Knight Trilogy).
- "Batman 75th Anniversary" (was released at launch, and follows The Joker and Harley Quinn in crashing Batman's 75th Anniversary celebration).
- "Batman of the Future" (was released on 17 December 2014, and is based on Batman Beyond).
- "Arrow" (was released on 14 January 2015, and is based on the television series of the same name).
- "Rainbow Batman" (was released for free on 20 January 2015, and includes the rainbow costume Batman character as well as the Rainbow Raider enemy).
- "Bizarro" (was released on 18 February 2015, and is based on Bizarro World and the film Lego DC Comics Super Heroes: Justice League vs. Bizarro League).
- "The Squad" (was released on 3 March 2015, and is based on the Suicide Squad).
- "Heroines and Villainesses" (was released for free on 1 April 2015; it features additional female characters of the DC Universe).

=== Voice acting ===
The game features both notable celebrity cameos, as well as various actors reprising roles from various DC properties. Conan O'Brien, Kevin Smith and Adam West appear as themselves, with O'Brien appearing as the game's 'guide', and the others as playable characters.

This was also Joe Alaskey's last role as Daffy Duck (in his Green Loontern persona) before his death on 3 February 2016.

== Reception ==
Reception

Aggregate scores
Aggregator	Score
GameRankings	(Wii U) 71.33% (PC) 73.33% (PS4) 74.04% (XONE) 75.10%
Metacritic	(PS4) 73/100 (XONE) 74/100

Review scores
Publication	Score
Destructoid	7/10
Game Informer	7.5/10
GameRevolution	3/5
GameSpot	7/10
GamesRadar+	3/5
IGN	7.4/10
VideoGamer.com	8/10

Lego Batman 3: Beyond Gotham received mostly mixed to positive reviews from critics upon release. Aggregating review website Metacritic gave both the PlayStation 4 and Xbox One versions a 74/100. GameRankings (also an aggregating review website) gave the Xbox One version a 75.10% and the PS4 version a 74.04%.

IGN's Steve Butts gave the game a 7.4 out of 10 saying "I like Lego Batman 3: Beyond Gotham, but I don't love it as much as I've loved previous games in the series. It definitely delivers on the promise of letting me play with charmingly realized versions of many of my favorite DC heroes and villains, and it even presents a setting with lots of great surprises, challenges, and systems that promote variety. As a longtime DC fan, I do wish it had given me the chance to dig into more locations and plot elements from the comics, but the biggest hurdle for me to clear is the bizarre cameos."

GamesRadar's Kate Gray awarded the game a 3 out of 5. Despite describing the controls "clunky" and the gameplay as "repetitive", Gray praised the series' formula for "still working", called the world design and technical rendering "excellent", and complimented the "zany, creative" humour. Gray stated: "Lego Batman 3 has all the ingredients of the other, enjoyable, Lego superhero games, but is let down by clunky controls, poor signposting and questionable translations of well-known comic book personalities."

Andrew Reiner from Game Informer scored the game a 7.5 out of 10, enjoying the Lego adaptation of the DC Comics Universe, but disliking the excessive exploration and out-of-place celebrity cameos. He praised the overall sound, particularly liking the blend of powerful orchestral scores and TV show theme songs, but called the voice acting a "mixed bag". Reiner also liked the gameplay tweaks, calling the item collecting process "more rewarding" and enjoying the suit transformation mechanic, even though it is sometimes tedious. "The act of smashing Lego constructs and gathering studs hasn't changed since the first Lego game", Reiner said, "and I gotta say, it's still just as much fun now as it was back in the day."

Tom Orry of VideoGamer.com scored the game an 8/10, praising the characters, amount of content, and visuals, but criticizing the game's familiarity. Orry wrote: "LEGO Batman 3 starts slow and then gets a lot better, and then overwhelms with so much content it's hard to be disappointed. It's hard to get really excited about a game that feels largely similar to how the series started with Lego Star Wars almost 10 years ago on the PlayStation 2, but DC and LEGO fans won't care as much about the sameness. For everyone else there's no doubt this is a classy package packed to the brim with content, but new ideas are definitely needed. LEGO Batman 3 eventually becomes very good but it's time the studio attempted to build a new mould."

Anthony LaBella from GameRevolution gave the game a 3.0 out of 5. She praised the number of characters, the "charming" visuals, the game's humour, and the suit mechanic for providing variety, but criticized technical inconsistencies, the game's narrative, and the lack of innovation. LaBella wrote: "Audiences already invested in the series or Lego video games in general will likely enjoy their time with Beyond Gotham, but nothing in the game elevates it beyond that status."

Cameron Woolsey of GameSpot gave the game a 7 out of 10 saying "In short, [Lego Batman 3: Beyond Gotham] is a delightful, family-friendly hop around the galaxy starring some your favorite superheroes. A wealth of hidden secrets in every level keeps the game high on replayability, while the deluge of extra content promises many hours of adventuring."

In her review for Destructoid, Caitlin Cooke gave the game a 7/10. She criticized the frustrating controls and camera, opining that they got worse later in the game, as well as the lack of an open world, feeling as though the decision to switch to multiple hubs was a downside. However, she praised the "top notch" voice acting, the faithful adaptation of the DC Universe, the TV show theme song music, which she felt creates a sense of joy, and the "delightful" humor.

During the 18th Annual D.I.C.E. Awards, the Academy of Interactive Arts & Sciences nominated Lego Batman 3 for "Family Game of the Year".

== Spin-off ==
On May 30, 2018, it was announced that the Lego Batman trilogy would receive a spin-off named Lego DC Super-Villains. It was released on 16 October 2018.
