= List of Super Friends members =

The following is an overview of the members of the DC Comics superhero team known as the Super Friends (Super Powers Team in the final season), an adaptation of the Justice League of America.

== Core Super Friends members ==
This is the list of Super Friends members who were on the show since its premiere in 1973.

=== Aquaman ===
Aquaman was a major character in the original season of the animated television series Super Friends (1973). Super Friends is often credited with having exposed Aquaman to a much wider audience outside of the comic book community. In this series, Aquaman was shown to display superhuman strength—hefting a bulldozer blade over his head, for example, and using it to help stop a tidal wave. He also had encyclopedic knowledge of oceanography and oceanology, in addition to his more familiar water-breathing power and aquatic telepathy.

However, the various successor series (Challenge of the Superfriends, The World's Greatest Super Friends, Super Friends, The Super Powers Team: Galactic Guardians) have been blamed for making Aquaman unpopular and even laughable by toning down his role and often incorrectly using him alongside other heroes. They are accused of having portrayed him in an unflattering light, as they focused almost exclusively on his water-breathing and telepathic powers, thus reinforcing a weak image of the character.

In the first two seasons of Super Friends, he was voiced by Norman Alden, and for the rest of the series he was voiced by William Callaway.

=== Batman ===
Olan Soule serves as the voice of Batman in all but the last two Super Friends series, where Batman is voiced by Adam West (who had portrayed the character in the 1960s live-action series):

- 1973 - 1974: Super Friends
- 1977 - 1978: The All-New Super Friends Hour
- 1978 - 1979: Challenge of the Superfriends
- 1979 - 1980: The World's Greatest Super Friends
- 1980 - 1983: Superfriends
- 1984 - 1985: Superfriends: The Legendary Super Powers Show
- 1985 - 1986: The Super Powers Team: Galactic Guardians

=== Robin ===
Robin (voiced by Casey Kasem) appeared alongside Batman in various Super Friends shows produced by Hanna-Barbera from 1975 through 1985. These included:

- Super Friends
- The All-New Super Friends Hour
- Challenge of the Superfriends
- The World's Greatest Super Friends
- Superfriends
- Superfriends: The Legendary Super Powers Show
- The Super Powers Team: Galactic Guardians

=== Superman ===
The various Super Friends series produced by Hanna-Barbera featured Danny Dark as Superman.

- 1973: Super Friends
- 1977: The All-New Super Friends Hour
- 1978: Challenge of the Superfriends
- 1979: The World's Greatest Super Friends
- 1980 - 1983: Superfriends
- 1984: Superfriends: The Legendary Super Powers Show
- 1985: The Super Powers Team: Galactic Guardians

==== Superboy ====
Superman's younger self, Superboy, also appears, voiced by Danny Dark in the episode "History of Doom" and Jerry Dexter in the episode "Return of the Phantoms".

=== Wonder Woman ===
Wonder Woman appeared in every incarnation of the Super Friends Saturday morning animated series. She was originally voiced by Shannon Farnon and later by Connie Caulfield in Superfriends: The Legendary Super Powers Show, followed by B.J. Ward in The Super Powers Team: Galactic Guardians.

In the Super Friends animated series, Wonder Woman's magic lasso possessed the ability to follow the telepathic commands of Wonder Woman, physically moving to accomplish tasks. In Super Friends, Wonder Woman constantly used the lasso to accomplish tasks using her strength and speed. The lasso had the ability to nulify the effects of mind control.

== Secondary Super Friends members ==
=== Cyborg ===
Cyborg appeared in The Super Powers Team: Galactic Guardians from 1985 to 1986, voiced by Ernie Hudson. Cyborg was a promising decathlon athlete until an accident destroyed most of his body and his father replaced part of his body with machine parts. He becomes fast friends with teammate Firestorm.

=== Firestorm ===
Firestorm appeared in Superfriends: The Legendary Super Powers Show and The Super Powers Team: Galactic Guardians (the last two Super Friends series). Mark L. Taylor provided Ronnie Raymond's voice while Olan Soule provided Martin Stein's voice. The crew responsible for the first series depicted the flames on Firestorm's head as a static, fire-shaped ornament. The second series' authors made another change, transforming the hair into a waved haircut.

=== Flash ===
The Flash (Barry Allen) appeared off and on in the Super Friends series throughout its run from 1973 to 1985, voiced by Ted Knight in season one and by Jack Angel from 1977 on. He initially appeared in Super Friends to help fellow Justice Leaguer, Superman. JLA members Flash, Green Lantern, and Batman eventually joined forces with Superman and the rest of the Super Friends in Challenge of the Superfriends, Superfriends: The Legendary Super Powers Show, and The Super Powers Team: Galactic Guardians.

=== Green Lantern ===
Hal Jordan was an occasional supporting character in the various Super Friends incarnations: Challenge of the Superfriends, Superfriends: The Legendary Super Powers Show, and The Super Powers Team: Galactic Guardians. Michael Rye provided the voice of Green Lantern.

Hal Jordan and his nemesis Sinestro were also regulars in Challenge of the Superfriends (as previously mentioned) which aired 1978–1979. One notable episode featured a re-telling of Jordan's origin in which the dying Abin Sur passes on his ring.

=== Hawkgirl ===
Hawkgirl (Shayera Hol (also Shayera Thal)) appeared in a few episodes of the Super Friends (between 1977 and 1983) paired alongside her husband Hawkman. She was voiced by Janet Waldo.

=== Hawkman ===
Hawkman (Katar Hol) has appeared as a Super Friend in The All-New Super Friends Hour, Challenge of the Superfriends, and The Super Powers Team: Galactic Guardians. His voice was provided by Jack Angel.

=== Ethnic And International Super Friends members ===
The Super Friends have two ethnic members and three international members. With the exception of Rima, all of these members were original characters created for Super Friends to increase the cast's ethnic diversity.

==== Apache Chief ====
Apache Chief (voiced by Michael Rye) is a Native American superhero. By speaking the Inuit word "Inyuk-chuk" ("Big Man"), Apache Chief can grow to vast sizes. In the episode "Colossus", Apache Chief grows to cosmic proportions (with the help of The Atom ) the Colossus, a titanic space creature.

==== Black Vulcan ====
Black Vulcan (voiced by Buster Jones) is African-American. His powers include the ability to emit electricity from his hands, as well as fly by charging his lower body with energy. On a few occasions, he exhibited the ability to assume a form of pure energy and travel at the speed of light. He was even able to travel back in time by fluctuating his body's energy in such a way that it opened a rift in space.

==== El Dorado ====
El Dorado (voiced by Fernando Escandon) is Hispanic and comes from an unspecified Latin country. He first appeared as a minor character in the Superfriends animated shorts, and later in Superfriends: The Legendary Super Powers Show as a full-time member.

El Dorado's most frequently used ability was teleportation, which allows him to teleport himself and anything that he covers with his cape. He also exhibited some degree of mental powers, including telepathy and the ability to create illusions.

==== Rima ====
Rima the Jungle Girl appeared in two segments of Hanna-Barbera's The All-New Super Friends Hour for the 1977-78 season and one segment of The Superfriends for the 1980-81 season, alongside such mainstays as Aquaman, Batman, and Wonder Woman. Rima was originally created for the 1904 novel Green Mansions: A Romance of the Tropical Forest, where she originated from the rainforests of South America.

==== Samurai ====
Samurai (voiced by Jack Angel) is originally from Japan. He possesses the ability to manipulate wind, which allows him to create powerful gusts and fly by creating a small tornado around his lower body.

== One-shot Super Friends members ==
The following is an overview of characters who only made one appearance on the series.

=== Green Arrow ===
The first television appearance of Green Arrow was a single guest spot in an episode of the original 1973 incarnation of Super Friends. He was voiced by Norman Alden. He was referred to as a "staunch member of the Justice League of America".

=== Plastic Man ===
Plastic Man made his animated debut in a cameo appearance in the Super Friends episode "Professor Goodfellow's G.E.E.C.", voiced by Norman Alden.

---Atom

== Junior Super Friends ==
=== Wendy and Marvin ===
Wendy Harris and Marvin White are two junior superheroes in training who were created to act as comic relief and audience surrogates. In the comics, Wendy is stated to be the niece of Harvey Harris, a detective who once trained Batman when he was still a teenager. Marvin is the son of Diana Prince, a nurse whose name Wonder Woman took as an alias. Wendy and Marvin later appeared in the main DC Comics continuity, primarily appearing in the series Teen Titans.

==== Wonder Dog ====
Wonder Dog is the pet/sidekick of Wendy and Marvin. He appears in all 16 episodes of the original television series. Wonder Dog also appeared in the first six issues of the Super Friends comic book series.

=== Wonder Twins ===
The Wonder Twins made their debut in The All-New Super Friends Hour and went on to appear in Challenge of the Superfriends, The World's Greatest Super Friends, Super Friends, and Superfriends: The Legendary Super Powers Show. Zan (voiced by Michael Bell) and Jayna (voiced by Liberty Williams) are siblings from the planet Exxor who are being informally trained by the superheroes. Zan can transform into any form of water, while Jayna can transform into any animal. Their powers are activated via contact with each other.

==== Gleek ====
Gleek (vocal effects provided by Michael Bell) is a monkey-like alien the pet of the Wonder Twins. Gleek is often used as comic relief for the series, as the character often gets into mischief. Gleek possesses a stretchable, prehensile tail and communicates in an unintelligible alien tongue.
