= The Superman/Batman Adventures =

- Advertisement for The Superman/Batman Adventures
- Based on: Superman by: Jerry Siegel; Joe Shuster; Batman by: Bob Kane; Bill Finger
- Voices of: Olan Soule; Casey Kasem; Danny Dark
- Country of origin: United States
- Original language: English
- No. of seasons: 1
- No. of episodes: 24

Production
- Running time: 60 minutes approx.
- Production companies: Filmation; Hanna-Barbera; DC Comics

Original release
- Network: USA

Related
- The Batman/Superman Hour; The Superman/Aquaman Hour of Adventure; Super Friends

The Superman/Batman Adventures is an animated television series that aired on USA Network in 1995. It was later aired on Cartoon Network and Boomerang. The episodes were edited from various seasons of the Hanna-Barbera-produced Super Friends, as well as Filmation's 1960s series The New Adventures of Superman, The Superman/Aquaman Hour of Adventure, and The Batman/Superman Hour.

The Superman/Batman Adventures included for the first time on American television the "lost episodes" of the 1983–1984 season of Super Friends.

== Cast ==
=== Main cast ===
Actor	Role
Olan Soule	Bruce Wayne / Batman
Bud Collyer/Danny Dark	Kal-El / Clark Kent / Superman
Casey Kasem	Dick Grayson / Robin
Shannon Farnon	Wonder Woman
Marvin Miller/Norman Alden/William Callaway	Aquaman
Joan Alexander/Julie Bennett	Lois Lane
Jack Grimes	Jimmy Olsen
Ted Knight/William Woodson/John Henry Kurtz	Narrator

=== Major antagonists ===
Actor	Role
Ray Owens	Lex Luthor
Ted Knight	The Joker; Penguin; Riddler; Mr. Freeze and Black Manta
Jane Webb	Catwoman
Cliff Owens	Brainiac
Paul Frees	Evil Star
Frank Welker	Mr. Mxyzptlk

=== Supporting characters ===
Actor	Role
Gerald Mohr/Michael Rye	Green Lantern
Bob Hastings	Superboy
Vic Perrin/Jack Angel	Hawkman
Pat Harrington, Jr./Wally Burr	The Atom
Tommy Cook	Kid Flash
Diana Maddox	Mera
Janet Waldo	Lana Lang
Julie Bennett	Wonder Girl
Cliff Owens	The Flash
Jackson Beck	Perry White
Jerry Dexter	Aqualad

== See also ==
- The New Batman/Superman Adventures
