= List of Super Friends supporting characters =

The following is an overview of the various characters that were secondary (therefore, recurring) to the main characters in the animated Super Friends series.

== Batman supporting characters ==
=== Commissioner James Gordon ===
James Gordon makes two appearances in Super Friends. He first appears in the Challenge of the Superfriends episode "Super Friends, Rest in Peace", voiced by Danny Dark. Riddler and Cheetah hold Gordon hostage so they can kill Batman with the Noxium Crystal.

Gordon later appears in The Super Powers Team: Galactic Guardians episode "The Fear". Along with Jonathan Crane, Gordon is trying to find and arrest Scarecrow. Gordon and Batman are both unaware that Crane is the Scarecrow.

He also appeared in some of the comics related to the show.

=== Alfred Pennyworth ===
William Callaway voices Alfred Pennyworth in Challenge of the Superfriends. Andre Stojka voices the character in The Super Powers Team: Galactic Guardians episode "The Fear".

== Flash supporting characters ==
=== Solovar ===
Solovar appears in the Challenge of the Superfriends episode "Revenge on Gorilla City", voiced by Michael Rye. He is an intelligent gorilla from Gorilla City and an enemy of Gorilla Grodd, who also originates from the city.

== Green Lantern (Hal Jordan) supporting characters ==
=== Abin Sur ===
Abin Sur appears in the Challenge of the Superfriends episode "Secret Origins of the Super Friends", voiced by Dick Ryal. He is the Green Lantern of Sector 2814 and the predecessor of Hal Jordan. Sur was mortally wounded in an aircraft crash and gave his ring to Jordan.

== Superman supporting characters ==
=== Lois Lane ===
Lois Lane makes several appearances in the Super Friends series. Lois makes an appearance in "Super Friends, Rest in Peace" from the Challenge of the Superfriends season. In The World's Greatest Super Friends season, Lois appears in the episode "Lex Luthor Strikes Back". She appeared on the 1980s episode "The Ice Demon". Lois also makes cameo appearances in the Super Friends: The Legendary Super Powers Show episode "The Bride of Darkseid" and "Reflections in Crime".

=== Jimmy Olsen ===
In The World's Greatest Super Friends episode "Lex Luthor Strikes Back", Lex Luthor's henchman Orville Gump poses as Jimmy Olsen.

=== Perry White ===
Perry White appears in the Challenge of the Superfriends episode "Superfriends, Rest In Peace", where Superman tries to rescue him and Lois Lane from Lex Luthor and Solomon Grundy.

== Wonder Woman supporting characters ==
=== Queen Hippolyta ===
Hippolyta appears in the Challenge of the Superfriends episodes "Secret Origins of the Super Friends" and "Super Friends: Rest in Peace". Hippolyta later appears in the Super Friends (1980) episode "Return of Atlantis", where she is depicted as blonde.

=== Steve Trevor ===
Steve Trevor makes a cameo appearance in the Super Friends: The Legendary Super Powers Show episode "Mr. Mxyzptlk and the Magic Lamp". Trevor later appears in The Super Powers Team: Galactic Guardians episode "The Darkseid Deception", where he is voiced by Darryl Hickman and established to be an astronaut.

== Other characters ==
Colonel Wilcox, a U.S. Army official, is a recurring character in the first season who works as a government liaison to the Super Friends during emergencies.
