= Imaginext =

Toy brand

Imaginext System
- Company: Mattel
- Country: USA
- Availability: 1998–present

The Imaginext System is a brand of role-playing, adventure toys designed for kids 3 or older made by Mattel, under the label of Fisher-Price.

== History ==
At the time of its introduction at the 1998 Toy Fair, the Imaginext System included only two themed worlds: medieval and city venues. The original medieval line attempted to capture the action of battle with its fortresses, dungeons, knights, wizards, and dragons and featured the Battle Castle play set as well as several knight and wizard action figures sold separately. This line quickly expanded to incorporate the Wizard's Tower and Goblin's Dungeon play sets.

The other Imaginext line that was released in 2002 attempted to capture life in the big city with a focus on emergency and rescue figures and play sets. The Imaginext Rescue Center was the initial lead play set of the rescue line which, like the medieval line, quickly expanded. The rescue world soon included a police station and sea rescue center with a number of additional figures and accessories—a mounted police officer, an EMT, and a deep sea diver to name a few. Compared to the medieval line, the Imaginext rescue world was rather short-lived. In 2003, it would be supplemented by a construction-themed world. Construction worker and mechanic figures and accessories complemented the rescue world's urban theme.

In 2003, the Imaginext brand released a pirate (or sea) line. The line was popularized by its two lead playsets: Pirate Raider and Buccaneer Bay. A glow-in-the-dark Pirate Crew figure pack (also released in 2003) became so popular that an entire phantom line was developed and released in 2004. In contrast to the pirate line, the phantom figures were all glow-in-the-dark and had skeletal bodies. In 2004, a dinosaur world was added to the Imaginext repertoire.

In Fall 2006, the Imaginext brand was renamed Imaginext Adventures, marking a shift in design and production of Imaginext toys. A number of Imaginext playsets were redesigned to feature figure-activated buttons and switches that with various functions (a pirate figure, when placed on one such site on the Pirate Raider, can be used to extend the plank or lower the sails). Several of these playsets could even be purchased fully assembled. The new figures appeared rather larger than the original figures. In 2008, Imaginext released new figures such as Superman and Batman as well as many other DC universe characters. New playsets like the Batcave were created. By 2011, Imaginext no longer released Superman but continued to release new Batman play sets that included villains and vehicles. Imaginext also produced adventure sets that included knights, dragons, and castles, similar to its original sets.

== Dinosaurs ==
In 2004, the Dinosaurs line was introduced. Following in the footsteps of the castle line, the Imaginext dinosaurs were divided into rival sects: the predators—whose goal is to wipe out the world's natural resources—and the ecovores—who fight to preserve the land. In later iterations of the line, this narrative was rejected.

The Dinosaurs line consisted of traditional Imaginext playsets, as well as motorized, battery-operated dinosaurs that walked and roared when a button was pressed.

Spike the Ultra Dinosaur, an interactive remote-control toy, was released in 2008. Spike was a green "ultra dinosaur" with a long, sauropod-like neck, as well as stegosaur-like thagomizers on his tail. The toy came with a plastic remote shaped like a rock that could be used to control Spike, as well as plastic balls and a bone. Spike the Ultra Dinosaur was followed up by Spike Jr., a smaller version of Spike that worked more similarly to the other motorized dinosaurs. A red version of Spike was exclusively sold at Target stores. Spike was discontinued in 2011.

A game for the iXL, a Fisher-Price handheld gaming console, was released in 2010. Simply titled "Imaginext", the game was themed around the Dinosaurs line.

In 2011, the Dinosaurs line went through a redesign, with the dinosaurs being given futuristic equipment. Another change occurred in 2015, with the futuristic aesthetic being rejected and the original "primitive" aesthetic from 2005 returning.

The Dinosaurs line was rebranded into Jurassic World in 2018, coinciding with the release of Jurassic World: Fallen Kingdom.

== Bigfoot the Monster ==
Bigfoot the Monster was released in 2010. Similarly to Spike, he was an interactive remote-control toy designed to resemble the cryptid bigfoot.

== Worlds ==
The Imaginext Worlds include, but are not limited to, DC Super Friends, Dragons, Robot Police, SpongeBob SquarePants, and Jurassic World. In 2011, the Samurai world was created. Previous worlds include Jungle, Forest, Castle, Pirate, City, Toy Story and Power Rangers (2015-2018) (now owned by Hasbro).

== DC Super Friends ==
One of the most popular divisions in the line is "DC Super Friends". Although its name is similar to the 1970s and 80s TV series simply called Super Friends, it is not directly connected to it. This world has 27 sets (not including exclusives): Batcave, Planet Oa, Motorized Batmobile, Joker's Fun House, Batwing, Batboat, Batcopter, Batmobile, Green Lantern Jet, Riddler Car, Clayface, Batmobile with Lights, Penguin Sub, Killer Croc, Hawkman and the Flash, Two-Face, the Riddler, Robin Cycle, Batcycle, Arctic Batman, Mr. Freeze, The Penguin, The Joker, Superman, and Batman. A Gotham Jail, Bat-Jetpack, New Motorized Batmobile, and a new Joker Tank, were planned to be released in summer and late spring.

In May 2008, DC Comics produced an ongoing monthly comic book series based on the toyline, which ran for 29 issues.

In 2010, an original video animation based on the line named The Joker's Playhouse was included on a DVD packaged with toys. Directed and produced by Ciro Nieli and written by Brandon Auman, the story involves the Joker taking over the Hall of Justice and the Super Friends running the gauntlet to reclaim it. The main theme for the show is the same as The World's Greatest Super Friends and the opening sequence borrows from the original Super Friends series and Challenge of the Superfriends.

In 2012, Imaginext released new DC Super Friends figures and play sets to be sold for the release of The Dark Knight Rises. This includes Bane, Bruce Wayne, Gotham City, Gotham City Jail, The Motorized Batmobile and Mr. Freeze's Headquarters.

In 2013, Imaginext began to introduce females into its toyline featuring Catwoman, Wonder Woman and Harley Quinn. Imaginext also began producing toys based on the DC Extended Universe, such as Superman, Aquaman, Cyborg, and Commissioner Gordon.

In 2015, Imaginext released a host of new sets and figures. This includes Sinestro, Cheetah, Firestorm, Man-Bat, Solomon Grundy and Captain Cold.

== Animated series ==
From 2011 to 2012, a series of 7 episodes were released as a television series that aired on Nickelodeon. In 2013, a new webseries was released with new characters entitled Imaginext Adventures, this series had only 4 episodes.

=== Imaginext Adventures (2013-2014) ===
1. Through the Crystal Eye - 9/12/13 (story: Kevin Mowrer, teleplay: Thomas Pugsley)
2. Hot Time in the City - 10/14/13 (story: Kevin Mowrer, teleplay: Thomas Pugsley)
3. Dino Might - 2/12/14 (story: Kevin Mowrer, teleplay: Marty Isenberg)
4. All Are One - 4/9/14 (story: Kevin Mowrer, teleplay: Thomas Pugsley)
