= The World's Greatest SuperFriends =

- Genre: Adventure; Superhero
- Created by: E. Nelson Bridwell; Carmine Infantino; Julius Schwartz (consultants)
- Based on: Justice League by Gardner Fox
- Written by: Jeffrey Scott; Bob Kane; William Moulton Marston; Joe Shuster; Jerry Siegel
- Directed by: Ray Patterson; Oscar Dufau; Carl Urbano; George Gordon
- Creative director: Iwao Takamoto
- Voices of: Michael Bell; William Callaway; Danny Dark; Shannon Farnon; Casey Kasem; Olan Soule; Louise "Liberty" Williams
- Narrated by: William Woodson
- Theme music composer: Hoyt Curtin
- Composers: Hoyt Curtin; Paul DeKorte
- Country of origin: United States
- Original language: English
- No. of episodes: 8 (list of episodes)

Production
- Executive producers: William Hanna; Joseph Barbera
- Producer: Don Jurwich
- Editor: Nancy Massie (color key)
- Running time: 22 minutes
- Production companies: Hanna-Barbera Productions; DC Comics

Original release
- Network: ABC
- Release: September 22, 1979 – September 27, 1980

Related
- Super Friends (1973); The All-New Super Friends Hour; Challenge of the Superfriends; Super Friends (1980); Super Friends: The Legendary Super Powers Show; The Super Powers Team: Galactic Guardians

The World's Greatest SuperFriends is an American animated television series about a team of superheroes that ran from September 22, 1979, to September 27, 1980, on ABC. It was produced by Hanna-Barbera Productions and is based on the Justice League and associated comic book characters published by DC Comics.

== Summary ==
This particular incarnation of Super Friends took inspiration from folklore and classic fairy tales for its plots. One episode in particular, "The Lord of Middle Earth", was inspired by the novel The Lord of the Rings, in which the team journeys to Middle-earth to save the inhabitants from an evil wizard. The series also borrowed from (then) contemporary politics. Kareem Azar, the villain in the episode "Rub Three Times for Disaster", is loosely inspired by Iranian religious leader Ayatollah Ruhollah Khomeini. A number of the episodes feature members who only appear in cameos.

== Characters ==
- Superman – the Supermobile appeared in the episode "Lex Luthor Strikes Back". In the episode "Terror at 20,000 Fathoms", Superman gives Aquaman, the Wonder Twins and Gleek a guided tour of the Fortress of Solitude showing off many structures such as the bottled city of Kandor.
- Batman
- Robin
- Wonder Woman
- Aquaman
- Wonder Twins
- Gleek

== Cast ==
- Marlene Aragon - Wicked Witch of the Worst-Kind (in "The Planet of Oz")
- Michael Bell – Zan, Gleek, Hellion (in "Lex Luthor Strikes Back"), Gore (in "The SuperFriends Meet Frankenstein"), Logan (in "Space Knights of Camelon"), Kareem Azar's Henchman (in "Rub Three Times for Disaster"), Taskmaster (in "The Lord of Middle Earth"), Gorka (in "The Lord of Middle Earth), Spider Creature (in "The Lord of Middle Earth"), Evil Gleek (in "Universe of Evil"), Frightened Citizen (in "The SuperFriends Meet Frankenstein")
- William Callaway – Aquaman, Orville Gump (in "Lex Luthor Strikes Back"), Evil Aquaman (in "Universe of Evil"), Frightened Citizen (in "The SuperFriends Meet Frankenstein")
- Danny Dark – Superman, Rebel (in "Space Knights of Camelon"), Soldier (in "Rub Three Times for Disaster"), Evil Superman (in "Universe of Evil"), Carron (in "Terror at 20,000 Fathoms")
- Shannon Farnon – Wonder Woman, Lois Lane (in "Lex Luthor Strikes Back"), Camelon Villager (in "Space Knights in Camelon"), Evil Wonder Woman (in "Universe of Evil"), Sergeant Ritter (in "Universe of Evil"), Dorrell (in "Terror at 20,000 Fathoms"), Dr. Pali (in "The SuperFriends Meet Frankenstein")
- Pat Fraley - Sir James (in "Space Knights of Camelon"), Rebel (in "Space Knights of Camelon")
- Bob Holt - Captain Nemoy (in "Terror at 20,000 Fathoms"), Wizard of Oz (in "The Planet of Oz")
- Stan Jones - Lex Luthor (in "Lex Luthor Strikes Back"), Kareem Azar (in "Rub Three Times for Disaster"), Fortress Guard (in "Rub Three Times for Disaster"), Submarine Captain (in "Rub Three Times for Disaster"), Computer Override Circuit (in "Terror at 20,000 Fathoms"), Dr. Frankenstein (in "The SuperFriends Meet Frankenstein"), Frightened Citizen (in "The SuperFriends Meet Frankenstein"), Monorail Driver (in "The SuperFriends Meet Frankenstein")
- Casey Kasem – Robin, Kareem Azar's Henchman (in "Rub Three Times for Disaster"), Evil Robin (in "Universe of Evil")
- James Reynolds - African Leader (in "Terror at 20,000 Fathoms"), Mivor (in "Terror at 20,000 Fathoms")
- Stanley Ralph Ross - Frankenstein's Monster (in The SuperFriends Meet Frankenstein"), Super Monster (in "The SuperFriends Meet Frankenstein"), Mal Havoc (in "The Lord of Middle Earth"), Genie of Olam (in "Rub Three Times for Disaster"), Cave Monster (in "The Lord of Middle Earth")
- Michael Rye - King Arthur 7 (in "Space Knights of Camelon"), Ogar (in "Space Knights of Camelon"), Kareem Azar's Henchman (in "Rub Three Times for Disaster"), Scientist (in "Rub Three Times for Disaster")
- Olan Soule – Batman, Dr. Simms (in "The SuperFriends Meet Frankenstein"), O'Brien (in "Rub Three Times for Disaster"), London Citizen (in "Rub Three Times for Disaster"), Evil Batman (in "Universe of Evil"), Android Batman (in "Terror at 20,000 Fathoms"), Joseph's Friend (in "The SuperFriends Meet Frankenstein"), Magic Mirror (in "The Planet of Oz")
- Vernee Watson-Johnson - Uninversity Scientist (in "Universe of Evil")
- Frank Welker - Mister Mxyzptlk (in "The Planet of Oz"), Crows (in "The Planet of Oz"), Wild Boars (in "The Planet of Oz"), Hour Glass Cult Members (in "The Planet of Oz")
- Louise "Liberty" Williams – Jayna, Kana (in "Terror at 20,0000 Fathoms")
- William Woodson – Narrator, The Sultan of Zagdad (in "Rub Three Times for Disaster"), Kareem Azar's Henchman (in "Rub Three Times for Disaster"), Vol (in "Lex Luthor Strikes Back"), Warden McGee (in "Lex Luthor Strikes Back"), Little William (in "Space Knights of Camelon"), Poor Camelon Villager (in "Space Knights of Camelon"), Baldiskam (in "The Lord of Middle Earth"), South American Villager (in "Universe of Evil"), Air Force General (in "Terror at 20,000 Fathoms), Joseph (in "The SuperFriends Meet Frankenstein"), Dreadsylvania Official (in "The SuperFriends Meet Frankenstein")

== Episodes ==
| No. overall | No. in season | Title | Original release date |
|---|---|---|---|
| 48 | 1 | "Rub Three Times for Disaster" | September 22, 1979 |
Kareem Azaar is a ruthless thief on the planet Zaghdad who has stolen the Magic Lamp of Olam, which contains the power of an evil genie. Kareem uses the Genie's power to take over the planet and banish the Sultan into the world of the Genie's lamp. When the Super Friends arrive to do battle, Superman and the Wonder Twins wind up in the lamp as well, leaving the other heroes to take on Kareem's forces, only for Kareem to get caught by the Superfriends. Note: Starting with this episode, the "Super Friends" logo has a metallic cosmic silver look to it. Also, the title card background changes to one with an orange background that has the four adult heroes floating at the top.
| 49 | 2 | "Lex Luthor Strikes Back" | September 29, 1979 |
Lex Luthor uses a projector ray (reverse camera) to disguise himself as Lois Lane in order to escape from prison. Luthor and his assistant Orville Gump, hatch an elaborate plot to destroy the Super Friends. Luthor aligns himself with evil fire aliens who originate from the sun. They aid Luthor in capturing the Super Friends and placing them in death traps. The aliens then change the color of the sun from yellow to red, which cause Superman's powers to vanish, but the Sun Creatures double-cross Luthor and he is trapped in a fire, so he has no choice but to free the Super Friends in an effort to save himself and Earth. The Super Friends perform rescues and put out the fires. Superman uses the Supermobile to chase the fire aliens back into the sun, which causes the sun to return to its natural color and restores Superman's powers. Luthor and Orville are sent back to prison. Note: Orville Gump is based on Otis, the character played by Ned Beatty in the 1978 film Superman. The film also provided the model for Luthor's subterranean lair in this episode.
| 50 | 3 | "Space Knights of Camelon" | October 6, 1979 |
While protecting a prehistoric planet from a meteor, Superman ends up hit by the meteor's nuclear core, crash lands on the medieval planet of Camelon, and loses his memory. A bunch of rebels led by Logan take Superman in as their Black Knight in a plan to overthrow King Arthur 7. It is up to the Super Friends to help Superman remember who he is and defeat the rebels. Note: This episode, the 1st season episode "The Power Pirate" and the Challenge of the Superfriends episode "Sinbad and the Space Pirates" are the only episodes in the Super Friends series where Wonder Woman's magic lasso exhibits truth-compelling power like in the live-action Wonder Woman television series, which was canceled when CBS ended its third season a month earlier.
| 51 | 4 | "The Lord of Middle Earth" | October 13, 1979 |
What starts off as a camping trip for the Wonder Twins turns into a nightmarish adventure in Middle Earth when the Super Friends must battle a black magic sorcerer named Mal Havoc who has taken over the troll kingdom. Mal Havoc uses his magic to turn the Super Friends into trolls. With their powers reduced, Batman and Wonder Woman accompany the troll king on a mission to free Middle Earth of the evil sorcerer.
| 52 | 5 | "Universe of Evil" | October 20, 1979 |
In a parallel universe, the Super Friends are supervillains, the Super Enemies. Mount Vesuvius is a focal point that links the two universes -- in one universe, Superman tries to stop the eruption, while his evil counterpart is causing the same disaster in his own reality. Vesuvius explodes, causing the two Supermen to exchange universes. While Superman has to fight the evil Super Enemies and authorities that see him as a villain to find a way back to his own world, his evil counterpart battles the heroic Super Friends and begins his plan to conquer Earth.
| 53 | 6 | "Terror at 20,000 Fathoms" | October 27, 1979 |
The evil Captain Nimoy plots to use nuclear warhead missiles to sink continents below the sea where he plans to rule. Nimoy is aided by an android duplicate of Batman to help him out, but with Superman and Wonder Woman away on a space mission, the Super Friends are aided by Superman's tiny Kryptonian friends from the bottle city of Kandor.
| 54 | 7 | "The Super Friends Meet Frankenstein" | November 3, 1979 |
When a descendant of the original Dr. Frankenstein abducts and steals the powers of Batman, Superman and Wonder Woman and transfers them into his latest creation, it is up to Robin to stop the Super-Monster. Robin transfers the remaining powers into himself, battles Frankenstein's super-powered monster, then manages to restore the Super Friends' powers.
| 55 | 8 | "The Planet of Oz" | November 10, 1979 |
After the Wonder Twins and the Dynamic Duo find out they are not able to get rid of a tornado, the storm transports the Hall of Justice to the Land of Oz, where the Super Friends encounter Mr. Mxyzptlk. Mxyzptlk has once again escaped from the Fifth Dimension and informs the Super Friends that they must find the Wizard to get home. Along the way, they encounter the Wicked Witch of the Worst Kind in a gingerbread house, who turns Aquaman into the Scarecrow, Superman into the Tin Man, and Wonder Woman into the Lion.

== DC Super Friends ==
The main title theme for the direct-to-video original animation DC Super Friends: The Joker's Playhouse (2010) is from the World's Greatest SuperFriends.

== Home media ==
The complete season four was released on DVD titled The World's Greatest Super Friends: And Justice for All as a Target exclusive on April 23, 2013. It was scheduled to be a general retail release ("at all sellers who decide to participate") starting November 12 the same year.
