= Super Friends (1980 TV series) =

- Genre: Action; Adventure; Science fiction
- Based on: Justice League by Gardner Fox
- Written by: Haskell Barkin; Dick Conway; Willie Gilbert; Donald F. Glut; Mark Jones; Elana Lesser; Dick Robbins; Cliff Ruby
- Directed by: Oscar Dufau; George Gordon; Charles A. Nichols; Ray Patterson; Carl Urbano
- Voices of: Jack Angel; Michael Bell; Wally Burr; William Callaway; Danny Dark; Shannon Farnon; Buster Jones; Stan Jones; Casey Kasem; Michael Rye; Olan Soule; Frank Welker; Louise Williams
- Narrated by: William Woodson
- Theme music composer: Hoyt Curtin
- Composer: Hoyt Curtin
- Country of origin: United States
- Original language: English
- No. of seasons: 3
- No. of episodes: 22 (66 segments) (list of episodes)

Production
- Executive producers: Joseph Barbera; William Hanna
- Producer: Gerard Baldwin
- Editor: Jeffrey Scott
- Running time: 21–23 minutes (7 minutes per segment)
- Production companies: Hanna-Barbera Productions; DC Comics

Original release
- Network: ABC
- Release: September 13, 1980 – October 29, 1983

Related
- Super Friends (1973); The All-New Super Friends Hour; Challenge of the Superfriends; The World's Greatest SuperFriends; Super Friends: The Legendary Super Powers Show; The Super Powers Team: Galactic Guardians

Super Friends is an American animated television series about a team of superheroes which ran from 1980 to 1983 on ABC. It was produced by Hanna-Barbera Productions and is based on the Justice League and associated comic book characters published by DC Comics. It was the fifth incarnation of the Super Friends series following Super Friends (1973), The All-New Super Friends Hour (1977), Challenge of the Superfriends (1978) and The World's Greatest SuperFriends (1979).

== Format ==
With Super Friends, the series abandoned the production of half-hour episodes (which was the case for the previous two Super Friends series), in favor of the production of seven-minute shorts. During the original airings, each episode would be followed by a half-hour rerun from one of the previous six years. Meanwhile, the second season from 1981–1982 was a shorter season due to a writers' strike.

=== Main characters ===
These new adventures featured appearances by the core group of the five classic Super Friends (Aquaman, Batman, Robin, Superman and Wonder Woman) along with the Wonder Twins and Gleek. A 1981 episode titled "Evil from Krypton" depicted the Superman's Fortress of Solitude with a somewhat crystalline exterior and without the giant key, reminiscent of its film appearances. There were also guest appearances from members previously depicted in Challenge of the Superfriends as well as El Dorado (debuting in the second season), who was created for the series to add racial diversity.

In El Dorado's debut episode "Alien Mummy", it is revealed that he is of a Mexican descent. The narrator sets the scene by describing the location as 'ancient Aztec ruins in the Mexican wilderness'. One of El Dorado's lines is "these are the mysterious ruins of my people".

== Guest characters and villains ==
The Riddler made his only solo appearance in a short episode entitled "Around The World In 80 Riddles" again voiced by Michael Bell. Queen Hippolyta as well as Paradise Island appear in the 1980 episode "Return of Atlantis". In her first two appearances, Hippolyta was a brunette but in her last appearance, she was blonde and wore a blue toga. Gorilla Grodd appeared in the short episodes "Two Gleeks Are Deadlier Than One" and "Revenge of Doom" again voiced by Stanley Ralph Ross. In "Two Gleeks are Deadlier Than One", he and Giganta capture Gleek and replace him with a robot duplicate in order to infiltrate the Super Friends and learn what they are planning. In "Revenge of Doom", Gorilla Grodd was seen with the Legion of Doom when they got back together (after salvaging the Legion of Doom headquarters from the swamp and refurbishing it). While all 13 LOD members appear in "Revenge of Doom", only Lex Luthor, Sinestro (voiced this time by Jeff Winkless) and Solomon Grundy (again voiced by Jimmy Weldon) speak.

The three Phantom Zone villains, who first appeared in the 1978 episode "Terror from the Phantom Zone", later return in a "lost season" episode from 1983 titled "Return of the Phantoms". In it they hijack an alien's time-space conveyor and go back in time to Smallville and attack Superboy (voiced by Jerry Dexter) to prevent him from becoming Superman. Fortunately, the pilot of that craft went to warn the Super Friends about what the trio would be attempting and guided Superman and Green Lantern to the proper time period to help the boy. The Super Friends version of the Phantom Zone is described as: "Far beyond the boundaries of the Milky Way. In the uncharted void of deep space. An incredible 5th dimension of space and time, lies parallel to the universe that we know. This interesting interstellar warp which holds the most sinister and ruthless criminals in the galaxy is the infamous Phantom Zone". The molecular structure of any person exiled in the Zone appears white and black. Batman's devices and the Wonder Twins' powers are useless within the Phantom Zone.

== Cast ==
- Norman Alden – N/A (credit only)
- Michael Ambrosini – Dr. Rashid Ardri (in "Scorpio")
- Jack Angel – Hawkman, Samurai, Flash (Barry Allen), Chief (in "Bigfoot"), J. S. Snyder (in "The Make-Up Monster"), Spike (in "Cycle Gang"), Gramps (in "Cycle Gang"), Submarine Captain (in Dive To Disaster"), Mayor Summers (in "An Unexpected Treasure")
- Marlene Aragon – Cathleen (in "Attack of the Cats")
- Lewis Bailey – N/A (credit only)
- Jered Barclay – Diamond Jack (in "The Sink Hole"), Octoman (in "Warpland")
- Michael Bell – Zan, Riddler (in "Around the World In 80 Riddles"), Gleek, Bobby (in "Cycle Gang"), Rom-Lok (in "Return of the Phantoms"), Glook (in "Invasion of the Gleeks")
- Wally Burr – Atom
- Greg Burson – Keelhaul Kelly (in "The Scaraghosta Sea")
- Bill Callaway – Aquaman, Bizarro
- Kathy Carver – Rima (in "Return of Atlantis"), Ocina (in "Return of Atlantis")
- Ted Cassidy – N/A (credit only)
- Melanie Chartoff – N/A (credit only)
- Philip Lewis Clarke – Jor-El (in "The Krypton Syndrome"), Frank (in "Prisoners of Sleep")
- Henry Corden – N/A (credit only)
- Regis Cordic – N/A (credit only)
- Peter Cullen – John Palette (in "Palette's Perils"), Slarum Leader (in "Day of the Dinosaurs")
- Danny Dark – Superman/Clark Kent
- Jerry Dexter – Superboy (in "Return of the Phantoms"), Frankie (in "The Roller Coaster"), Eric (in "An Unexpected Treasure")
- Takayo Doran – Witch (in "The Witch's Arcade)
- Jeff Doucette – Hippo Hulk (in "Warpland")
- Patty Dworkin – Hippolyta (in "Return of Atlantis"), Divina (in "Return of Atlantis")
- Richard Erdman – Grimes (in "Garden of Doom"), Space Genie (in "Three Wishes")
- Fernando Escandon – El Dorado
- Al Fann – N/A (credit only)
- Shannon Farnon – Wonder Woman
- Aileen Fitzpatrick – Yuna (in "Yuna the Terrible")
- Ruth Forman – N/A (credit only)
- Pat Fraley – N/A (credit only)
- Peggy Frees – Girl (in "The Make-Up Monster")
- Brian Fuld – Ralph (in "The Roller Coaster")
- Joan Gerber – Giganta (in "Two Gleeks are Deadlier Than One")
- Nicholas Guest – Dennis (in "The Roller Coaster")
- Phil Hartman – Stardust (in "Outlaws of Orion")
- Bob Hastings – N/A (credit only)
- Bob Holt – Holmes (in "Haunted House"), Logar (in "Return of the Phantoms")
- John Hostetter – Blob (in "The Malusian Blob"), Fax (in "Space Racers")
- Erv Immerman – Professor Stevens (in "Attack of the Cats")
- Jane James – N/A (credit only)
- Joyce Jameson – Judy (in "Garden of Doom")
- David Jolliffe – Alien Time Traveler (in "Return of the Phantoms")
- Buster Jones – Black Vulcan
- Stanley Jones – Lex Luthor (in "Revenge of Doom"), Hul (in "Return of the Phantoms")
- Casey Kasem – Robin
- Zale Kessler – Mohawk Spirit (in "Once Upon a Poltergeist"), Bat Computer (in "Once Upon a Poltergeist")
- Morgan Lofting – Dr. Gibbs (in "The Scaraghosta Sea")
- Allan Lurie – Zi-Kree (in "The Evil From Krypton")
- Joyce Mancini – N/A (credit only)
- Larry D. Mann – Itsy/Iron Cyclops (in "The Iron Cyclops")
- Kenneth Mars – Bud (in "The Make-Up Monster"), Warlord (in "The Warlord's Amulet")
- Bill Martin – Technos (in "Day of the Dinosaurs")
- Ross Martin – N/A (credit only)
- Amanda McBroom – Vampiress (in "Voodoo Vampire"), Tigress (in "The Circus of Horror")
- Chuck McCann – Colossus (in "Colossus")
- Chuck McClennan – N/A (credit only)
- Julie McWhirter – Lois Lane (in "The Ice Demon"), Kate (in "The Ice Demon"), Toni (in "Eruption")
- Don Messick – N/A (credit only)
- Pat Parris - Vreena (in "Playground of Doom")
- Richard Paul – N/A (credit only)
- Vic Perrin – Sailor ("Return of Atlantis"), Sinestro (in "The Revenge of Doom"), Justice League Computer (in "Video Victims")
- Barney Phillips – N/A (credit only)
- Patrick Pinney – Ernie Wilcox (in "Bully for You")
- Tony Pope – Vinnie (in "Bully for You")
- William Ratner – Recruiter (in "The Recruiter")
- James Reynolds – N/A (credit only)
- Andy Rivas – Professor Nazca (in "The Alien Mummy")
- Mike Road – Alien Mummy (in "The Alien Mummy"), Security Guard (in "Palette's Perils")
- Renny Roker – N/A (credit only)
- Paul Ross – Aircraft Carrier Captain (in "The Aircraft Terror")
- Stanley Ralph Ross – Brainiac (in "Superclones"), Gorilla Grodd (in "Two Gleeks are Deadlier Than One")
- Dick Ryal – N/A (credit only)
- Michael Rye – Apache Chief, Green Lantern, Novarian Leader (in "Bigfoot"), Bulgor the Behemoth (in "Bulgor the Behemoth"), Pike (in "Outlaws of Orion"), Romac (in "The Killer Machines"), Dr. Olin (in "The Killer Machines")
- Rick Segall
- Michael Sheehan – Truck Driver (in "The Iron Cyclops")
- Olan Soule – Batman, Repair Man
- Andre Stojka – Scorpio (in "Scorpio"), Sleep (in "Prisoners of Sleep"), Coal Miner (in "Prisoners of Sleep")
- Robert Strom – Judge (in "Superclones")
- Lee Thomas – Captain Hood (in "The Stowaways From Space")
- Matthew Tobin – Jacques (in "Terror on the Titanic")
- Janet Waldo – Hawkgirl
- Janis Ward
- Vernee Watson – N/A (credit only)
- Jimmy Weldon – Solomon Grundy (in "Revenge of Doom")
- Frank Welker – Mister Mxyzptlk, Dr. Wells (in "Elevator to Nowhere"), Moon Creature (in "Man in the Moon"), Ringmaster (in "Circus of Horrors"), Elephant (in "Circus of Horrors")
- Louise Williams – Jayna
- Jeff Winkless – Surgeon (in "A Pint of Life")
- William Woodson – Narrator, Volti Guard (in "Day of the Dinosaurs")
- Lynnanne Zager
- Marian Zajac

== Episodes ==
=== Season 1 (1980) ===
No. overall	No. in season	Title	Original release date
56a	1a	"Big Foot"	September 13, 1980
Apache Chief and few of his fellow braves are captured by alien creatures resembling the legendary Bigfoot. Batman and Robin try to help, but are also captured. After they escape and defeat the creatures, the Super Friends learn that they were merely trying to seek information to repair their spacecraft. Cameos: Superman, Wonder Woman, and Aquaman
56b	1b	"The Ice Demon"	September 13, 1980
While on a skiing vacation, the Wonder Twins literally bump into a pair of reckless teenagers and wind up in an ice cave inhabited by an Ice Demon. Only Superman can save them. Luckily, Clark Kent and Lois Lane are nearby.
56c	1c	"The Make-Up Monster"	September 13, 1980
A disgruntled make-up man on the set of a movie discovers a formula that allows him to make himself up into any powerful monster he chooses. With the formula, he wreaks havoc and wrecks the movie studio and only Batman, Robin, and the Flash dare to challenge him.
57a	2a	"Journey Into Blackness"	September 20, 1980
While monitoring the galaxy from his impenetrable Fortress of Solitude, Superman notices a black hole that is going to suck up the Earth. Superman attempts to stop it, but gets himself pulled into the black hole. Using the Bat-Rocket, Batman and Samurai set out to accomplish what Superman failed to do, but the two heroes end up getting pulled into an asteroid planet in the center of the black hole. Upon finding Superman imprisoned, the heroes are attacked by a Star Energy Creature. The Super Friends must break free and stop the Star Creature from absorbing Earth. Note: This is the first out of ten episodes where Batman began appearing in various episodes without Robin.
57b	2b	"The Cycle Gang"	September 20, 1980
The Highway Angels, a motorcycle gang, start tormenting a senior citizen and his grandson. When Zan, Janya, and Gleek try to help them, they were having a hard time dealing with the cycle gang and the danger at hand. Wonder Woman sees the Wonder Twins and gives them assistance.
57c	2c	"Dive to Disaster"	September 20, 1980
Several miles off the coast of Hawaii, a routine Navy mission becomes a nightmare when a submarine's controls short circuits and the nuclear reactor starts to overload. Black Vulcan and Aquaman try to help, but are attacked by nuclear mutated sea creatures. Black Vulcan actually gets eaten by a mutated whale in which Aquaman must come to his rescue. When the two heroes get free, they make it aboard the submarine, whose communication transmitter went dead. Their only chance is to launch Aquaman out of a torpedo tube to clear the beach, while Black Vulcan uses his electrical powers. Cameos: Superman and Wonder Woman
58a	3a	"Yuna the Terrible"	September 27, 1980
A group of archaeologists accidentally releases Yuna the Terrible and her barbarian warriors. Batman and Robin responds to a distress call but get captured by Yuna's warriors. Wonder Woman and Apache Chief respond to the Batman's distress call. During an encounter with Yuna, Apache Chief gets put into a trance and joins Yuna and her warriors. Wonder Woman tries to save them and must prove her strength against Yuna. Cameos: Superman
58b	3b	"Rock and Roll Space Bandits"	September 27, 1980
A group of Rock and Roll Space Bandits paralyze the Super Friends and invade a major city on Earth using their hypnotic music. The Wonder Twins come to the rescue, but get hypnotized. Wonder Woman helps the rest of the Super Friends get free and they rush off to stop the musical menaces. Batman uses a device to stop the sound waves.
58c	3c	"Elevator to Nowhere"	September 27, 1980
Streaking in the Invisible Jet, Wonder Woman and the Atom answer a distress call on the emergency scanner from a Dr. Wells. Wells' call was actually a trap to get Wonder Woman and the Atom to test out his new time machine. Wonder Woman starts pressing buttons attempting to escape, but actually starts the time machine to send the Atom and herself to the American Revolution in 1776. General George Washington mistakes Wonder Woman for a British spy. The two heroes escape (but the Atom gives a quick message to George Washington to keep fighting in the Revolution), then move further back into the past to a 17th-century galleon, where they are confronted by Blackbeard. After saving the Atom, Wonder Woman and Atom escape in the time machine. The Atom decides to shrink down to microscopic size to rewire the circuits in the time machine to go back to 1980. When they come back, Dr. Wells tries to elude them by using the time machine to escape. The heroes travel millions of years into the prehistoric past to capture him.
59a	4a	"One Small Step for Mars"	October 4, 1980
Green Lantern and Superman must stop the reign of terror caused by Martians who traveled to Earth in a returning space probe. They are finally tricked into returning to Mars. Cameos: Batman, Wonder Woman, and Aquaman.
59b	4b	"Haunted House"	October 4, 1980
A group of teens dare each other to go into the old Brimstone mansion in the cemetery, a place that is said to be haunted. Two of them go in the mansion and get trapped inside. The other two ask the Wonder Twins go inside to look for the other boys, but get captured by old man Holmes, the cemetery's paranoid caretaker. Gleek informs Batman and Robin who come to the rescue and stop Holmes cold in his tracks.
59c	4c	"The Incredible Crude Oil Monster"	October 4, 1980
Not far off the Alaska coastline, millions of gallons of crude oil spill out from a ruptured supertanker. Suddenly, the crude oil comes alive in the form of a giant monster. Aquaman sees the oil monster and helps the supertanker to stop the creature by using a harpoon with a net wrapped around to contain the monster. When that plan did not work, the captain called Hawkman and Hawkgirl for assistance, while Aquaman handles the creature. Hawkman and Hawkgirl arrive, but by the time they got there, the oil monster had already taken off for the coast. Later, the oil monster attacks the Alaskan Pipeline and grows even larger. Hawkman and Hawkgirl try to stop the monster, but they get covered in oil and get captured and eaten by the monster. Aquaman acts fast and saves the winged avengers by going inside the monster and using his telepathy as radar. After Hawkman gets an idea of how to stop the monster, the three heroes go to a small general store to get all of the detergent soap so they can put the plan in motion. They arrive at the nearby harbor to find the monster feeding on the first storage tank. Aquaman leads the monster to the empty storage tank, while Hawkman and Hawkgirl pour the detergent on the monster, turning it back into plain crude oil.
60a	5a	"Voodoo Vampire"	October 11, 1980
Vampiress, the Voodoo Vampire from Africa, goes after the Super Friends and seeks to make them her vampire slaves. It is now up to Wonder Woman and Black Vulcan to go to her underground tomb and stop her.
60b	5b	"Invasion of the Gleeks"	October 11, 1980
A group of Exxorian monkeys arrive on Earth to invade the planet. The monkeys want to defeat the Super Friends by putting Gleek under their control. The Wonder Twins must use their powers to help Gleek and the Super Friends.
60c	5c	"Mxyzptlk Strikes Again"	October 11, 1980
The impish villain Mr. Mxyzptlk uses his magic typewriter to force Superman, Aquaman, and the Green Lantern into destroying each other.
61a	6a	"The Man in the Moon"	October 18, 1980
Superman, Batman, and Apache Chief must save Earth from a giant alien beast that "hatched" out of the moon like an "egg". Absent: Robin
61b	6b	"Circus of Horrors"	October 18, 1980
While at the circus, the Wonder Twins and Gleek witness the revenge of circus animals as they zap the audience in a trance. The animals capture Gleek and zap the Wonder Twins as well, who they send off to lure Superman and Wonder Woman into a trap at the circus. The circus animals eventually turn the Super Friends into Super Animals. Gleek frees the Wonder Twins from the trance, and now it is up to them to save their friends and put an end to this circus once and for all. Cameos: Batman and Robin
61c	6c	"Around the World in 80 Riddles"	October 18, 1980
Superman brings a new engine for the Bat-jet to the Bat-Cave, but when Batman opens it up, he finds the Riddler hiding inside. He hops out and spritzes Superman, Wonder Woman, Batman, and Robin with stupid spray. There is only one antidote and the Riddler has hidden it somewhere. If the Super Friends do not find it before the time limit is up, they will be super-stupid forever. Before he hops away, the Riddler gives the Super Friends their first riddle clue. The Super Friends arrive at the Mayan ruins in Chichen Itza; there Superman spots what he believes is the antidote in the pyramid by using his X-ray vision. The Super Friends enter the pyramid, only to be caught in a Riddler trap. They escape the trap, then find the Riddler's second clue, but by that time they need the assistance of the Bat-Computer because they have become too stupid to figure out the riddles. The computer tells them to go to Mt. Everest and there they defeat the Riddler, who is in a zeppelin, and get the antidote.
62a	7a	"Termites from Venus"	October 25, 1980
Termites come from a meteorite sent from Venus to Earth by a volcanic eruption. They start consuming the world. Superman, Batman and Robin, and Samurai defeat them, finally sending them into space.
62b	7b	"Eruption"	October 25, 1980
The Wonder Twins rescue a part of reckless hang gliders who fell into a volcano. Soon after the volcano starts erupting. Jayna calls Batman and Robin, who help the Wonder Twins rescue the rest of the town and stop the lava flow.
62c	7c	"Return of Atlantis"	October 25, 1980
Hundreds of miles off the East Coast of North America, a routine Trans-Atlantic trip turns into a nightmare when a ship gets caught between some jagged rocks and takes on water. Aquaman was in the area assists by using his telepathy to summon two manta rays to seal the hole as he pushes the ship out of danger. As he attempts to head back to the Hall of Justice, a larger island arises from the sea. Aquaman recognizes it as the Lost Island of Ancient Atlantis (not to be confused with Aquaman's home in modern Atlantis) that has thought to have been destroyed thousands of years ago. Upon checking out the island, Aquaman is captured by female Atlantean Warriors who seek world domination. The U.S. Coast Guards who were on the ship Aquaman saved send a distress call to Wonder Woman and Rima about an island moving towards shore. Meanwhile, the Atlantean Warriors arrive at Washington D.C. and attack the Army. Wonder Woman and Rima arrive and are confronted by Ocina, Queen of Atlantis, and are offered to join the group of Warriors. When the two heroes refuse, they are captured and put in the water dungeon where Aquaman is imprisoned. Wonder Woman uses her telepathic mind line to summon help from her mother Hippolyta and the Amazons of Paradise Island. The Amazons of Paradise Island travel to Washington D.C. to fight an epic battle against these femme fatales.
63a	8a	"The Killer Machines"	November 1, 1980
The IBN computer research facility creates Romac, the most advanced computer the world has ever known. When tested, Romac turns on his IBN creators and tries to destroy the Super Friends by turning the Justice League Computer and the Supermobile against them. Batman, Robin, and Black Vulcan have to shut Romac down before he can do any more damage.
63b	8b	"Garden of Doom"	November 1, 1980
A scientific experiment accidentally turns plants into monsters.
63c	8c	"Revenge of Bizarro"	November 1, 1980
Bizarro takes revenge on Batman, Robin, Wonder Woman, Hawkman, and Hawkgirl by turning them into his "Super Bizarro slaves" and exposing Superman to red kryptonite, causing Superman to grow extra arms and legs. Superman's only chance to stop Bizarro and return to normal is blue kryptonite, which affects only Bizarros adversely.

=== Season 2 (1981) ===
No. overall	No. in season	Title	Original release date
64a	1a	"Outlaws of Orion"	September 26, 1981
When chasing a burglar in Gotham City, Batman and Robin are captured by Pack and Stardust, bounty hunters from Orion. Batman attempts to call for help using the Justice League beeper, but he did not realize the Bounty Hunters know help is coming and are ready to ambush them. Wonder Woman and Green Lantern come to save Batman and Robin but instead gets captured and imprisoned as well. The Bounty Hunters tries to take their captives to The Orion Territorial Prison but on the way the Super Friends make a break and go after the Bounty Hunters.
64b	1b	"Three Wishes"	September 26, 1981
The Wonder Twins find a magic lamp, the evil Space Genie of it gives them three wishes, which lead to trouble. With the last wish however, they never used the lamp.
64c	1c	"Scorpio"	September 26, 1981
Wonder Woman receives a distress call from a scientist who was working on a way to end world hunger by a substance that makes vegetables grow to huge proportions. The scientist also says that an earlier failed experiment on a scorpion make it grow and gave it the power of speech. Scorpio is also stealing the growth formula to use on insects for his bug army, with intent of overthrowing humanity as Earth's dominant species. Scorpio learns of Wonder Woman's presence and orders another attack from his bug army to steal the rest of the growth serum. Wonder Woman and the Flash goes after the bugs to save Robin while Batman and the scientist must create an antidote to return the bugs back to normal.
65a	2a	"Mxyzptlk's Flick"	October 3, 1981
Batman, Robin, and the Wonder Twins are thrown into a movie by Mr. Mxyzptlk.
65b	2b	"Sink Hole"	October 3, 1981
Wonder Woman arrives to help a sheriff from the hills of West Virginia and investigate why a giant cobra is creating sink holes. Shortly after, Wonder Woman and the Sheriff are captured by a giant mechanical cobra. Diamond Jack invents the mechanical Cobra to change coal into diamonds. Superman and The Atom rush to the aid of Wonder Woman and help her defeat Diamond Jack and his mechanical cobra.
65c	2c	"Alien Mummy"	October 3, 1981
While accompanying Professor Naska and his students on a field trip to Ancient Aztec ruins in Mexico, El Dorado is attacked by alien invaders. When El Dorado scares them off, an angered Alien Mummy attacks El Dorado and the others. Meanwhile at the Hall of Justice, Superman and Wonder Woman receive a U.F.O. alert and head out to Mexico. When the two Super Friends arrived, they saw the Alien Mummy having El Dorado and the others have been put under mind control. When Superman and Wonder Woman confront the Alien Mummy, he turns both of them into golden statues. Wonder Woman's attempt to communicate telepathically with El Dorado was a success when he breaks free of the Alien Mummy's mind control and distracts the Alien Mummy with a hologram Beast. Meanwhile he transports himself to find his Super Friends turned to gold. El Dorado brings them back to the Alien Mummy who gets his power source broken by Superman's X-Ray vision which returns everyone to normal. El Dorado leads the Alien Mummy into his spacecraft and Superman sends him off.
66a	3a	"The Evil from Krypton"	October 10, 1981
Zy-Kree, an escapee from the Phantom Zone (who is very similar to General Zod in his appearance and backstory) seeks revenge on Superman by turning the Earth's sun red and thus depowering the man of steel while hiding in the Fortress of Solitude. It is up to Green Lantern and Aquaman to help their friend defeat the evil Kryptonian who has the same powers as Superman. Finally, he is sent back to the Phantom Zone.
66b	3b	"The Creature from the Dump"	October 10, 1981
A junk creature forms after two kids hanging around a dump inadvertently made a mysterious chemical reaction occur. When Batman gets infected by the chemicals, he also turns into a junk creature. The Junior Super Friends try to find a way to get Batman back to normal.
66c	3c	"The Aircraft Terror"	October 10, 1981
A meteor hits an aircraft and turns it into a winged beast. When the Wonder Twins respond to a Trouble Alert, they find out that the aircraft creatures had the ability to turn other aircraft into living beasts. Batman and Robin trailed the beasts from the Batjet and try to stop the attack by taking out the ringleader of the beasts.
67a	4a	"The Lava Men"	October 17, 1981
After saving a killer whale, Aquaman notices the water is on fire and radios Wonder Woman for help who then tells Superman. Meanwhile, Aquaman, with the help of his whale friend, helps move a ship from the path of the flaming water. Superman arrives stops the flames with a concrete road and his super breath. The Super Friends find out that a group of Lava Men are the ones who are causing the trouble. Solderath, King of the Lava Men, wreaks havoc on the surface world because he feels that the Lava Men have been living underground for too long while the humans occupy the surface. While Wonder Woman fights the Lava Men, Superman stops a fire ball over the North Pole and Aquaman stops a giant whirlpool from draining the ocean. When the three Super Friends rejoin each other they defeat the Lava Men and return them back to the center of the Earth.
67b	4b	"Bazarowurld"	October 17, 1981
Superman and Black Vulcan are tricked by Bizarro into going to Bizarro-World. Black Vulcan is tricked into a Maze of Mirrors, while Superman is tricked into a red Kryptonite mine, turning him into a skinny figure while Bizarro is immune to it, but soon uses the rays passing through his blue suit to his advantage, turning them to Blue Kryptonite, which weakens Bizarro, and restores Superman. Black Vulcan smashes through the mirrors, he and Superman leave Bizarro-World.
67c	4c	"The Warlord's Amulet"	October 17, 1981
After receiving a trouble alert from Samurai's homeland, Samurai responds to the call at once and finds an ancient fugitive warlord that escaped his time period using his Amulet. When the warlord tries to steal the village treasures and causes havoc, Samurai calls Batman and Robin to handle the disasters while he sends the warlord back to 13th-century Japan.
68a	5a	"The Iron Cyclops"	October 24, 1981
Superman finds a mysterious purple ray that is lifting objects in downtown Metropolis. Batman uses the Justice League computer from the Hall of Justice and try to control the beam while Black Vulcan and the Atom joins Superman in Metropolis. They find out that the Iron Cyclops who is projecting the ray lives on a planet which has no gravity and he wants to steal the Earth's. Absent: Robin
68b	5b	"Palette's Perils"	October 24, 1981
Wonder Woman and El Dorado respond to a series of art gallery robberies in Metropolis. They confront John Palette, a painter whose invention can turn paintings of his design into real life monsters that can steal for him.
68c	5c	"Colossus"	October 24, 1981
Colossus, a reckless and destructive cosmic barbarian many times larger than the Earth, turns his attention to Earth's solar system. Apache Chief charges into action using a shrink ray to reduce the giant to ordinary Earth mortal size; Colossus then plummets to Earth. Still very strong, Colossus goes on a rampage and tries to destroy the Hall of Justice, prompting Superman and Apache Chief to send him back to space.
69a	6a	"The Stowaways from Space"	October 31, 1981
The Wonder Twins encounter two hostile aliens that were stowaways on an unmanned space station returning to Earth. The Wonder Twins join Superman to put the aliens out of commission for good.
69b	6b	"The Scaraghosta Sea"	October 31, 1981
Two scientists encounter a whirlpool and call the Justice League for help. The whirlpool throws them into an eerie undersea harbor deep beneath the ocean floor. A pirate ghost named Keelhaul Kelly hijacks the scientists' mini-sub with plans to escape from his ghost world to resume his piracy in today's above water world. Aquaman, Batman and Robin arrived to save the innocent scientists from the clutches of those who would do them harm.
69c	6c	"The Witch's Arcade"	October 31, 1981
In an arcade, the Wonder Twins and Gleek encountered a witch who shrinks them. As Zan and Jayna elude danger, they called Wonder Woman for help. Now Wonder Woman and the Wonder Twins must stop the witch before she shrinks all of the customers.

=== Season 3 (1983) ===
This season didn't air during a regularly scheduled Saturday morning time-slot, but did get aired when the series began to get aired in repeats/reruns on other networks. In prior series, The Wonder Twins were only paired up with Superman, Batman and Robin or Wonder Woman. This series found them teaming up with other Justice Leaguers. In "Roller Coaster", they're paired with Atom. In "Two Gleeks", they're paired with Wonder Woman and Green Lantern. In "Unexpected Treasure", they're paired with Hawkman and Hawkgirl. In "Space Racers", they're paired with Wonder Woman & Flash. In "Pint of Life", they're paired with Aquaman. In "Invasion of The Space Dolls" and "Bully for You", they're paired with Batman and Robin. In "One Small Step for Superman", they're paired with Superman and Batman. This is the final season that Olan Soule voices Batman and Shannon Farnon voices Wonder Woman.

No. overall	No. in season	Title	Original release date
70a	1a	"Mxyzptlk's Revenge"	September 10, 1983 (AU)
A doorway appears inside the Hall of Justice. Superman and Batman wonder where it originated from and where it leads. Then the voice of Mxyzptlk is heard and Superman realizes who's responsible. The door opens up, sucking everything inside, including Batman and Superman. The doorway is a warp between Earth and the Fifth Dimension. Once in the mixed up world of Mr. Mxyzptlk, the two heroes are put through a series of comical and offbeat challenges once the imp removes Superman's cape and Batman's utility belt. Superman is "sentenced" to life in a vegetable garden where green beans are the equivalent to kryptonite. Batman is "sentenced" to life upside down. Superman eventually finds a way to get himself and Batman out of the Fifth Dimension and back to Earth. Absent: Robin
70b	1b	"Roller Coaster"	September 10, 1983 (AU)
Three kids ride a condemned roller coaster that gradually falls apart. The Wonder Twins and Gleek, exiting a movie theater, respond to the crisis. After Zan accidentally breaks a rusted power control and realizing that they need additional help in the rescue attempt they send Gleek to the Hall of Justice and find Atom. Atom soon arrives and shrinks himself even more smaller so he can enter the power box and manually shut down the roller coaster. Note: As the Wonder Twins and Gleek made their way outside the theater, they passed by a movie poster promoting Superman.
70c	1c	"Once Upon a Poltergeist"	September 10, 1983 (AU)
At the Wayne Building in Gotham City, a confused spirit of a Mohawk Indian terrorizes the area due to his belief that the building sits on top of an ancient burial site. Batman, Robin, and Apache Chief battle the spirit but its power is greater. Apache Chief eventually finds the true burial ground and instantly the Indian spirit apologizes for his destruction and peacefully fades away.
71a	2a	"Warpland"	September 17, 1983 (AU)
Superman and Batman are pulled into a space warp where they come across a strange planet inhabited by aliens known as Zoons. The leader of the group, Super Frog, plans on keeping who he sees as invaders as prisoners. He then turns Superman into an eagle and Batman into a real bat. The aliens' headquarters is referred to as the Hall of Zoon. Fortunately Batman and Superman are able to warp into their own galaxy and the effects wear off. Batman remarks that Superman would have made a great eagle. Absent: Robin
71b	2b	"Two Gleeks Are Deadlier Than One"	September 17, 1983 (AU)
Wonder Woman and Green Lantern think the Legion of Doom will strike since the entire Justice League is going to meet in the Hall of Justice the next day. Jayna and Zan are put in charge of security during the night. Giganta sets a trap and captures Gleek with bananas and takes him to Gorillia Grodd miles away on the outskirts of Metropolis. Because so many Justice League members were going to meet in one place, they tried to take precautions but a mechanical duplicate of Gleek arrives at the Hall of Justice to use his killer laser eyes on the Justice League and help Grodd and Giganta take over the Hall of Justice. The Super Friends then reveal that they used androids, knowing such a meeting would probably cause an attack by villains.
71c	2c	"Bulgor the Behemoth"	September 17, 1983 (AU)
A writer turns into the creature he created after a lightning bolt electrocutes an electrical tower nearby. Apache Chief and Superman are on hand to stop the behemoth from continuing his destructive ways.
72a	3a	"The Krypton Syndrome"	September 24, 1983 (AU)
Superman travels through a time warp and is taken back to the hours leading up to Krypton's explosion. He saves the planet by stopping the solar flares using the Super-Mobile core and then returns to the present to find Earth a very different place. Robin confronts him and has no idea who Superman is and then remarks that the Justice League was defeated by the Legion of Doom, he is the only one alive. He soon realizes that by saving Krypton that it erased his time on Earth and that nobody had ever heard of Superman before. He goes back into the time warp and makes sure Krypton explodes to ensure that Superman can exist. Note: This marks the first episode that Robin appears without Batman.
72b	3b	"Invasion of the Space Dolls"	September 24, 1983 (AU)
Space dolls try to take over the world but run out of batteries.
72c	3c	"Terror on the Titanic"	September 24, 1983 (AU)
Two divers find the Titanic which has become inhabited by a mutated form of algae. Aquaman and Black Vulcan respond to the danger. After a lightning blast from Black Vulcan, the Titanic comes to life and begins to destroy everything in its path. Ultimately, the ship sinks back into the ocean after the two heroes slam it into an iceberg.
73a	4a	"Revenge of Doom"	October 1, 1983 (AU)
Batman and Robin foil some building constructors' plans to revive a destroyed Hall of Doom and turn it into a museum. When Batman figures something is wrong, the building constructors reveal themselves to be Lex Luthor, Solomon Grundy, Sinestro and the rest of the Legion of Doom. Batman and Robin are captured immediately. The Legion restores the Hall of Doom and they pick up where they left off, plotting crimes and world domination. When the Legion of Doom attacks Metropolis, Superman and Wonder Woman attempt to stop them only to get crystallized by Lex Luthor's Crystallization Ray. With the Super Friends defeated, the Legion of Doom take over the Hall of Justice to make their demands. Meanwhile, Superman and Wonder Woman are able to move again, thanks to Superman's X-Ray vision, and are off to stop the Legion of Doom. Batman and Robin must find a way to reverse the polarity of Luthor's Crystallization Ray to transform Superman and Wonder Woman back to normal so the Legion of Doom's raid on Fort Knox can be put to an end.
73b	4b	"A Pint of Life"	October 1, 1983 (AU)
The Wonder Twins and Aquaman search the Amazon River for Doctor Marks who's on an expedition. The doctor's son needs a blood transfusion and there's only a moment of hours left for the Super Friends to locate the doctor.
73c	4c	"Day of the Dinosaurs"	October 1, 1983 (AU)
The Hall of Justice, with Wonder Woman and Samurai inside, gets swallowed up into the Earth. After tumbling through layers of rock, the Hall of Justices comes to a stop at a strange forgotten world beneath our own. When Wonder Woman and Samurai explore the strange subterranean world, they are attacked by prehistoric creatures called Slarums. Technos saves the two Super Friends and offers to show them the world of the Volti. During the tour Technos gets mad because the two Super Friends asked him why the Volti have not helped the Slarums and as a result, Technos imprisons them. Wonder Woman and Samurai escaped and headed over to the Hall of Justice to contact the other Super Friends only to be met by Slarums. Wonder Woman, Samurai, and the Slarums decide to pay the Volti a visit to unite the two races and lift the Hall of Justice back to the surface.
74a	5a	"Return of the Phantoms"	October 8, 1983 (AU)
The three Phantom Zone villains: Logar, Hol, and Romlok are freed by an alien who doesn't realize they are criminals. In this episode they force the alien to travel back in time with them in an attempt to alter Superboy's life—hoping that he will never grow up to become Superman. Meanwhile, in the future, Superman and Green Lantern learn of the plot from the alien and travel back in time to save Superman's own past and capture the Phantom Zone villains.
74b	5b	"Bully for You"	October 8, 1983 (AU)
Teen angst and bullying are spotlighted at the start of this episode. In the meantime, after a daring mission on a skyscraper, Batman loses his utility belt. The boy who was being bullied finds the belt and seeks revenge, but the boy doesn't know what all power that the belt contains and he accidentally switches on a high frequency signal that leads to Earth shaking effects and building destruction.
74c	5c	"Superclones"	October 8, 1983 (AU)
After obtaining living cells from Aquaman and El Dorado's skin, Brainiac creates clones of the two heroes. Brainiac programs the Aquaman and El Dorado clones to their counterparts bring them back to Brainiac's laboratory. After attempting to rob a ship, the clones are apprehended. The next day in court the clones say the Super Friends have turned against the people. The real El Dorado and Aquaman trick Brainiac into freeing them and they are all transported to the Metropolis courthouse. There, they clear up the situation and incarcerate Brainiac. Cameos: Superman, Batman, Robin, Wonder Woman, Wonder Twins, Green Lantern, Flash, Hawkman, Atom, Black Vulcan, and the Atom Note 1: Superman has a small speaking role despite his cameo. Note 2: Stanley Ralph Ross takes over for the late Ted Cassidy as the voice of Brainiac, and in a rare instance of show created characters returning for a second appearance, the Kryptonian villains from "Terror from the Phantom Zone" return, although their appearance was drastically altered from their previous appearance.
75a	6a	"Prisoners of Sleep"	October 15, 1983 (AU)
While investigating a strange electrified spiked metal pod, Superman and Batman unwittingly unleashed the cloud-like prisoner inside named Sleep, and are then trapped in a dream world. Superman dreams that everything he touches turns to kryptonite. Batman's nightmare involves a building's ledge turning to dust as he falls into the awaiting jaws of the vicious monster. Wonder Woman tries to save them by wrapping her golden lasso around her waist and entering the dream world. She instructs a miner to wake her in five minutes by tugging on the lasso and it works. Superman then breathes the creature into his lungs and blows him back into the pod. Absent: Robin
75b	6b	"An Unexpected Treasure"	October 15, 1983 (AU)
Two teenagers discover an ancient warship buried underneath the desert sands and they take off in it. The Wonder Twins and Gleek attempt to rescue the teens and they ultimately seek the help of Hawkman and Hawkgirl. The teens, the Wonder Twins, and Gleek are trapped inside the ship as it makes its way to its own galaxy. Zan eventually discovers how to open up the ship's hatch and everyone is safe from certain danger.
75c	6c	"The Malusian Blob"	October 15, 1983 (AU)
Space shuttle astronauts unwittingly load an alien chemical blob into their cargo bay (assuming it to be space junk). The blob starts eating metal and the astronauts call for help. Batman, Robin, and Black Vulcan arrived and rescued the astronauts. Assuming the blob burned up in the atmosphere, they return to Earth, but then the blob reappears and after some failed attempts, they figure out that the substance may have an unstable reaction to sugar.
76a	7a	"Attack of the Cats"	October 22, 1983 (AU)
Batman, Robin, and El Dorado investigate a series of crimes which lead them to the conclusion that the culprits are not human.
76b	7b	"One Small Step for Superman"	October 22, 1983 (AU)
A boy loses his pet dog during an accident in the wilderness. After being taken to the hospital, he's given a clean bill of health, but yet he insists he's paralyzed. It's then up to Batman and the Wonder Twins to convince the boy that his paralysis isn't real and that it is more than likely an emotional response to the traumatic incident and the loss of his pet dog. During a bird's eye view of the city, courtesy of Superman, a gigantic metallic monster starts to destroy the city. It ultimately fires out kryptonite, which leaves Superman weakened. Superman pleads for the boy, who still believes he can't walk, to get rid of the kryptonite. The boy struggles to make himself walk again in an attempt to save Superman. There's an emotional twist at the end of the story, though. Absent: Robin
76c	7c	"Video Victims"	October 22, 1983 (AU)
Bizarro creates trouble by zapping several of the Super Friends into an arcade game reminiscent of Pac-Man and Bizarro is in control of the hungry muncher. Midway through the game, the giant creature turns green—a kryptonite creature that swallows a severely weakened Superman. Ultimately, Bizarro becomes a victim of his own plan.
77a	8a	"Playground of Doom"	October 29, 1983 (AU)
Giant children arrive on Earth and create destruction all over the city. Superman, Batman and Robin have their hands full while trying to prevent them from causing trouble. A call to the children's home planet and a visit from some influential individuals put a stop to the children's pranks. Note: This is the final episode that Olan Soule voices Batman.
77b	8b	"Space Racers"	October 29, 1983 (AU)
The Wonder Twins and Gleek are on weekend patrol duty when the Justice League patrol craft is invaded by space racing punks. After the Wonder Twins decide to teach them to respect the law, the space racing punks decide to retreat by dematerializing. They take Jayna along with them and hold her hostage. At the Hall of Justice, Wonder Woman and The Flash notice there are three spacecraft violating lightspeed in the Saturn sector and decide to check it out. When they arrive they see the space punks have hit a space mining ship. Wonder Woman and The Flash save the two space miners and The Wonder Twins saves the out of control space ship.
77c	8c	"The Recruiter"	October 29, 1983 (AU)
Superman and Wonder Woman are abducted by a race of alien beings and are forced to play intergalactic football which is referred to as space ball in this episode. By the end of the episode, the heroes teach the aliens that the key to success is to work together.

== Reruns, cancellation, and lost episodes ==
For the 1982–1983 season, ABC continued to run a half-hour of reruns called The Best of the Super Friends, but none of the seven minute shorts were rebroadcast. By 1983, Hanna-Barbera had a syndication package of the earlier Super Friends episodes, distributed by LBS Communications and run from 1983–1986. These episodes were picked up by various stations across the US and were typically broadcast on weekday afternoons. Not wishing to compete with the syndicated programming, ABC dropped the series from the 1983–1984 Saturday morning line-up, and Super Friends was canceled for the second time, but during this period of time, Hanna-Barbera continued to produce new episodes of Super Friends.

In total, 8 episodes (24 cartoons) of the "lost episodes" were made, but not aired in the US that season. The series did appear in Australia uninterrupted. One of these episodes was aired when Super Friends returned to Saturday morning ABC television the following year. The remainder of the episodes finally aired in syndication in 1995 as part of the Superman/Batman Adventures show on USA Network. The series also aired on Cartoon Network and Boomerang.

== Home media ==
Warner Home Video (via Hanna-Barbera Cartoons, DC Comics and Warner Bros. Family Entertainment) released the 1983 lost episodes of this series in August 2009. They were released as a DVD set, titled Super Friends: The Lost Episodes. Warner Home Video released season one episodes on DVD as "Super Friends - Season 5: A Dangerous Fate", on July 23, 2013, and later "Super Friends: Legacy of Super Powers - Season 6" on DVD on October 8 the same year. With the release of Season 6, the entire Super Friends series is available on DVD.

The 1980 series has since been available on Blu-ray on September 10, 2024 as part of the Super Friends! - The Complete Collection by Warner Bros. Home Entertainment.
