= Batman and Superman =

Batman and Superman are superheroes appearing in American comic books published by DC Comics.

Batman and Superman may also refer to:

- World's Finest Comics, an American comic book ongoing series
- The Batman/Superman Hour, an American animated television series
- The Superman/Batman Adventures, an American animated television series
- The New Batman/Superman Adventures, an American animated television series
- The Batman/Superman Movie: World's Finest, a 1997 American animated film
- Superman & Batman: Generations, an American comic book limited series
- Superman and Batman: World's Funnest, an American one-shot comic book
- Batman/Superman/Wonder Woman: Trinity, an American comic book limited series
- Superman/Batman, an American comic book ongoing series
- Superman and Batman versus Aliens and Predator, an American comic book limited series
- Superman/Batman: Public Enemies, a 2009 American animated film
- Superman/Batman: Apocalypse, a 2010 American animated film
- Batman v Superman: Dawn of Justice, a 2016 American film
  - Batman v Superman: Dawn of Justice (soundtrack), the soundtrack album for the 2016 film
- Batman and Superman: Battle of the Super Sons, a 2022 American animated film
