= Shannon Farnon =

Canadian actress

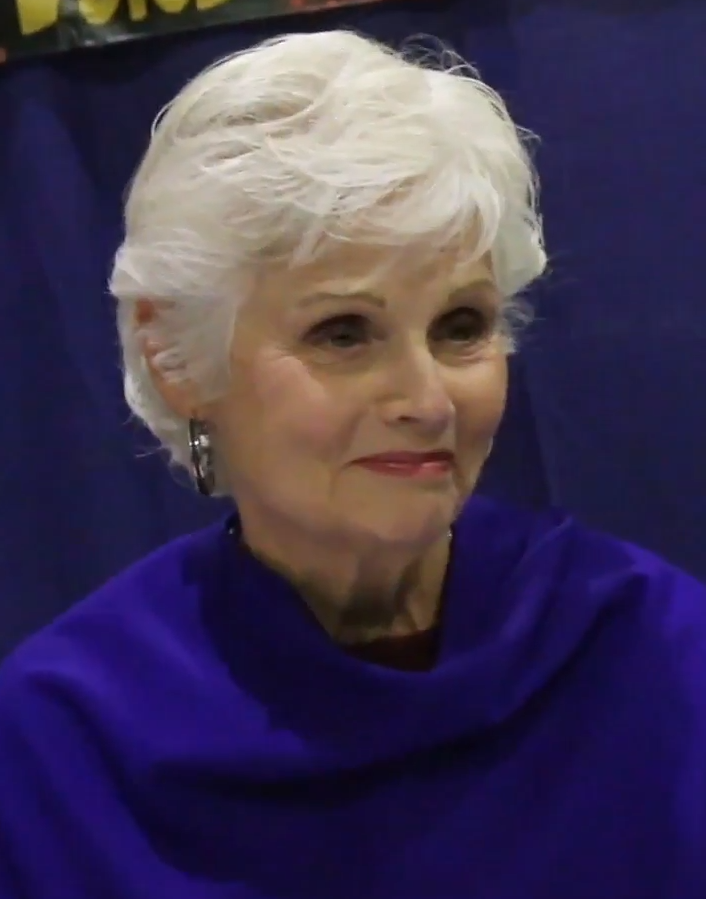
- Farnon at the Rhode Island Comic Con, 2018
- Born: Sharon Maureen Farnon; November 28, 1941 (age 84); Toronto, Ontario, Canada
- Education: San Fernando High School; Los Angeles Valley College
- Occupation: Actress
- Years active: 1965–present
- Spouse: William Wells (m. 1966–1975)
- Children: 2 (1 deceased)
- Parents: Brian Farnon (father); Rita Oehmen (mother)
- Relatives: Charmian Carr (sister); Darleen Carr (sister)

Shannon Farnon (born Sharon Maureen Farnon; November 28, 1941) is a Canadian-born American actress. She is best known as being the first actress to voice Wonder Woman in a Hanna-Barbera production, having voiced her in Super Friends from 1973 to 1983.

== Early life ==
Born in Toronto, and raised, respectively, in Detroit, Chicago, and San Fernando, California, Farnon is the daughter of musician and conductor Brian Farnon and singer/actress Rita Oehmen, and the sister of actresses Charmian Carr and Darleen Carr.

After graduating from San Fernando High School in 1959, Farnon majored in theatre arts at Los Angeles Valley College, co-starring in at least one production—James Costigan's Cradle Song—with her sister and fellow San Fernando High alumnus, then still known as Charmian Farnon. Named homecoming queen in 1960, Farnon made the dean's list the following year. In between, she featured prominently—as "MISS WEEKEND"—in the summer 1961 promotional campaign by the San Fernando Valley Times on behalf of its new "Friday" section.

== Career ==
Farnon starred in film, television, commercials and cartoons. However, her first role was in 1965 in an uncredited role on Burke's Law. She went on to appear in multiple other television series, but was most active in commercials. In 1967, she appeared in an episode of I Dream of Jeannie as Major Nelson's date, selected by Jeannie with the use of a "computer machine" at a dating club, and in March, 1970, she was in an episode of Dragnet ("Night School"), where she played a fellow student attending a college course with Joe Friday (played by the show's, creator, producer and star, Jack Webb).

While playing a mother in a live-action commercial in 1973 for Flintstones Chewable Vitamins, she was approached by voice director Wally Burr to audition for what was to be her most long-running famous role, Wonder Woman on Super Friends.

From 1973 to 1983, Farnon voiced the Amazon superheroine on Super Friends, Challenge of the Superfriends, The All-New Super Friends Hour, The World's Greatest Super Friends and the revival of Super Friends. Farnon did voice several incidental characters, such as Lois Lane and Hawkgirl on some of the series and also played Kim Butler in Valley of the Dinosaurs in 1974, but mainly she did the voice of Wonder Woman. She made a guest appearance in the television show Emergency! (1977 S6E21 “Limelight”) as Mrs. Robinson.

However, in 1984, her prominent character was recast in Super Friends: The Legendary Super Powers Show, when the role was given to Constance Cawlfield and later to B.J. Ward. This case has often been given as an example of injustice in the television and animation industry. Mary McDonald-Lewis voiced Wonder Woman in an episode of Superman.

She voiced Wonder Woman on many Cartoon Network promos and went on to appear in several films and television series, but since 2005, her acting appearances have been infrequent. She has voiced various commercials, including Betty Crocker, Nivea, Kodak, National World War II Memorial, Oil of Olay, Scotchgard and Cartoon Network spoofs of The Super Friends.

== Personal life ==
She was married to William Wells from 1966 to 1975 (married twice after that) and had twins, Jeremy and Julie (born 1971). Jeremy died from a skiing accident at the age 24.

Preceded by Jane Webb (1972)	Actress to voice Wonder Woman; 1973-1983	Succeeded by Connie Cawlfield (1984-1985)
