= Wendy, Marvin and Wonder Dog =

DC Comics characters

Wendy and Marvin
- Marvin, Wonder Dog, and Wendy on the cover of Teen Titans vol. 3 #62

Publication information
- Publisher: DC Comics
- First appearance: Super Friends "The Power Pirate"
- First comic appearance: Limited Collectors' Edition #C-41 (January 1976)
- Created by: E. Nelson Bridwell; Alex Toth

In-story information
- Full name: Wendy Harris; Marvin White
- Supporting character of: Super Friends; Teen Titans; Oracle; Batgirl; Space Canine Patrol Agents (Wonder Dog)
- Notable aliases: Marvin and Wendy Kuttler

Wendy Harris, Marvin White and Wonder Dog are fictional characters from the 1973 American animated TV series Super Friends, based on the famous superheroes published by DC Comics. The series featured a lineup of DC's most popular characters, including Superman, Batman and Wonder Woman, but Hanna-Barbera, the show's producers, wanted to include young sidekick characters that the children in the audience could identify with. This led to the creation of Wendy, Marvin and their hero pet Wonder Dog, who appeared alongside their more famous friends. Because of the success of the Super Friends cartoon, a Super Friends comic book was also created, in which the trio made their first comics appearance.

Wendy, Marvin and Wonder Dog did not have superpowers, so they often did not add much to the story progression, and they were dropped after the show's first season. Wendy and Marvin were replaced in the 1977 series The All-New Super Friends Hour with the Wonder Twins—extraterrestrial twins with the power to transform into animals and water. Wonder Dog's comedy relief role was filled by the Wonder Twins' pet monkey, Gleek.

Wendy's voice was played by Sherry Alberoni, and Marvin and Wonder Dog were voiced by Frank Welker.

The duo were reintroduced in the Teen Titans comic book as the caretakers of Titans Tower, as twins Wendy and Marvin Harris. Wendy eventually became the protégée of Barbara Gordon, while the latter was operating as Oracle, and adopted the codename Proxy. Stories published in this era also revealed that the twins were the children of the supervillain Calculator.

== Fictional character biography ==
=== Super Friends ===
Wendy Harris and Marvin White are two sidekicks who were created in an era in which many series featured main characters with sidekicks who were supposed to serve viewer identification. They are not given backstories in the series, but were later given origin stories following their inclusion in mainstream comics. Wendy is the niece of Harvey Harris, a detective who once trained Batman when he was still a teenager. It was postulated in an editorial column that she may have been the Earth-One version of Wendi Harris Tyler, wife of the first Hourman. Marvin (who was given the last name of White in the comics) was the son of Diana Prince, the nurse whose name Wonder Woman took when she came to Man's World, and her husband Dan White. Thus, Marvin had a sort of familial connection to the Super Friends. The Super Friends were designed to help teach young crimefighters how to be superheroes. While Wendy never wore any special costume, Marvin was always dressed with a cape and a big letter "M" on his chest.

DC's superhero comics were aimed at an older audience than Super Friends, and Hanna-Barbera was careful to present a bland, inoffensive version of the comics' sometimes violent approach. In the book Saturday Morning Fever, writers Timothy and Kevin Burke cite the inclusion of Wendy, Marvin and Wonder Dog as examples of the Hanna-Barbera aesthetic's intrusion into the superhero narrative:

Wendy and Marvin were the ultimate degenerate form of the kid sidekick, about as useful to the Superfriends as a burst appendix. They existed primarily to be rescued and to help illustrate the moral message of the week... Wonder Dog was a Fred Silverman-inspired dog sidekick, part of a shameful lineage which would eventually result in a later incarnation of Spider-Man being burdened with a little white yap-yap dog. Silverman and other kidvid producers had an idée fixe that the presence of a dog inevitably made a cartoon attractive to kids.

E. Nelson Bridwell, the writer on Super Friends, shed some light on the characters' names in Super Friends #1 (Nov. 1976):

Wendy Harris, I decided, was the young lady's full name. She is a niece, not of the Batman, but of a detective named Harvey Harris. This man gave young Bruce Wayne his first crack at real detecting when Bruce was in his teens. Years later, when Harris dies, he left a sealed letter to be delivered to Bruce, revealing that he had indeed known who he was — for Harris was certainly one of the all-time greats in the field.

Marvin, I decided, is Marvin White — no relation to Perry White. His father is Daniel White, inventor, and his mother is the former Diana Prince.

Neither Marvin nor Wendy had any special abilities. However, once on the cartoon, Marvin was shown "practicing" flying, though not very well. In fact, in the cartoon, although very nice and very bright, Marvin was shown to be somewhat bumbling, often needing to learn the day's moral, such as looking up "photosynthesis" for himself rather than having Robin tell him. In the comics, however, Marvin and Wendy's cleverness and resourcefulness made them invaluable to the other Super Friends. The one notable resource Marvin provided to the Super Friends was his pet dog, Wonder Dog (or just "Wonder" for short), who was preternaturally intelligent, though bumbling as well.

Wendy and Marvin meeting the Wonder Twins in the Super Friends comic book

After two seasons of the Super Friends cartoon, it was cancelled, though re-runs were shown through 1976. When the show returned as The All-New Super Friends Hour in 1977, Wendy and Marvin had been replaced by two other teenagers, Zan and Jayna, the Wonder Twins, along with their pet, the alien monkey Gleek. Marvin and Wendy did not appear on TV again for another 35 years, and they were also replaced by the Wonder Twins in the Super Friends comic after "graduating" from the Super Friends as full-fledged superheroes.

=== Super Friends comic book ===
Wendy, Marvin and Wonder Dog were first introduced in DC Comics with the January 1976 tabloid comic Limited Collectors' Edition presents: Super Friends #C-41, in which the newcomers are welcomed to the Hall of Justice to meet the entire Justice League of America, including characters who did not appear on the show. Their story was mostly a frame to bookend reprints of older Justice League comics, but each character got their own spotlight. Superman tells Wonder Dog about Krypto, the Dog of Steel, to reassure him (and the readers) that there's a precedent for canine superheroes adventuring with the Justice League.

Wendy, Marvin and Wonder Dog then appeared in the first nine issues of the Super Friends comic book series (November 1976 to December 1977). In issue #7 (Oct 1977), their on-screen replacements, the Wonder Twins, were introduced in a story called "The Warning of the Wonder Twins!". The cover showed the new characters literally pushing the old trio to the side, shouting, "Your time is past, kids -- this is a job for the new Super-Friends!" The three-part adventure ended in issue #9, with Wendy, Marvin and Wonder Dog retiring from the team to go to college, as the Wonder Twins are accepted as new members of the team.

According to the comic book, Marvin went on to study at Ivy University, the fictional university where fellow superhero the Atom worked as a professor. Wendy moved to Paradise Island to attend an Amazon university and continue her training. Wendy and Marvin appeared again in a later issue of the Super Friends comic to aid the Wonder Twins, posing as Zan's and Jayna's human disguises, "John" and "Joanna", to fool a criminal who had deduced the Wonder Twins' secret identities and tried to use them to learn Batman's.

In Wonder Woman vol. 2 #186 (December 2002), an unnamed character identical to Wendy appears on Paradise Island as a tutor to Lyta (daughter of Circe).

=== DC Universe ===
In 2006, a new version of the Wendy and Marvin characters debuted in the DC Universe. The pair work as "caretakers" of Titans Tower one year after the events of the Infinite Crisis crossover. The pair (now fraternal twins, surname Harris) seem to be technical geniuses; Wendy mentions in their initial appearance that she and Marvin graduated from MIT on their sixteenth birthday, and in Teen Titans #40, Ravager refers to them as "tenth-level geniuses" (comparable to Brainiac and Brainiac 5, who possess twelfth-level intellects). This Marvin continues the tradition of his previous incarnations by wearing a shirt with a stylized "M" on the front but without the attached cape of his animated counterpart. It is revealed that Cyborg was damaged and inactive since his return from space, but Wendy and Marvin repaired him and gave him new capabilities.

Wendy and Marvin meet a stray dog that Miss Martian names Wonder Dog. Wonder Dog is revealed to be a demonic monster in the service of the villain King Lycus, who appears at the end of the issue after the beast has killed Marvin and mauled Wendy. While comatose, Wendy is visited in this state by her father Noah Kuttler, who swears revenge on the Titans for allowing this to happen to his children.

In Oracle: The Cure #3, Wendy recovers from her coma, but is left paraplegic, with Oracle and Leslie Thompkins helping her adjust. After taking Wendy under her wing, Barbara eventually reveals her alter-ego to her. Wendy's first mission as an associate of the Oracle is to help Stephanie Brown, the new Batgirl, defeat her father the Cluemaster and save Barbara from him. Afterward, she takes on the codename of Proxy, acting as a junior version of Oracle.

== Other versions ==
An alternate universe variant of Marvin White appears in Kingdom Come.

== In other media ==
=== Television ===
- Wonder Dog makes a cameo appearance in the Justice League Unlimited episode "Ultimatum" as an experiment of Project Cadmus'.
- Wendy and Marvin appear in Young Justice, voiced by Masasa Moyo and Nolan North respectively. These versions are students at Happy Harbor High and classmates of Miss Martian, Superboy, Karen Beecher, and Mal Duncan, with Wendy additionally being a cheerleader and Marvin a slacker. Following their introduction in season one, Wendy and Marvin make minor appearances throughout the series, culminating in them entering a relationship and attending Ivy University together.
- Wendy and Marvin appear in the unaired pilot episode of Powerless, portrayed by Kate Micucci and Josh Fadem, respectively. They were ultimately dropped in the final series.
- Wendy, Marvin, and Wonder Dog make cameo appearances in Scooby-Doo, Where Are You Now!.

=== Film ===
- Wendy, Marvin, and Wonder Dog make cameo appearances in JLA Adventures: Trapped in Time.
- Wonder Dog makes a cameo appearance in The Lego Batman Movie as the DJ for the 57th annual Justice League anniversary party.

=== Video games ===
Wonder Dog appears in DC Universe Online.

=== Miscellaneous ===
Wendy, Marvin, and Wonder Dog appear in the Adult Swim web series The New Adventures of the Wonder Twins episode "Be Kind, Rewind". These versions are part of a rock band. Additionally, following the end of Super Friends, Marvin put on weight and grew a beard.
