= This Is Your FBI =

American radio crime drama (1945–1953)

This Is Your FBI is a radio crime drama broadcast in the United States on ABC from April 6, 1945, to January 30, 1953, for a total of 409 shows. FBI chief J. Edgar Hoover gave it his endorsement, calling it "the finest dramatic program on the air". Dramatizations of FBI cases were narrated by Frank Lovejoy, Dean Carleton and William Woodson. Lawrence MacArthur wrote the episodes. This Is Your FBI was sponsored during its entire run by the Equitable Life Assurance Society of the United States.

== Premise ==
Promoting the program's debut, a newspaper announcement noted that the United States was then at war and said, "This Is Your FBI will show graphically exactly how enemies of the United States have, and are, operating, and how FBI agents and American citizens are cooperating to circumvent their activities." It added that crime was not glamorous but "a dirty stab at every citizen and his country".

== Personnel ==
Jerry Devine produced the series. Van Cleave was the initial musical director, leading an 18-man orchestra. While at times credited as the musical director, on some episodes he was also credited for original music. When Fred Steiner took over (named "Frederick Steiner"), same thing happened; some episodes credited as a musical director, others with original music. For a few short episodes betwixt the composers, Leith Stevens was credited.

== Critical response ==
Jay Gould, writing in The New York Times, commented, ". . . characterizations are credible and often embellished with subtle twists that heighten the dramatic effect." He complimented the show's depiction of the importance of small details in apprehending a suspect. He also said that the program's "rather effusive praise for Mr. Hoover and the FBI" was a bit overdone.
