= Jerry Dexter =

American actor

- Dexter in the 60s
- Born: Jerry Morris Chrisman; April 18, 1935; San Francisco, California, U.S.
- Died: June 21, 2013 (aged 78); Sonoma, California, U.S.
- Occupation: Actor
- Years active: 1958–1990
- Children: 2

Jerry Dexter (April 18, 1935 – June 21, 2013) was an American actor and radio presenter best known for playing teenage boys and young men in animated television series for Hanna-Barbera Productions from the late 1960s to the 1980s.

== Early life, family and education ==
Dexter was born Jerry Morris Chrisman in San Francisco, California.

== Career ==
He began his radio career at KENO in Las Vegas, Nevada, in 1958. After a stop at KVI in Seattle, Washington, Dexter relocated to Los Angeles, California, and KMPC in late 1959. He took his show, The Dexter Affair, in October 1962 to KLAC radio in Los Angeles.

In 1964, Dexter had a semi-regular role, playing Corporal Johnson in Gomer Pyle, U.S.M.C. He moved into a full-time television job in June 1968 with the launch of Good Day L.A. on KABC-TV.

Dexter's first cartoon voice work was in 1967 as Chuck in Shazzan. Among his roles were Gary Gulliver in The Adventures of Gulliver, Alan in Josie and the Pussycats, Ted in Goober and the Ghost Chasers, Hal in Sealab 2020, Biff in Fangface, Drak Jr. in Drak Pack, Superboy in an episode of Super Friends, and Sunfire in Spider-Man and His Amazing Friends. He also voiced characters for Filmation Studios during the late 1960s, most notably as the voice of Aqualad in the series Aquaman. He later guest-starred on Challenge of the GoBots, the 1980s revival of The Jetsons, as well as Wildfire, Snorks, DuckTales and Fantastic Max.

== Personal life ==
Dexter resided in San Francisco, Las Vegas, Seattle, and Los Angeles.

Dexter died on June 21, 2013, following complications from a fall.

== Filmography ==
=== Animation ===
Year	Title	Role	Notes
1967–1969	Shazzan	Chuck	
1967–1968	The Superman/Aquaman Hour of Adventure	Aqualad	
1967	Space Ghost	Chuck	Episode: "The Final Encounter"
1968–1969	The Adventures of Gulliver	Gary Gulliver	
1970–1972	Josie and the Pussycats	Alan Mayberry	
1971–1972	The Funky Phantom	Elmo	
1972	Sealab 2020	Hal	
1972–1974	Josie and the Pussycats in Outer Space	Alan Mayberry	
1973–1975	Goober and the Ghost Chasers	Ted	
1973	The New Scooby-Doo Movies	Alan Mayberry	Episode: "The Haunted Showboat"
1977–1978	Fred Flintstone and Friends	Ted	
1978–1979	Fangface	Biff	
1980–1982	Drak Pack	Drak Jr.	
1981	Spider-Man and His Amazing Friends	Sunfire	Episode: "Sunfire"
1983	Super Friends	Superboy	Episode: "Return of the Phantoms"
1987	DuckTales	WASA Controller	Episode: "The Right Duck"

=== Live-action ===
Year	Title	Role	Notes
1961	Checkmate	Ticket Man	Episode: "To the Best of My Recollection"
1962	87th Precinct	Pat	Episode: "Man in a Jam"
1963	McHale's Navy	Ensign	Episode: "The Captain Steals a Crook"
1963	Alcoa Premiere	Therapist	Episode: "The Broken Year"
1964	Hazel	Cab Driver	Episode: "Welcome Back, Kevin"
1964	Gomer Pyle, U.S.M.C.	Corporal Johnson	
1967	Dragnet	Himself	Episode: "The Subscription Racket"
1969	Downhill Racer	Ron Engel	
1974	Apple's Way	Harold	Episode: "The Applicant"
1975	ABC Afterschool Special	Pete Degley	Episode: "The Skating Rink"
