= Bill Woodson =

American actor (1917–2017)

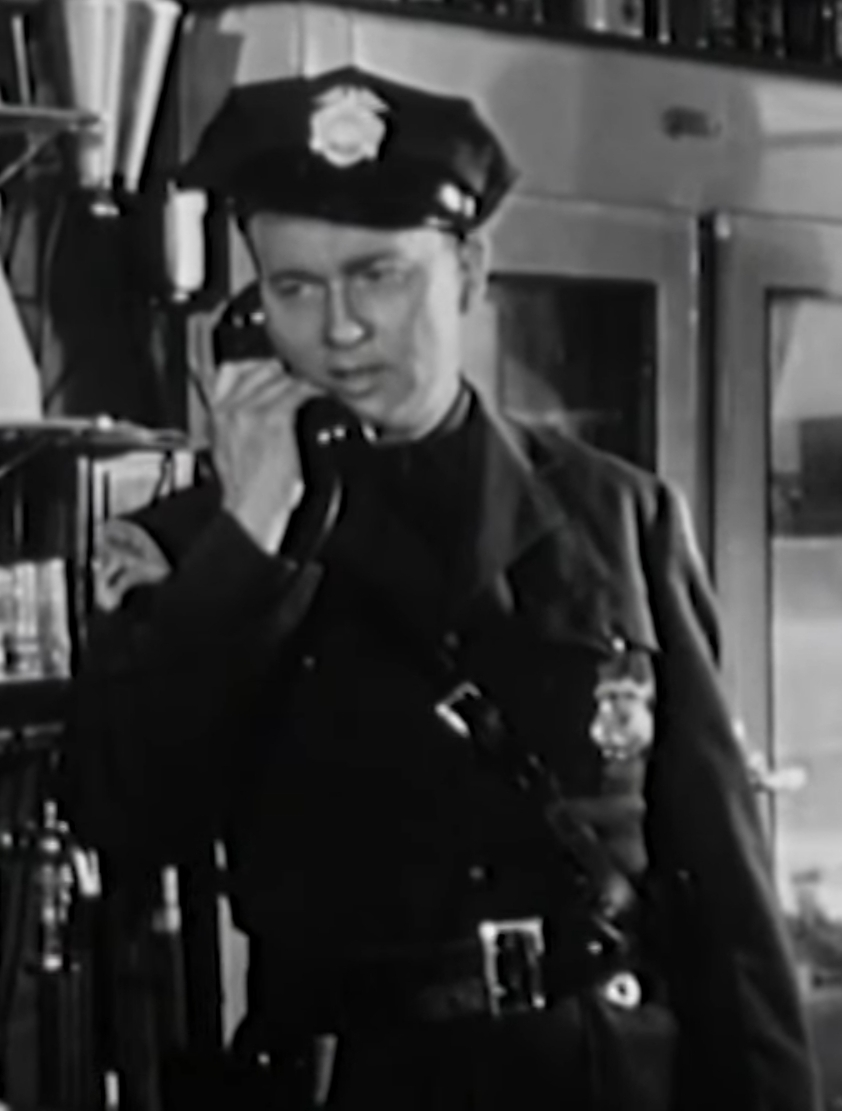
- Woodson in The Fast and the Furious (1954)
- Born: William T. Woodson; July 16, 1917
- Died: February 22, 2017 (aged 99)
- Occupation: Actor
- Years active: 1928–2010
- Spouse: Darlene Conley (m. 1959–1966)
- Children: 3

William T. Woodson (July 16, 1917 – February 22, 2017) was an American film, stage, radio and voice actor, best known for his narration of the radio series This is Your FBI, The Invaders, the animated series Super Friends and all its spin-offs beginning with The All New Superfriends Hour, and the opening of The Odd Couple television series.

== Biography ==
=== Stage career ===
Before becoming a professional actor, he acted in stock theatre for nearly a decade with his first appearance in a 1928 play.

In 1943, Bill Woodson made his Broadway debut as Lowell Denton in Harriet, starring Helen Hayes. He showed versatility as a performer, proving himself equally capable in classical roles such as that of Montano in the Shubert Theatre's adaptation of William Shakespeare's Othello with Paul Robeson in the lead role. From 1946–47, the actor played, what is probably his best-known stage role, Le Bret opposite Jose Ferrer as the title character in Cyrano de Bergerac.

He also appeared as Tom Mackenzie in The Seven Year Itch, Stephen Douglas in The Rivalry and T. Stedman Harder in A Moon for the Misbegotten.

In 1947, he was among the first actors to be accepted to the first class of the newly formed Actors Studio.

=== Radio career ===
Woodson served as the narrator for the crime drama series This is Your FBI from 1948–53 on ABC radio.

He also voiced multiple characters on episodes of several other radio programs such as Suspense, Inheritance and Family Theater.

=== Film and television career ===
Woodson had a on-screen role as Sergeant Ed Blankey on the 1959–1960 drama television series This Man Dawson and as Major Dudley in 1960 in an episode of the situation comedy The Tom Ewell Show. In 1967, he became the narrator for The Invaders. In 1963–1964, he portrayed the ringmaster on the ABC drama The Greatest Show on Earth. He also narrated for NFL Films.

In the 1970s, Woodson's television work included the opening narrative of The Odd Couple, the narration for the pilot of The Life and Times of Grizzly Adams, and a brief appearance on one episode of The Mary Tyler Moore Show. In 1977–1978, he was the voice of the sheriff on CB Bears on NBC.

He was also a featured but un-credited voice-over announcer for WKRP In Cincinnati. It was his voice, inviting the audience to stay tuned for the epilogue for each episode. He also did a number of voice roles in several episodes, including the pre-recorded announcer of the intro to Les Nessman's newscasts.

In 1983, the actor served as the narrator for the miniseries adaptation of Herman Wouk's novel The Winds of War, and its sequel miniseries, War and Remembrance also based on the sequel novel. In this capacity, he would explain to the television audience the large-scale historical events that provide the context for the storylines of the two miniseries.

=== Super Friends and voice acting career ===
William Woodson's legacy will be his long association with the Super Friends series, where he served as narrator and sometimes voiced additional characters. He took over the role from Ted Knight, who coincidentally had played Ted Baxter, the man Woodson's character hoped to replace during his appearance on The Mary Tyler Moore Show.

Woodson narrated each subsequent Super Friends episode, narrating over 100 episodes, including the 7-minute short subject episodes produced from 1980 to 1983. Perhaps his most memorable line from the series was the often-used phrase that accompanied a transition to scenes at the Super Friends' headquarters: "Meanwhile, at the Hall of Justice..."

In a 2011 interview, he explained that his pronunciation of the word super as "syuper" rather than "sooper", which is more usual in the U.S., was due to the criticism of his speech he had received in high school. Wishing to sound more sophisticated, he patterned his speech after that of Ronald Colman.

In addition, he also supplied the opening narration and voice for several characters on Battle of the Planets, as well as playing the sinister tanner in Walt Disney's The Small One. In 1981, he did the voice of J. Jonah Jameson in Spider-Man and that same year, he reprised the character on Spider-Man and his Amazing Friends, where he also played Namor the Submariner and Dr. Strange in the episode "7 Little Superheroes".

Woodson later guest-starred on Garfield and Friends, The Jetsons, Tiny Toon Adventures and Duckman and other shows.

=== Other acting work ===
In 1966, he played the Secretary of War in 3 episodes of F Troop.

He played the reporter in Stan Freberg's parody advertisement of Jacobsen Mowers, which were in actuality sheep grazing. In the satirical ad, he announced: "Jacobsen Mowers. Faster...than sheep!".

Bill Woodson was also the narrator of NFL Films' official films of Super Bowl II and he also narrated the 1967 NFL Championship Game, better known as the "Ice Bowl". The longtime voice of NFL Films, John Facenda, had been unavailable.

In 1994 Woodson was the voice of a television and radio advertising campaign celebrating the 30th anniversary of Pennsylvania-based Wawa convenience stores. The commercials humorously referenced 1964 events such as The Beatles' appearances on The Ed Sullivan Show and the introduction of the Ford Mustang. They were produced by Philadelphia ad agency Earle Palmer Brown & Spiro.

From 2004–2010, Woodson, a California resident, lent his austere deep voice to a series of humorous commercials promoting the Minnesota Twins. The ads had titles such as "The Minnesota Twins – Get to Know 'Em", "Every Fan Counts", and "This is Twins Territory". His voice can also be heard narrating in many Disney read-alongs.

=== Personal life ===
In 1959, Woodson married actress Darlene Conley. They divorced in 1966.

=== Death ===
He died on February 22, 2017, at the age of 99.

== Filmography ==
Year	Title	Role	Notes
1954	Pigs Is Pigs	Narrator	Voice, Uncredited
1955	The Fast and the Furious	Officer Samuels	Uncredited
1959–1960	This Man Dawson	Sergeant Ed Blankey	Regular cast, 31 episodes
1960	The Tom Ewell Show	Major Dudley	1 episode
1961	Sea Hunt	Dr. John Gregory	1 episode
1963	Leave it to Beaver	Mr. Gaines	1 episode
1969	More Dead Than Alive	Warden	
1971	Escape from the Planet of the Apes	Naval Officer	
1974	The Life and Times of Grizzly Adams	Narrator	Voice
1976	Tunnel Vision	Announcer	Voice
1983	The Winds of War	Narrator	Voice
1988	War and Remembrance	Narrator	Voice
1990	The Bonfire of the Vanities	Gene Lopwitz	Voice
1991	The Naked Gun 2½: The Smell of Fear	TV Commercial Announcer	Voice
