= Wally Burr =

American actor (1924–2017)

- Born: Walter Story Burr; June 2, 1924
- Died: July 9, 2017 (aged 93)
- Occupations: Television director, voice director, voice actor
- Years active: 1950–2017
- Children: 2
- Website: https://web.archive.org/web/20170917082345/http://wallyburr.com/

Walter Story Burr (June 2, 1924 – July 9, 2017), also credited as Wally Burr and Walter Burr, was an American voice actor and director.

As the voice director for The Transformers and The Transformers: The Movie, Burr was known for his perfectionist recording sessions that lasted eight hours. He voice directed several other cartoons during the 1980s, such as G.I. Joe, Jem, Inspector Gadget, and Spider-Man. Burr's vocal performances include The Atom on Super Friends, and Harvey Gabor on Jem, among others.

Burr served in the U.S. Army during World War II as a tank commander and saw action in Normandy. After the war, he was promoted to captain. He had two children.

== Filmography ==
=== Animation roles ===
- Crying Freeman - Larry Buck
- G.I. Joe - Captain Lukrov, Dr. Hamler (in "The Pit of Vipers")
- Jem - Harvey Gabor
- Spider-Man - Additional Voices
- Spider-Man - Voice Director
- The All-New Super Friends Hour - Atom
- The Skatebirds - Additional Voices
- The Transformers - Dancitron Promoter, Jazz (in Kremzeek!), King Nergill, Kremzeek, Ratchet (in "Masquerade"), Seaspray (in his PSA), Thundercracker (in "War Dawn")

=== Film roles ===
- Akira (1989 Streamline Dub) - Additional Voices
- Fist of the North Star - Raoh
- Pearl Harbor - Newsreel Voice

=== Video game roles ===
- Stonekeep - Big Sharda, Fil Ettin, Nigel Hardstone

== Crew work ==
- Akira (1989 Streamline Dub) - Voice Director (Uncredited)
- Bucky O'Hare - Voice Director
- Captain Caveman and the Teen Angels - Voice Director
- Clue Club - Voice Director
- Conan: The Adventurer - Voice Director
- Dino-Riders - Voice Director
- Dynomutt, Dog Wonder - Voice Director
- Exosquad - Casting Director (Season 1), Voice Director (Season 1)
- G.I. Joe - Voice Director
- G.I. Joe: The Movie - Voice Director
- Godzilla - Voice Director
- Hong Kong Phooey - Voice Director
- Inhumanoids - Voice Director
- Inspector Gadget - Voice Director (Season 1)
- Jem - Voice Director
- The Mumbly Cartoon Show - Voice Director
- My Little Pony Tales - Voice Director, Producer (Song Vocals)
- Rainbow Brite - Voice Director
- Spider-Man - Voice Director
- The Skatebirds - Voice Director
- The Transformers - Voice Director
- The Transformers: The Movie - Voice Director
- Valley of the Dinosaurs - Voice Director
- Visionaries: Knights of the Magical Light - Voice Director
- Wheelie and the Chopper Bunch - Voice Director
