= Michael Rye =

American actor (1918–2012)

- Born: John Michael Riorden Billsbury; March 2, 1918; Chicago, Illinois, U.S.
- Died: September 20, 2012 (aged 94); Los Angeles, California, U.S.
- Other name: Rye Billsbury
- Occupation: Actor
- Years active: 1939–1997
- Spouse: Patricia Foster

Michael Rye (born John Michael Riorden Billsbury; March 2, 1918 – September 20, 2012) was an American actor. His decades-long career spanned radio, television, animated cartoons and video games. Aside from his voice over work, Rye also acted in on-screen television roles as well, including parts in Dr. Kildare and 77 Sunset Strip.

He is also credited in TL Osborn's gospel documentaries as the narrator.

== Early life ==
Rye was born John Michael Riorden Billsbury in Chicago, Illinois.

== Radio career ==
He began his career during the Golden Age of Radio when radio programming was at the height of its popularity. Rye, who broadcast from Chicago, participated in an average of forty network radio shows per week.

He was cast in numerous lead roles for radio shows, including Gary Curtis for the NBC soap opera, Ma Perkins; Tim Lawrence on Guiding Light; Jack Armstrong on the radio adventure series, Jack Armstrong, the All-American Boy; and Pembroke in the soap opera, Backstage Wife.

He starred in radio productions produced and broadcast from Hollywood, including the ABC crime drama, This is Your FBI; the radio anthology series, Lux Radio Theater; the radio drama, The Whistler; the CBS radio comedy, Meet Millie; and the CBS drama, Suspense. He also provided the narration for the world's first full-length recorded book, the 1969 audio adaptation of The Autobiography of Benjamin Franklin.

== Animation ==
With the advent of television, Rye transitioned from radio to animated shows and on-screen acting roles. In addition to lending his sonorous bass-baritone voice as the Lone Ranger in the 1966–1969 animated cartoon series based on the character, for which he is perhaps best remembered, Rye worked extensively in Hanna-Barbera productions, including the Scooby-Doo series during the 1970s, and later provided voices for Pound Puppies, which aired on ABC's Saturday morning lineup from 1986 to 1989. During this time, he also played Mr. Slaghoople, Wilma's Dad in The Flintstone Kids.

He voiced both Apache Chief and Green Lantern in Hanna-Barbera's Challenge of the Superfriends, The All-New Super Friends Hour, and Super Friends.

He was also cast in Disney's Adventures of the Gummi Bears, which aired from 1985 to 1991, as the voices of King Gregor and his nemesis Duke Igthorn, who is the nemesis of the Gummi Bears as well.

== Television ==
Rye's on-screen television roles included parts on Schlitz Playhouse of Stars, M Squad, 77 Sunset Strip, General Electric Theater, Dr. Kildare, and Wagon Train.

== Later career ==
Rye appeared in television and radio commercials until his retirement from advertising in the late 1990s. His career, which began in radio, also spanned the video game era in the 1980s, 1990s, and 2000s. Rye narrated thousands of training films, videos and software for industrial and workplace functions.

Rye served as the National President of the Information Film Producers of America (IFPA) in the 1970s for a single two-year term. He was also inducted as an honorary, lifetime member of Sperdvac, the Society to Preserve and Encourage Radio Drama, Variety and Comedy.

== Death ==
Michael Rye died from a short illness on September 20, 2012, in Los Angeles at the age of 94. He was survived by his wife, Patricia Foster Rye.

== Filmography ==
=== Live action ===
- Hands of a Stranger - George Britton
- Two Lost Worlds - Captain Hackett
- The Adventures of Rin Tin Tin - Ace Rocklin (ep. "Pritikin's Predicament")
- Jane Wyman Presents - Fred Jackson (ep. "The Bravado Touch")
- Wagon Train - Hanlon (ep. "The Liam Fitzmorgan Story")
- M Squad - Carlson (ep. "The Crush Out")
- Perry Mason - Commentator (ep. "The Story of the Laughing Lady")
- Mr. Terrific - The President (ep. "I Can't Fly")
- Mission: Impossible - Agent Belson (ep. "The Traitor")

=== Animated roles ===
- A Pup Named Scooby-Doo - Skippy Johnson, Arnie Barney
- The All-New Super Friends Hour - Apache Chief, Green Lantern
- Battle of the Planets - President Kane, Additional Voices
- Challenge of the Superfriends - Apache Chief, Green Lantern
- Disney's Adventures of the Gummi Bears - Duke Igthorn, King Gregor, Sir Gawain
- DuckTales - Narrator (for the recap sequences in the serialized versions of Time is Money and Super DuckTales)
- Hot Wheels - Jack "Rabbit" Wheeler
- Skyhawks - Captain Mike Wilson
- Mighty Man and Yukk - Main Title Narrator
- Pink Panther and Sons - Additional Voices
- Scooby and Scrappy-Doo - Additional Voices
- Shirt Tales - Additional Voices
- Snorks - Additional Voices
- Spider-Man - Mysterio
- Spider-Man and His Amazing Friends - Magneto
- Spider-Man: The Animated Series - Farley Stillwell
- Super Friends - Apache Chief, Green Lantern
- Super Friends: The Legendary Super Powers Show - Apache Chief, Green Lantern
- The 13 Ghosts of Scooby-Doo - Demondo, Zimbulu, Reflector Specter
- The Adventures of Don Coyote and Sancho Panda - Additional Voices
- The All-New Scooby and Scrappy-Doo Show - Additional Voices
- The Dukes - Additional Voices
- The Flintstone Kids - Mr. Slaghoople
- The Greatest Adventure: Stories from the Bible - Narrator
- The Godzilla Power Hour - Additional Voices
- The Incredible Hulk - The Supreme Hydra/Steve Perry, Jasper Bryn
- The Lone Ranger - Lone Ranger
- The Mork & Mindy / Laverne & Shirley / Fonz Hour - Additional Voices
- The Plastic Man Comedy/Adventure Show - Main Title Narrator
- The Real Ghostbusters - Dr. Crowley
- The Scooby & Scrappy-Doo/Puppy Hour - Additional Voices
- The Smurfs - Additional Voices
- The Super Globetrotters - Narrator
- The Super Powers Team: Galactic Guardians - Green Lantern
- Yogi's Treasure Hunt - Additional Voices
- Fluppy Dogs - J. J. Wagstaff

=== Films ===
- Hugo the Hippo - Grownups
- Scooby-Doo Meets the Boo Brothers - Mayor
- Yogi and the Invasion of the Space Bears - Ranger Jones

=== Video games ===
- Dragon's Lair - Narrator
- Space Ace - Narrator
- Dragon's Lair II: Time Warp - Narrator

=== Information film narrator ===
- Various Productions for Aerojet-General Corporation Sacramento
- Various Productions for Air Force Space & Missile Systems Center

=== Radio ===
- Announcer on The Cisco Kid (1943–1945)
- Jack Armstrong on Jack Armstrong, the All-American Boy (1944–1946)
- The Narrator on Mystery House (1944–1946)
- Announcer on Joyce Jordan, M.D. (1944–1947)
- Mr. First Nighter on The First Nighter Program (1945–1954)
- Gary Curtis on Ma Perkins (1945–1959)
- Reverend Dr. John Ruthledge on Guiding Light (1947–49, replacing Arthur Peterson, Jr.)
- Mark Dillon in the first Gunsmoke audition show (1949)
- Several roles on Backstage Wife (1940s)
- Hank Stafford on Granby's Green Acres (1950)
- Johnny Booth Jr. on Meet Millie (1951–1954)
- Several roles on Dangerous Assignment (1953)
- Several roles on Lux Radio Theater (1950s)
- Announcer on The Horizons West Show (1965–1966)
