= Danny Dark =

American voice-over artist (1938–2004)

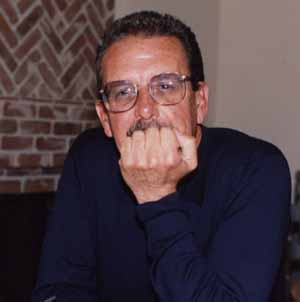
- Born: Daniel Melville Croskery; December 19, 1938; Oklahoma City, Oklahoma, U.S.
- Died: June 13, 2004 (aged 65); Los Angeles, California, U.S.
- Education: Drury University
- Occupations: Voice actor, voice-over performer, announcer
- Years active: 1958–2004

Danny Dark (December 19, 1938 – June 13, 2004) was an American voice-over artist. For nearly four decades, he narrated memorable lines in advertisements for Budweiser ("This Bud's for you"), Raid Ant & Roach Killer ("Raid - Kills Bugs Dead"), StarKist tuna ("Sorry, Charlie") and Parkay ("Parkay Margarine from Kraft. The flavor says 'butter'."). The trade paper Radio & Records said, "Dark's distinctive voice has been heard in more award-winning commercials than any announcer in broadcast history." Dark is also well remembered for voicing Superman in the various incarnations of the Super Friends animated series (1973–1985).

== Biography ==
=== Early life and career ===
Dark was born Daniel Melville Croskery in Oklahoma City, Oklahoma, but his family moved to Tulsa, shortly after. He attended Tulsa Central High School, where he studied under a well-known teacher of future performers, Isabelle Ronan. He started in Missouri as a radio D.J. in the late 1950s, while studying at Drury University. He quickly advanced to stations in Cleveland, Miami, New Orleans, St. Louis, finally landing a 1963-66 stint as the evening DJ for KLAC in Los Angeles.

=== Notable voice-over work ===
Over the course of his career, Dark was the spokesman for Keebler Cookies, the Chevrolet Camaro, AT&T, Kmart, Texaco, Armor-All, Whitman's Chocolates, Dreyer's Ice Cream, and many other Blue Chip companies. Dark was the voice of the long-running TV western Bonanza, voicing their intermission commercials for the program's sponsor, Chevrolet. Dark was an announcer who came to be known as the "voice" of the CBS network during the 1970s and later, on the NBC television network during the 1980s and early 1990s, doing promo advertisements for night-time programming, as well as an announcer for NBC's flagship station, WNBC-TV, and the imaging voice for many of the network's affiliates and O&O stations for their local newscasts. Dark also provided the "This program is about Unsolved Mysteries..." opening narration for the popular 80s and 90s true crime series. He also voiced the NBC News 1983 "Go Where The News Is" advertising campaign.

He voiced the role of Superman/Clark Kent for twelve years, from 1973 to 1985, in each of the various incarnations of Hanna-Barbera's animated series Super Friends. He also narrated historical documentaries for the Biographical series on History Channel, including Johnny Cash: The Man in Black, and General Robert E. Lee.

His only film roles were in the 1976 film Tunnel Vision and as an announcer in 1980's Melvin and Howard starring Jason Robards.

=== Death ===
Dark died in Los Angeles of a pulmonary hemorrhage and was interred in Westwood Village Memorial Park Cemetery.
