= Lego DC Comics Super Heroes: Justice League – Gotham City Breakout =

- Directed by: Matt Peters; Melchior Zwyer
- Screenplay by: James Krieg
- Starring: Troy Baker; Sarah Hyland; Nolan North; Khary Payton
- Music by: Tim Kelly
- Production companies: Warner Bros. Animation; LEGO; DC Entertainment
- Distributed by: Warner Home Video
- Release dates: June 21, 2016 (Digital); July 12, 2016 (DVD and Blu-ray)
- Running time: 78 minutes
- Country: United States
- Language: English

Lego DC Comics Super Heroes: Justice League – Gotham City Breakout is a 2016 American animated superhero comedy film based on the Lego and DC Comics brands, which was released on June 21, 2016 in Digital HD and on July 12, 2016 on Blu-ray and DVD. It is the sixth Lego DC Comics film following Lego Batman: The Movie – DC Super Heroes Unite, Lego DC Comics: Batman Be-Leaguered, Lego DC Comics Super Heroes: Justice League vs. Bizarro League, Lego DC Comics Super Heroes: Justice League – Attack of the Legion of Doom and Lego DC Comics Super Heroes: Justice League – Cosmic Clash. Some actors from various DC properties reprise their respective roles, including Nolan North as Superman, Grey DeLisle as Wonder Woman and Troy Baker as Batman. The film received positive reviews, with praise for the action, although the consumerism was criticized.

== Plot ==
Batman and Robin chase Penguin and Harley Quinn, and after defeating Harley and Poison Ivy, Batman leaves Robin with the defeated criminals and chases after a criminal who resembles a ninja. After cornering the criminal in an alleyway, Batman is able to deduce that he is Nightwing, who was attempting to lure Batman into a surprise birthday party. Batgirl, Robin and Nightwing reveal that as a present for Batman, they decided to take him on vacation. Superman is willing to temporarily replace Batman, believing that Gotham's criminals would be easy to defeat due to most lacking superpowers. The Justice League and Teen Titans are able to convince Batman to accept the vacation, while Robin stays behind to help Superman.

Meanwhile, at Arkham Asylum, Joker escapes by digging out with a spoon, and Batman figures out that Nightwing and Batgirl plan to have him visit the dojo of his former martial arts sensei, Madame Mantis. After a brief reunion battle with his former sensei, Batman discovers it was actually a disguised minion of Deathstroke. Batman, Batgirl, and Nightwing then find Deathstroke and follow him into a cave.

Meanwhile, in Gotham City, Superman finds out about Joker's escape and ignores Robin's warning about him. Unfortunately, this allows Joker to trick Superman into freeing Harley Quinn, Penguin, Poison Ivy and Scarecrow from Arkham. Superman calls Cyborg in hopes of gaining assistance to stop the escaped villains.

Batman, Nightwing, and Batgirl end up falling down a waterfall in the cave. Batman explains his past with Deathstroke. At the bottom of the waterfall, Batman, Nightwing, and Batgirl discover an underground kingdom of Trogowogs (a hidden underground race of short, green humanoids). They immediately attack Batman, who ultimately surrenders to Deathstroke when the latter threatens to kill Nightwing and Batgirl. They are then introduced to the Trogowog leader, Bane, who gained his position using a pink crystal known as the Psyche Stone.

Back in Gotham, Poison Ivy easily defeats Superman and Cyborg. Superman reluctantly summons Wonder Woman, but Poison Ivy stuns them with her pheromones. By the time the effect wears off, they have been taken to Joker's funhouse where they are doused with Scarecrow's fear gas and put them in molten Kryptonite and more pheromones to be boiled into soup. Robin notices this and goes to save the Justice League.

Back in the Trogowog kingdom, Batman, Nightwing and Batgirl are held in the dungeon, stripped of their utility belts and imprisoned with Madame Mantis and Trogowog prince Grungle (the only one not to fall victim to the Psyche Stone). Grungle reveals that the Trogowogs were once a peaceful and friendly race until Bane killed his father, imprisoned him, and used the Psyche Stone to make the Trogowogs more violent. Batman frees them with a brick separator, but they are recaptured and Batman reluctantly uses the Psyche Stone to learn the "Forbidden Move", which creates destructive chi projectiles.

Back in Gotham, Robin saves the captive League members and they shake off the pheromones. Robin and the League then leave the amusement park, causing the villains to believe that Gotham is now defenseless and theirs for the taking. Superman apologizes for ignoring Robin's warnings and Robin teaches the League the skills they need to defeat the villains.

Meanwhile, Batman and Deathstroke use a Bat-Drill to disorient the Trogowog army, but are overwhelmed. Batman reveals that he planted a dance bug in their bodies that immediately shatters the army, and Grungle uses Madame Mantis' training to defeat Bane.

In Gotham, Scarecrow, Penguin, and Poison Ivy are defeated and put back in Arkham Asylum. Joker and Harley Quinn kidnap Commissioner Gordon, but are ultimately defeated and also sent back to Arkham. In the Trogowog kingdom, Bane is imprisoned, Grungle is made king, and the Psyche Stone is used to restore the Trogowogs to normal. Back in the Batcave, the League and Titans discuss not to mention any of the events that happened while Batman was gone. When Batman, Batgirl and Nightwing do return, Superman confesses. To his surprise, Batman congratulates him, Wonder Woman, Cyborg, and Robin for putting them back in Arkham. The Justice League and Teen Titans then continue their party.

== Cast ==
- Troy Baker as Bruce Wayne / Batman
- Eric Bauza as Bane, Commissioner Gordon
- Greg Cipes as Garfield Logan / Beast Boy
- John DiMaggio as Deathstroke, Scarecrow
- Will Friedle as Nightwing / Dick Grayson
- Grey Griffin as Diana Prince / Wonder Woman
- Amy Hill as Madame Mantis
- Sarah Hyland as Batgirl
- Tom Kenny as Penguin
- Vanessa Marshall as Poison Ivy
- Scott Menville as Robin / Damian Wayne
- Nolan North as Kal-El / Clark Kent / Superman
- Khary Payton as Victor Stone / Cyborg
- Jason Spisak as Joker, Grungle
- Tara Strong as Harley Quinn
- Hynden Walch as Koriand'r / Starfire

In the end credits, the acknowledgement for the Batman should appear as "Batman created by Bob Kane with Bill Finger" as stated in the September 2015 DC Entertainment announcement.

== Reception ==
The film earned $1,297,406 from domestic DVD sales and $509,376 from domestic Blu-ray sales, bringing its total domestic home video earnings to $1,806,782.
