= Lego DC Comics Super Heroes: Justice League – Cosmic Clash =

- Blu-ray Cover
- Directed by: Rick Morales
- Screenplay by: Jim Krieg
- Based on: DC Comics
- Produced by: Brandon Vietti
- Starring: Troy Baker; Grey Griffin; Phil LaMarr; Nolan North; James Arnold Taylor
- Music by: Tim Kelly
- Production companies: Warner Bros. Animation; LEGO; DC Entertainment
- Distributed by: Warner Home Video
- Release dates: February 9, 2016 (Digital); March 1, 2016 (Blu-ray and DVD)
- Running time: 78 minutes
- Country: United States
- Language: English

Lego DC Comics Super Heroes: Justice League – Cosmic Clash is a 2016 American animated superhero comedy film based on the Lego and DC Comics brands, which was released on February 9, 2016, on Digital HD and March 1, 2016, on Blu-ray and DVD. It is the fifth Lego DC Comics film following Lego Batman: The Movie – DC Super Heroes Unite, Lego DC Comics: Batman Be-Leaguered, Lego DC Comics Super Heroes: Justice League vs. Bizarro League and Lego DC Comics Super Heroes: Justice League – Attack of the Legion of Doom. Some actors from various DC properties reprised their respective roles, including Nolan North as Superman and Khary Payton as Cyborg. The film received positive reviews, with critics deeming it superior to past films in the Lego DC Comics film series.

== Plot ==
The cyborg alien Brainiac goes to Earth, intending to shrink it and add it to his collection of miniature planets. However, when he arrives, the Justice League easily drives him away from the planet. Brainiac then formulates a new plan to obtain Earth, which he puts into action shortly thereafter: when the Justice League members Wonder Woman, Green Lantern, and Superman attempt to stop him again, he sends each of them to a different time period. Batman and the Flash then construct a time machine called the Cosmic Treadmill, allowing the two to travel throughout time and rescue their teammates. After the two leave, Brainiac begins attacking the planet; Cyborg then calls in Supergirl to help him defend the city.

Batman and the Flash first travel to the Stone Age, where Wonder Woman has been placed. While the Flash stays behind to power the machine and keep it in the time period that it is in, as the machine is powered by the Flash running on it, Batman goes to rescue Wonder Woman. Shortly afterwards, Batman encounters Vandal Savage and both are captured and taken to a tribe of cave dwellers, which Wonder Woman is revealed to be in charge of. Batman discovers that Wonder Woman lost her memories as a result of her time travel, such that she now believes herself to be the queen of the cave dwellers. Batman then challenges her to fight. In the fight, he manages to obtain Wonder Woman's lasso of truth, which he uses to restore her memories. After her memories are restored, she is teleported to the present to stabilize the time stream.

Batman rejoins the Flash and travels to 1741, where Green Lantern has become convinced that he is a deckhand on a pirate ship under the control of Captain Fear; Batman restores Green Lantern's memories with his power ring, causing Green Lantern to return to the present.

Batman and the Flash travel to the future to rescue Superman, but they are attacked by Superman, who is being mind-controlled by a future Brainiac. During the attack, Superman partially destroys the treadmill, sending the Flash back to the present. Batman is then saved by a future superhero group called the Resistance made up of Legion of Super-Heroes members Cosmic Boy, Lightning Lad, and Saturn Girl. This group helps him evade Superman and travel to the Batcave, where both of them engage in a fight; Batman, rather than using kryptonite, instead uses concentrated yellow sunlight enough to melt down Brainiac and power up Superman, restoring his mind and teleporting him to the present. However, Batman is left behind.

In the present, the Justice League (minus Batman) battles Brainiac's forces until Brainiac, who has finished studying the planet, decides to shrink Earth and place it in a bottle. Batman arrives from the future with a piece of technology that the Resistance gave him. Cyborg reveals that he has built aerial vehicles for the Justice League, which they use to remove the bottle cap from the inside and escape the bottle. While most of the Justice League battles Brainiac, Batman sneaks inside of Brainiac's head and reconfigures his shrink ray to turn it into a growth ray; Brainiac accidentally enlarges Earth and the Justice League to their normal sizes. The Justice League pacifies and imprisons Brainiac, then celebrates their victory with a game of Hide & Seek.

== Cast ==
- Troy Baker as Bruce Wayne / Batman
- Nolan North as Kal-El / Clark Kent / Superman
- Grey Griffin as Diana Prince / Wonder Woman
- Jessica DiCicco as Kara Zor-El / Supergirl
- Josh Keaton as Hal Jordan / Green Lantern
- Phil LaMarr as Brainiac
- Yuri Lowenthal as Cosmic Boy
- Andy Milder as Lightning Lad
- Phil Morris as Vandal Savage
- Khary Payton as Victor Stone / Cyborg
- Jason Spisak as Captain Fear
- James Arnold Taylor as Barry Allen / Flash
- Kari Wahlgren as Saturn Girl

== Reception ==
The film earned $1,230,213 from domestic DVD sales and $640,580 from domestic Blu-ray sales, bringing its total domestic home video earnings to $1,870,793. DVD Talk rated the film as "Recommended".
