= List of fictional space stations =

This is a list of fictional space stations that have been identified by name in notable published works of fiction and science fiction.

A space station (or orbital station) is a spacecraft capable of supporting a crew, which is designed to remain in space (most commonly in low Earth orbit) for an extended period of time and for other spacecraft to dock. A space station is distinguished from other spacecraft used for human spaceflight by lack of major propulsion or landing systems. Instead, other vehicles transport people and cargo to and from the station.

== Space stations ==
- Abercrombie Station
- Allied Pacific Consortium Space Station Coral Sea (Star Cops)
- Anchor 9 (“Halo”)
- The American Freedom Star in EndWar
- Anshin - Japanese commercial space station in geocentric orbit, from the 2022 animated series The Orbital Children
- The Ark (The 100)
- Arkbird, a "maneuverable orbiting spacecraft" designed to vaporize asteroid fragments in the atmosphere (Ace Combat 5: The Unsung War)
- Armistice Station (Battlestar Galactica, 2004 TV series)
- Armstrong Space Station - U.S military space station from Dale Brown novels, also known as the Silver Tower due to its silver, anti-laser construction (Silver Tower)
- Asteroid M (Marvel Comics), often residence of Magneto
- Athens, Cairo and Malta - "Magnetic Acceleration Cannon"-stations, a part of a larger geosynchronous orbital defence cluster built to protect Earth (Halo 2)
- Babylon 4 – Diplomatic space station, 'missing' and presumed destroyed (Babylon 5)
- Babylon 5 – Diplomatic space station (Babylon 5)
- Battle School (Ender's Game)
- Blur Star Gamma - non-orbital refinery platform (Earth-Star Voyager, 1988 TV movie/pilot)
- The Bunker - space station orbiting Earth (Nier: Automata)
- The Citadel (Mass Effect)
- Citadel Station (System Shock)
- Clarke Station - space station orbiting Jupiter (Starhunter and Starhunter 2300)
- Cooper Station (Interstellar)
- Death Egg (Sonic The Hedgehog)
- Death Star (Star Wars)
- Deep Space Nine - Originally orbital ore processing station Terok Nor, later moved out of orbit and refitted as a multipurpose space station (Star Trek: Deep Space Nine)
- Democracy Space Station - Abbreviated as DSS, is an interplanetary battle station capable of FTL travel and utilized as a strategic weapon by the Super Earth Armed Forces (Helldivers 2)
- Earth Spacedock - a large space station in the Star Trek universe, first seen in Star Trek III: The Search for Spock
- Elysium (Elysium (film))
- Empok Nor - abandoned Cardassian space station identical in design to Deep Space Nine (Star Trek: Deep Space Nine)
- Euro-Space Station Charles De Gaulle (Star Cops)
- Exodus (Call of Duty: Ghosts)
- Florida Arklab (The Noah's Ark Principle)
- Gamma 3 (The Green Slime)
- Gargantua-2 (The Venture Bros.)
- Gateway Station (Aliens (film))
- The Halo Array (Halo)
- Hawk Haven (Silverhawks)
- ISPV 7 (Planetes)
- Kuat Drive Yards - massive orbital shipbuilding facility in the Kuat system, (Star Wars)
- Life One (Astronaut: The Last Push)
- Midway Station - small space station, part of the McKay-Carter Intergalactic Gate Bridge, located between the Milky Way Galaxy and Pegasus Galaxy with 2 stargates (Stargate Atlantis)
- MS One, orbital prison in the 2012 film Lockout
- Nerva Station, The Ark in Space episode of Doctor Who
- The Nexus (Mass Effect: Andromeda)
- Oberon (Planet of the Apes (2001 film))
- Omega - Mined out asteroid and safe haven for criminals (Mass Effect 2 and Mass Effect 3)
- Operation SOS (Spaced Out) - a space station that is designed to house a suburban neighborhood with a glass dome that emulates an artificial sky.
- Orbital Defense Initiative (ODIN, later rebuilt as LOKI) - Space-based weapons station in Call of Duty: Ghosts which fires tungsten rods at targets on earth. Used to destroy San Diego, Las Vegas, and a fictional missile launch base in South America.
- Orbit ring united earth tekkaman blade 1992
- The Peak, headquarters of S.W.O.R.D. (Marvel Comics)
- Pell Station (Downbelow Station)
- Phoebe Station (The Expanse (TV series))
- The PLANTS (Mobile Suit Gundam SEED & Mobile Suit Gundam SEED Destiny) are a space-colony that was constructed for genetically-enhanced humans to live on.
- Ragnar Anchorage - Battlestar Galactica (2004)
- Ring Shepherd - space station orbiting Saturn (Starhunter and Starhunter 2300)
- R.U. Sirius - Brewster Rockit: Space Guy!
- Satellite 5 - Large crewed broadcasting base in Doctor Who
- Second Earth - a massive space station orbiting Earth in the anime series Blue Gender
- Sevastopol - a failed space outpost startup orbiting a gas giant; fell into a suborbital trajectory following the explosion of the Anesidora and destroyed on atmospheric entry. (Alien: Isolation)
- Silver Star - the main space station orbiting Earth in the anime series Gunbuster, serving as a training facility for space cadets and as a port for the constructors of the series main battleships
- Skylab Workshop Station (Kerbal Space Program)
- SLAMS (EndWar and H.A.W.X)
- Solaris Station, featured in Solaris (1961 novel) and the films Solaris (1968), Solaris (1972) and Solaris (2002) The screenplay and commentary on the DVD of the 2002 film refers to it as the Prometheus Station.
- Space Academy (Space Academy) https://www.imdb.com/title/tt0075585/
- Space Bass (LittleBigPlanet Karting)
- Space City (Blake's 7)
- Space Colony ARK (Sonic Adventure 2)
- Space Station Ronald Reagan (Star Cops)
- Space Station V - Rotating wheel space station (2001: A Space Odyssey)
- Starbase 47 "Vanguard" - Star Trek Vanguard
- Strategic Orbital Linear Gun (SOLG), a kinetic energy penetrator and MIRV platform (Ace Combat 5: The Unsung War and Ace Combat Infinity)
- Supra-New York - appears in many Robert A. Heinlein juvenile novels and the adult novel Friday.
- Syncsat Five (Rendezvous with Rama)
- Talos I (Prey)
- Terra Station (Space Cadet)
- Terraport Station ULC-53 (Android)
- Thunderbird 5 (Thunderbirds)
- Ticonderoga, Fleet Battlestation - Starship Troopers
- Titan Station, colloquially known as "The Sprawl" (Dead Space 2)
- Tycho Station - asteroid belt space station (The Expanse)
- Venus Equilateral - communications station connecting Earth, Mars, Venus, and the Moon in George O. Smith's series of hard science fiction stories set on the station.
- The Villa Straylight (Neuromancer)
- Watcher's Nest - a massive space station with 10 million inhabitants in the anime series Divergence Eve
- Vesper Station (Subnautica Below Zero)
- Von Doom Industries Space Station research station ( Fantastic Four )
- Watchtower (Justice League)
- World's Fair (Earth Star Voyager)
- XK-72 (Blake's 7)
- Yang Liwei (World War Z)
- Yorktown (Star Trek Beyond)
- Zeus Cannon - an Olympic-class assault space station equipped with an extremely powerful beam cannon orbiting the Earth in the movie Final Fantasy: The Spirits Within
- Unnamed station ( Lupin III: Voyage to Danger)

== See also ==
- List of fictional spacecraft
- Military spacecraft in fiction
- Space dock
- Space tourism
- Spacecraft
- Starship
- Unidentified flying object
