= The Super Powers Team: Galactic Guardians =

- The title card for The Super Powers Team: Galactic Guardians series
- Genre: Adventure; Fantasy; Science fiction
- Created by: E. Nelson Bridwell; Carmine Infantino
- Based on: Justice League by: Gardner Fox
- Written by: Alan Burnett; John Loy; Antoni Zalewski
- Directed by: Oscar Dufau; Tony Love; Rudy Zamora; Bill Hutton
- Creative director: Iwao Takamoto
- Voices of: Jack Angel; René Auberjonois; William Callaway; Danny Dark; Ernie Hudson; Casey Kasem; Michael Rye; Mark L. Taylor; B. J. Ward; Frank Welker; Adam West
- Narrated by: William Woodson
- Theme music composer: Hoyt Curtin
- Composer: Hoyt Curtin
- Country of origin: United States
- Original language: English
- No. of episodes: 8 (10 segments) (list of episodes)

Production
- Executive producers: William Hanna; Joseph Barbera
- Producer: Larry Latham
- Editors: Roy Braverman; (sound effects editor); Paul Vitello; (sound editor)
- Running time: 22 minutes (11 minutes per segment)
- Production companies: Hanna-Barbera Productions; DC Comics

Original release
- Network: ABC
- Release: September 7 – October 26, 1985

Related
- Super Friends (1973); The All-New Super Friends Hour; Challenge of the Superfriends; The World's Greatest SuperFriends; Super Friends (1980); Super Friends: The Legendary Super Powers Show

The Super Powers Team: Galactic Guardians is an American animated television series about a team of superheroes that ran in 1985. It was produced by Hanna-Barbera Productions and is based on the Justice League and associated comic book characters published by DC Comics.

== Production history ==
In the fall of 1985, the final version of Hanna-Barbera's Super Friends premiered. The Justice League of America (now called the Super Powers Team, to tie-in with the Super Powers Collection toyline then being produced by Kenner) were once again headquartered at the Hall of Justice in Metropolis, and battled familiar foes such as Darkseid, Lex Luthor and Scarecrow.

Amidst those changes, another change in the series was the absence of a narrator in every episode. Furthermore, the majority of the original recurring characters of the series were eliminated outside of Samurai and El Dorado, while Firestorm returned and Cyborg joined the team.

The storylines in many of the 1985 episodes were also a bit more dramatic compared to previous installments. The only episodes that featured the old Super Friends style and charm were "The Bizarro Super Powers Team" and "The Case of the Stolen Powers". Except where noted as a short, each episode was 30 minutes long. The show lasted only one season on ABC, marking the end of Hanna-Barbera's 12-year run of the Super Friends.

== Characters ==
=== The Super Powers Team aka The Justice League ===
- Superman
- Wonder Woman
- Batman
- Robin
- Cyborg
- Aquaman

- Firestorm
- Hawkman
- Green Lantern
- The Flash
- Samurai
- El Dorado

=== Apokolips ===
- Darkseid (voiced by Frank Welker): Following on from the previous season, Darkseid still had two goals: conquer Earth, and marry Wonder Woman; despite his power, the Super Powers Team managed to best him time and again.
- DeSaad
- Kalibak
- The Parademons (voiced by Frank Welker) are Darkseid's foot soldiers. They are referred to as Para-Drones for censorship purposes.

=== Individual villains ===
- Lex Luthor only appeared briefly at the beginning of "The Seeds of Doom".
- The Joker appears in the episode "The Wild Cards".
- The Royal Flush Gang appears in the episode "The Wild Cards".
- Scarecrow appears in the episode "The Fear".
- Brainiac appears in the episode "Brain Child".
- Felix Faust appears in the episode "The Case of the Stolen Powers".
- The Penguin
- Mister Mxyzptlk: In this series, Mxyzptlk's name is pronounced as "Miks-ill-plik" and he takes to tormenting all the members of the team, even when Superman is absent.
- Bizarro
- Mister Kltpzyxm is Mxyzptlk's Bizarro counterpart.
- Bizarro Wonder Woman
- Cyborg's Bizarro counterpart.
- Firestorm's Bizarro counterpart.

== Cast ==
- Jack Angel – Flash / Barry Allen, Hawkman, Samurai
- René Auberjonois – DeSaad
- Joe Baker – Bizarro Supermen (in "The Bizarro Super Powers Team"), Warden Johnson (in "The Bizarro Super Powers Team")
- Steve Bulen – Teenager Bruce Wayne (in "The Fear"), Dr. Moko (in "Escape from Space City")
- William Callaway – Aquaman
- Peter Cullen – Felix Faust (in "The Case of the Stolen Powers"), Ghast (in "The Case of the Stolen Powers")
- Danny Dark – Superman, Bizarro #1 (in "The Bizarro Super Powers Team")
- Robert DoQui – Strawman #3 (in "The Fear"), Robotic Cyborg (in "Brainchild")
- Patty Glick – Reporter (in "The Case of the Stolen Powers")
- Arlene Golonka – Sarah Simms (in "The Seeds of Doom"), Queen (in "The Wild Cards")
- Darryl Hickman – Steve Trevor (in "The Darkseid Deception")
- Jerry Houser – Jack (in "The Wild Cards")
- Ernie Hudson – Cyborg, Bizarro-Cyborg (in "The Bizarro Super Powers Team")
- G. Stanley Jones – Lex Luthor (in "The Seeds of Doom"), Reporter (in "The Death of Superman")
- Casey Kasem – Robin
- Paul Kirby – Thomas Wayne (in "The Fear")
- Lucy Lee – Martha Wayne (in "The Fear")
- Sidney Miller – Commissioner Gordon (in "The Fear"), Strawman #4 (in "The Fear")
- Haunani Minn – Princess Aliana (in "The Ghost Ship"), Kiri Moko (in "Escape from Space City")
- Lynne Moody – Ten (in "The Wild Cards")
- Robert Morse – Penguin (in "The Case of the Stolen Powers")
- Stanley Ralph Ross – Brainiac (in "Brainchild")
- Michael Rye – Green Lantern, Joe Chill (in "The Fear"), Strawman #1 (in "The Fear")
- Ken Sansom – Martin Stein
- Andre Stojka – Scarecrow (in "The Fear"), Alfred Pennyworth (in "The Fear"), Guard #2 (in "The Fear"), Strawman #2 (in "The Fear")
- Mark L. Taylor – Firestorm, Bizarro-Firestorm (in "The Bizarro Super Powers Team")
- Dick Tufeld – Announcer
- B.J. Ward – Wonder Woman, Bizarro Wonder Woman (in "The Bizarro Super Powers Team"), Young Bruce Wayne (in "The Fear")
- Frank Welker – Darkseid, Kalibak, Paradrones, Joker/Ace (in "The Wild Cards"), Mister Mxyzptlk (in "The Bizarro Super Powers Team"), Mister Kltpzyxm (in "The Bizarro Super Powers Team")
- Adam West – Batman
- Eugene Williams – King (in "The Wild Cards")
- Bill Woodson – Narrator

== Episodes ==
No. overall	No. in season	Title	Written by	Original release date
86	1	"The Seeds of Doom"	Alan Burnett	September 7, 1985
After single-handedly capturing Superman's perennial nemesis Lex Luthor, the bionic Cyborg is invited to join the Justice League of America but surprisingly turns down the offer. Anxious to have someone his own age as a fellow Team member, the nuclear-powered Firestorm seeks out Cyborg to learn the reason for his reticence, but it will take the intervention of Darkseid and his Parademons, to say nothing of some horrific-looking sea pods, to make Cyborg change his mind. Cameos: Sarah Simms Note: From this point onwards, the show was retooled with a darker tone, a significantly different art style, and many previous notable characters with reduced roles.
87a	2a	"The Ghost Ship"	Antoni Zalewski	September 14, 1985
With Darkseid and his minions in hot pursuit, Superman, Firestorm and Cyborg temporarily take shelter in a huge derelict space vessel. It turns out that the three Galactic Guardians have boarded a ghost ship, controlled by a fugitive princess who uses hologram images to ward off pirates and to protect the people of her planet—who live in miniaturized form in a locket around her neck. Darkseid wants to exploit the princess, and to take sinister advantage of Superman's weakened state.
87b	2b	"The Bizarro Super Powers Team"	Glenn Leopold	September 14, 1985
Bizarro #1, the weird yet funny Superman doppelganger from Htrae (Bizarro World), uses his duplicator ray to create Bizarro versions of Wonder Woman, Firestorm and Cyborg. These "opposite clones" are then called upon to protect Bizarro World from its many enemies, but the prankish Mr. Mxyzptlk plans to harness the powers of the three Bizarro superheroes in order to wreak havoc upon the earth, in an endless series of nasty pranks and practical jokes specially designed to drive everyone as crazy as he is. The real Wonder Woman uses the duplicator ray on Mr. Mxyzptlk to create Mr. Kltpzyxm, causing the Bizarro Super Powers team to go back to Bizarro World and stop him, and making Mr. Mxyzptlk accidentally say his name backwards and go back to the 5th dimension.
88	3	"The Darkseid Deception"	Story by : Rich Fogel & Alan Burnett; Teleplay by : Rich Fogel	September 21, 1985
Little does Wonder Woman suspect that the man she assumes to be her mortal boyfriend Steve Trevor is actually the evil Darkseid, who has rearranged his molecular structure in order to impersonate Steve. It's all part of a master plan to steal the deadly TC7 satellite and transform everyone on earth into hideous mutants. The Galactic Guardians set out to rescue the real Steve and thwart Darkseid, a task made difficult when Wonder Woman herself is kidnapped.
89	4	"The Fear"	Alan Burnett	September 28, 1985
Gotham City is held in the grip of terror by Scarecrow's arsenal of Fear Transmitters. Scouring Gotham in search of Scarecrow, Batman is paralyzed with fright when he finds himself in the middle of Crime Alley, where his parents Thomas Wayne and Martha Wayne were murdered by Joe Chill years prior. Taking advantage of the situation, Scarecrow intends to keep Batman trapped in Crime Alley forever by using a captured Robin and Wonder Woman as bait, forcing the Caped Crusader to purge himself of his lifelong fears once and for all. Note: This is the first time that the origin of Batman is told in any other media outside the comics.
90	5	"The Wild Cards"	Story by : John Loy & Alan Burnett; Teleplay by : John Loy	October 5, 1985
There's a new supervillain in town and his name is The Ace. Gathering together a gang of four hardened thieves, the Ace decks them out in sinister playing-card costumes, and thus the Royal Flush Gang is born. In their efforts to defeat this scurrilous quintet of no-goods, Robin and Cyborg discover that the Ace is taking his orders directly from their perennial enemy Darkseid, while Batman learns to his astonishment that the Ace is not a "new" nemesis at all, but instead a very old one - the Joker. This was because their House of Cards lair lacks the joker card. Note: This is the only appearance of the Joker in any iteration of the series.
91a	6a	"Brainchild"	Donald F. Glut	October 12, 1985
While enjoying a day off with Firestorm, Cyborg is captured by the robot minions of supercomputer Brainiac, who intends to use the bionic dogooder for one of his typically evil "mind-blowing" experiments. To save the life of his fellow Galactic Guardian, Firestorm enlists the aid of Superman and rushes to Cyborg's rescue, but it may already be too late: the two superpowered good guys are confronted by a gigantic killer robot, with Cyborg's brain and intellect trapped inside its power source. Cameos: Green Lantern
91b	6b	"The Case of the Stolen Powers"	Mark Young	October 12, 1985
While languishing in prison with the Penguin as his cellmate, evil sorcerer Felix Faust conjures up a spell which enables him to steal the special powers of Superman. No sooner has this happened than the Penguin appropriates these powers for himself, and as result the Super Powers Team now works for him. In order to thwart the Penguin and emerge as the real villain of the piece, Faust absorbs all of Superman's powers, but Firestorm creates a kryptonite crown on Faust's head, weakening him and Wonder Woman uses her Magic Lasso to force him to give up Superman's powers and return them to the Man of Steel. Note: First appearance of Felix Faust and The Penguin. Curiously, Batman and Robin were not present to face Penguin. Aquaman, Hawkman, and Samurai make cameo appearances being bested by Penguin in the news footage.
92	7	"The Death of Superman"	Story by : Alan Burnett; Teleplay by : John Loy & Alan Burnett	October 19, 1985
The unthinkable has happened: Superman is dead, the victim of Kryptonite poisoning. Injured in the mishap which felled Superman, a weakened Firestorm is captured by Darkseid, who wants the Galactic Guardian to reveal the details of the Man of Steel's demise. Meanwhile, several members of the Super Powers Team gather at the Fortress of Solitude where they come across evidence indicating that Superman is still alive. Suspecting it to be true, they do not know why he allowed the other Team members to fall into Darkseid's clutches. Note: Green Lantern is featured in this episode, with appearances from Samurai, The Flash, and Hawkman. Cameos by Robin, Aquaman, and El Dorado.
93	8	"Escape from Space City"	Alan Burnett & Antoni Zalewski	October 26, 1985
Darkseid's latest project involves the capture and takeover of Star City, a gigantic orbiting colony of the Earth. To this end, he replaces the satellite's kidnapped inventor Mr. Moko with a robot lookalike that even fools Moko's daughter, Kiri. Meanwhile, Batman, Firestorm and Samurai must steer clear of Darkseid's minions Kalibak and DeSaad and their robot army, long enough to allow Superman, Wonder Woman and Aquaman to seek out and destroy the control equipment hidden in Darkseid's headquarters. Absent: Robin

== Home media ==
- On October 23, 2007, Warner Home Video (via DC Entertainment, Hanna-Barbera Productions and Warner Bros. Family Entertainment) released the complete series of The Super Powers Team: Galactic Guardians on DVD, containing all 10 episodes of the ninth and final Super Friends series was intended to be unedited and uncut, and presented in its original broadcast presentation and original airdate order, but one episode "The Bizarro Super Powers Team" is missing its title card on the DVD and "Escape From Star City" was the actual final episode (#8). On the DVD, "The Death of Superman" is mistakenly listed as episode #8 on disc 2, despite listed as episode #7 (the true number) on the DVD packaging. The author of The Ultimate Super Friends guide suggests that this should have been the final episode because it starred all the members of The Super Powers Team, despite broadcast as episode #7. In truth, the final episode "Escape From Star City" has the united team of the core founding members for the first and last time as Aquaman appears in an active role in this episode.

DVD name	Ep No.	Release date
The Complete Series	10	October 23, 2007

In addition, the episodes "The Death of Superman" and "The Seeds of Doom" were included on Warner's 25 Cartoon Collection: DC Comics, released on August 27, 2013. Those episodes were included on disc 2 of Warner's The Best of Superman, released on June 4 the same year.
