= Sarah Simms =

Publication information
- Publisher: DC Comics
- First appearance: The New Teen Titans #8 (June 1981)
- Created by: Marv Wolfman; George Pérez

In-story information
- Full name: Sarah Simms
- Supporting character of: Cyborg

Sarah Simms is a supporting character in the DC Universe and a romantic love interest of Cyborg.

== Fictional character biography ==
Vic Stone was brooding over how he cannot have a normal life. He has just been rejected by his girlfriend because of his disfiguring implants, and no one outside his teammates in the Teen Titans could stand being around him. However, Vic encounters Sarah Simms, a teacher at West Side School for the Handicapped who works with handicapped children. He bonds with one of the children, who has a plastic prosthetic arm and admires his own prosthetic body.

Vic and Sarah's friendship is shaken when Deathstroke kidnaps her in an attempt to get to the Titans. Vic feels responsible, and Sarah is upset by the event. Vic and Sarah later come to terms with the events and resume their close friendship.

Later, Sarah is accosted by her co-worker Mark Wright, who persistently claims to be her fiancé. After Mark takes a nearby store at gunpoint, Sarah calls for help, with Cyborg, Changeling, and Raven arriving and disarming Mark.

== In other media ==
- Sarah Simms appears in The Super Powers Team: Galactic Guardians episode "The Seeds of Doom", voiced by Arlene Golonka.
- A character based on Sarah Simms named Sarasim appears in the Teen Titans episode "Cyborg the Barbarian", voiced by Kimberly Brooks.
- Sarah Simms appears in Teen Titans Go!.
