= Khary Payton =

American actor (born 1972)

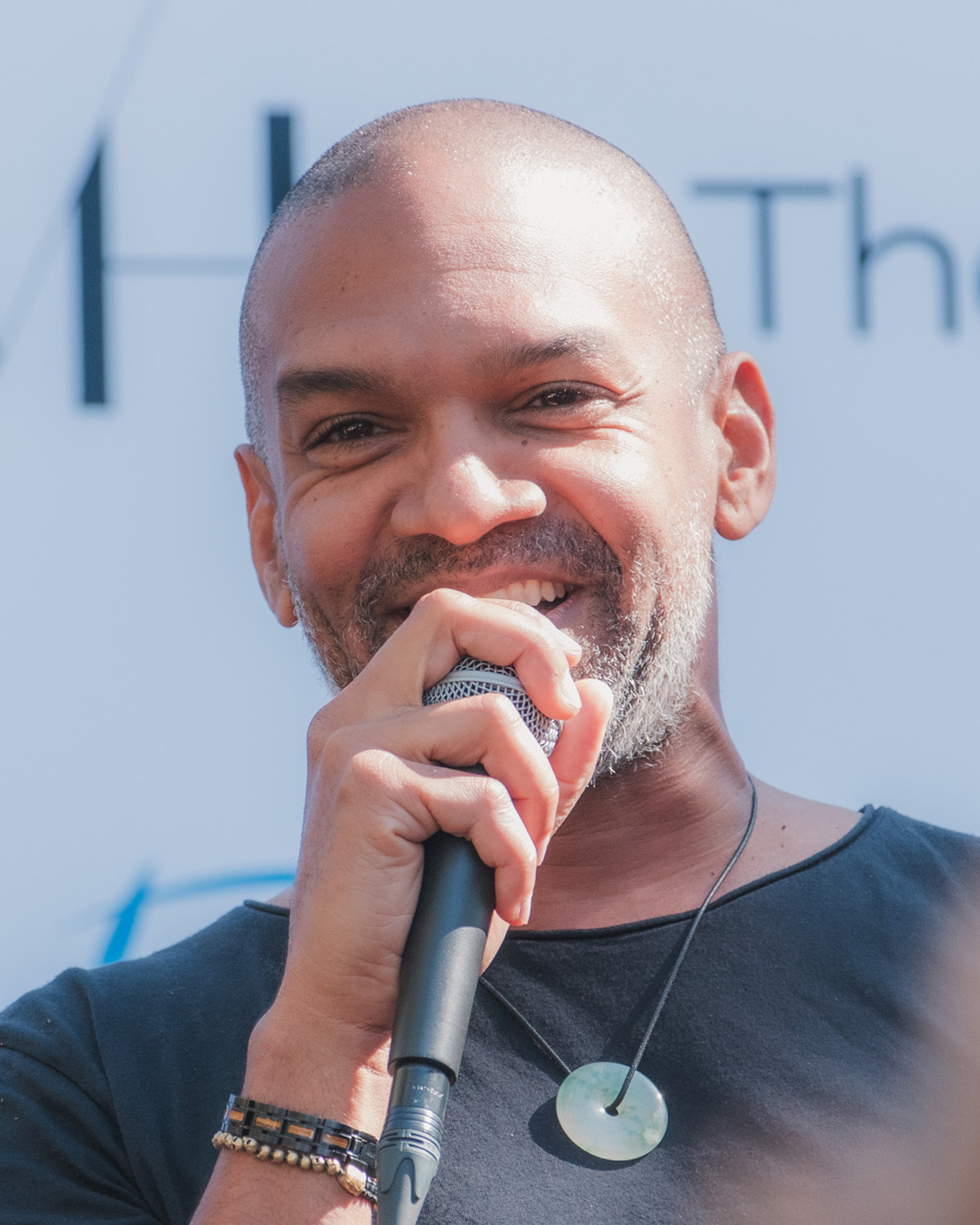
- Payton in 2025
- Born: May 16, 1972 (age 54); Augusta, Georgia, U.S.
- Occupation: Actor
- Years active: 2000–present
- Spouses: Linda Braddock (m. 2001; div. 2009) Stacy Reed (m. 2010; div. 2019) Tracy Swiatly (m. 2025)
- Children: 4

Khary Payton (born May 16, 1972) is an American actor. He is known for his roles as King Ezekiel on the AMC horror drama series The Walking Dead (2016–2022), as well as voicing Cyborg across various DC media and Kaldur'ahm / Aqualad in the animated series Young Justice (2010–2013; 2019–2022).

== Early life ==
Payton was born in Augusta, Georgia. At the age of 14, he won Showtime's first annual Kid Talent Quest, and a recording exists of him introducing an animated film called Sherlock Holmes in the Baskerville Curse broadcast on Showtime in September 1986.

== Career ==
=== Live-action work ===
Payton appeared on a recurring basis as Dr. Terrell Jackson on the ABC daytime soap opera General Hospital. He portrayed King Ezekiel on AMC's The Walking Dead.

=== Voice work ===
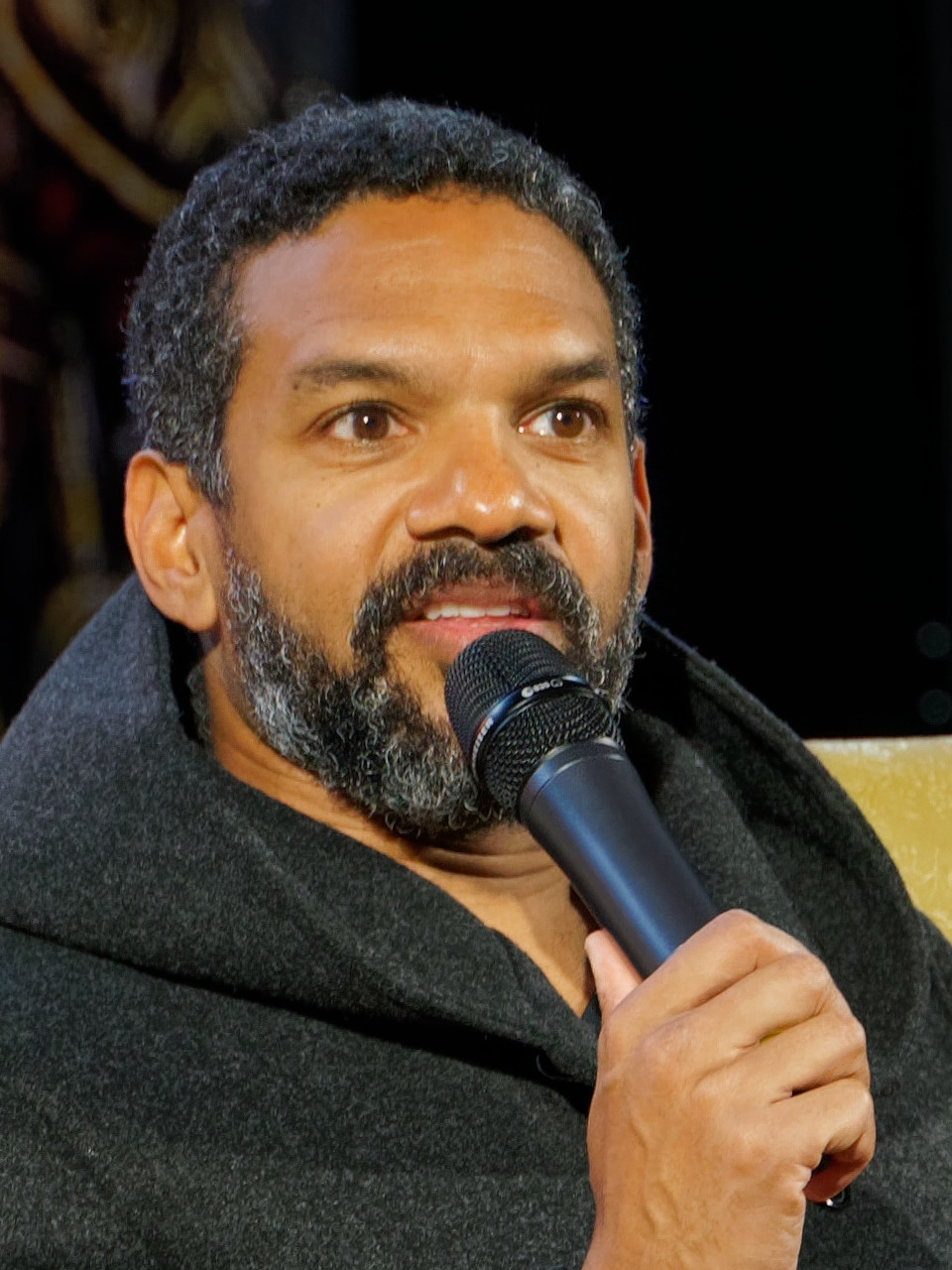
Payton in 2020

Payton has voiced Cyborg in both Teen Titans animated series and Aqualad in Young Justice, reprising his role in Teen Titans Go!. Payton has also voiced Cyborg and Doomsday in Injustice: Gods Among Us, as well as Cyborg and Grid in Injustice 2. In the animated series Justice League, Payton provided the voice of the villain Ten from the Royal Flush Gang. He also provided the voice of Drebin in the game Metal Gear Solid 4: Guns of the Patriots, Ripcord in G.I. Joe: Renegades, Blade in Marvel: Ultimate Alliance, Grimlock in Transformers: Robots in Disguise, Harold McBride in The Loud House (replacing Wayne Brady), Quinn Derringer in République, Killer Croc in Batman: Arkham Origins, Batman: Arkham Underworld, and Batman: Arkham Shadow, Wasabi in Big Hero 6: The Series and Kingdom Hearts III (replacing Damon Wayans Jr.) and the current voice of Rafiki in The Lion King franchise (replacing the late Robert Guillaume).

== Personal life ==
Payton has three children. He married Linda Braddock in 2001, and they divorced in 2009. He married Stacey Reed in 2010 and they filed for divorce in 2019. He has two children with Reed.

== Filmography ==
=== Voice over roles ===
==== Television ====
Year	Title	Role	Notes	Ref
2002	The Proud Family	Slapmaster	Episode: "The Altos"	
2003–2006	Teen Titans	Cyborg, Herald		
2003	Justice League	Ten	Episode: "Wild Cards"	
2004	The Shield	Lil Psych	Episode: "Cracking Ice"	
2004–2007	Codename: Kids Next Door	Maurice / Numbuh 9, additional voices	3 episodes	
2006	What's New, Scooby-Doo?	Mitch	Episode: "E-Scream"	
2006-2007	Ben 10	Hex, additional voices	7 episodes	
2006-2007	Loonatics Unleashed	General Deuce	3 episodes	
2007	Friday: The Animated Series	Craig Jones		
2007	Legion of Super-Heroes	Tyr, Hunter	2 episodes	
2008–2010	Ben 10: Alien Force	Manny, Hex	6 episodes	
2010	Generator Rex	Beasly, Gang Punk, Male Providence Cadet #2, Pilot	3 episodes	
2010–2011	G.I. Joe: Renegades	Ripcord, Wallace Weems, Guard #1, Lead Trooper	7 episodes	
2010–2013, 2019–2022	Young Justice	Aqualad / Doctor Fate, Brick, Black Manta, Black Lightning, Robotman, Silas Stone, additional voices		
2012	Ben 10: Ultimate Alien	Hex	Episode: "The Enemy of My Frenemy"	
2013–present	Teen Titans Go!	Cyborg, Zan, Couch, Universe Tree, Halloween Spirit, Young Justice Aqualad, Himself, various voices		
2014	Ben 10: Omniverse	Manny, Hex, Student	4 episodes	
2014	Lego DC Comics: Batman Be-Leaguered	Cyborg	TV special	
2015–2017	Transformers: Robots in Disguise	Grimlock, Bisk, Divebomb, additional voices		
2015	Fresh Beat Band of Spies	Rubberface Rudy, Teller #1	Episode: "Fake Fresh Beats"	
2015	Be Cool, Scooby-Doo!	Tony, Stan, Axel	2 episodes	
2015–2019	The Lion Guard	Rafiki, Muhangus	12 episodes	
2016	Sofia the First	Barley	Episode: "Bunny Swap"	
2016-2017	DC Super Hero Girls	Cyborg, Lion-Mane	5 episodes	
2016-2017	Justice League Action	Cyborg, Kanjar Ro	6 episodes	
2017–2021	Big Hero 6: The Series	Wasabi, additional voices		
2017	Guardians of the Galaxy	Jukka, Ship Crasher #2	2 episodes	
2017	Elena of Avalor	Captain Chiloya	Episode: "Party of a Lifetime"	
2019	Rapunzel's Tangled Adventure	Kai		
2021–present	Invincible	Black Samson, Kyle, additional voices		
2022–2023	The Legend of Vox Machina	Sovereign Uriel Tal'Dorei	6 episodes	
2022–present	The Loud House	Harold McBride, additional voices	3 episodes	
2024–2025	Hot Wheels Let's Race	Speedy Getaway		20 episodes
2024–2025	Krapopolis	Additional voices	Recurring role	

==== Film ====
Year	Title	Role	Notes	Source
2006	Teen Titans: Trouble in Tokyo	Cyborg	TV movie	
2011	The Legend of Awesomest Maximus	King Erotic	Comedy Film	
2012	Strange Frame: Love & Sax	Atem		
2012	Astronaut: The Last Push	Michael Forrest		
2013	Khumba	Dassies, Wild Dog	English dub	
2014	Batman: Assault on Arkham	Inmates, Henchmen	Direct-to-video	
2015	Justice League: Throne of Atlantis	John Henry Irons	Direct-to-video	
2015	Lego DC Comics Super Heroes: Justice League vs. Bizarro League	Cyborg, Cyzarro	Direct-to-video	
2015	Justice League: Gods and Monsters	John Henry Irons	Direct-to-video	
2015	Batman Unlimited: Monster Mayhem	Cyborg	Direct-to-video	
2015	Lego DC Comics Super Heroes: Justice League – Attack of the Legion of Doom	Cyborg, Cy-Bot	Direct-to-video	
2015	The Lion Guard: Return of the Roar	Rafiki		
2016	Lego DC Comics Super Heroes: Justice League – Cosmic Clash	Cyborg	Direct-to-video	
2016	Lego DC Comics Super Heroes: Justice League: Gotham City Breakout	Cyborg	Direct-to-video	
2016	DC Super Hero Girls: Hero of the Year	Cyborg	Direct-to-video	
2017	DC Super Hero Girls: Intergalactic Games	Cyborg, Lead	Direct-to-video	
2017	The Lion Guard: The Rise of Scar	Rafiki		
2018	Lego DC Comics Super Heroes: The Flash	Cyborg	Direct-to-video	
2018	Lego DC Super Hero Girls: Super-Villain High	Cyborg, Wizard Shazam	Direct-to-video	
2018	Teen Titans Go! To the Movies	Cyborg		
2018	Lego DC Comics Super Heroes: Aquaman – Rage of Atlantis	Cyborg	Direct-to-video	
2018	DC Super Hero Girls: Legends of Atlantis	Cyborg	Direct-to-video	
2019	Teen Titans Go! vs. Teen Titans	Cyborg	Direct-to-video	
2020	Bobbleheads: The Movie	Deuce	Direct-to-video	
2021	Teen Titans Go! See Space Jam	Cyborg	TV movie	
2022	Teen Titans Go! & DC Super Hero Girls: Mayhem in the Multiverse	Cyborg, Narrator	Direct-to-video	
2023	The Super Mario Bros. Movie	Penguin King		
2024	No Time to Spy: A Loud House Movie	Harold McBride		

==== Video games ====
Year	Title	Role	Notes	Source
2000	Deus Ex	Smuggler, JoJo Fine		
2004	Syphon Filter: The Omega Strain	Lawrence Mujari		
2004	The Chronicles of Riddick: Escape from Butcher Bay	Rael, Michaels		
2004	Men of Valor	Greaser, Random Marines		
2005	X-Men Legends II: Rise of Apocalypse	Bishop, Nick Fury		
2005	Quake 4	Bidwell		
2005	Tony Hawk's American Wasteland	Additional voices		
2006	Teen Titans	Cyborg		
2006	Reservoir Dogs	Mr. Blue		
2006	Saints Row	Additional voices		
2006	Marvel: Ultimate Alliance	Blade, Paibok		
2006	SOCOM U.S. Navy SEALs: Fireteam Bravo 2	WRAITH		
2006	Dead or Alive Xtreme 2	Zack		
2007	God of War II	Rhodes Soldiers, Spartan Soldiers		
2007	Spider-Man: Friend or Foe	Blade		
2008	Metal Gear Solid 4: Guns of the Patriots	Drebin 893	English dub	
2008	SOCOM U.S. Navy SEALs: Confrontation	Commando 3		
2008	Resistance 2	Warner		
2008	Tom Clancy's EndWar	Additional voices		
2009	FusionFall	Hex		
2009	Ninja Blade	Andy Walker		
2009	The Sims 3	Sim		
2009	Prototype	Additional voices		
2009	Cloudy with a Chance of Meatballs	Earl Deveraux		
2009	Marvel: Ultimate Alliance 2	Luke Cage, Blade		
2010	No More Heroes 2: Desperate Struggle	Nathan Copeland		
2010	SOCOM U.S. Navy SEALs: Fireteam Bravo 3	WRAITH		
2010	Dead or Alive Paradise	Zack		
2010	Ben 10 Alien Force: The Rise of Hex	Hex		
2010	Metal Gear Solid: Peace Walker	Soldiers, Extras	English dub	
2010	StarCraft II: Wings of Liberty	Additional voices		
2011	Killzone 3	Additional ISA voices		
2011	Dead or Alive: Dimensions	Zack		
2011	Infamous 2	Male Pedestrians		
2011	Spider-Man: Edge of Time	Additional voices		
2011	Ace Combat: Assault Horizon	Razor Co-Pilot		
2011	Batman: Arkham City	Azrael, Inmates		
2011	Star Wars: The Old Republic	Additional voices		
2012	Starhawk	Emmett Graves		
2012	PlayStation All-Stars Battle Royale	Emmett Graves		
2013	SimCity BuildIt	Additional voices		
2013	Aliens: Colonial Marines	Marine		
2013	Tomb Raider	Islanders		
2013	God of War: Ascension	Soldier, Slave		
2013	Injustice: Gods Among Us	Cyborg, Doomsday		
2013	Metro: Last Light	Additional voices		
2013	Fuse	Jacob Kimble		
2013	Marvel Heroes	Blade, War Machine		
2013	Batman: Arkham Origins	Killer Croc, Warden Joseph		
2013	Young Justice: Legacy	Aqualad, Black Manta		
2013	République	Quinn Derringer		
2014	Infamous Second Son	Additional voices		
2014	Infamous First Light	Additional voices		
2014	Call of Duty: Advanced Warfare	Lieutenant Knox	also motion capture	
2015	Infinite Crisis	Cyborg		
2015	Lego Dimensions	Cyborg (Teen Titans Go!)		
2015	Batman: Arkham Knight	Azrael		
2016	Mafia III	Additional voices		
2017	Injustice 2	Cyborg, Grid		
2019	Kingdom Hearts III	Wasabi	English dub	
2020	World of Warcraft: Shadowlands	Henry Garrick		
2023	Stray Gods: The Roleplaying Musical	Pan		
2024	Batman: Arkham Shadow	Otis Flannagan, Killer Croc		
2025	Dune Awakening	Raif Oslow, Dhood Shazz		
2026	Marvel 1943: Rise of Hydra	Azzuri / Black Panther		

=== Live action roles ===
==== Television ====
Year	Title	Role	Notes	Source
2001	Walker, Texas Ranger	Gillis	Episode: "Justice for All"	
2002	Imagine That	Demetrius	Episode: "The Married Balladeer"	
2003	JAG	Seaman James Westin	Episode: "Touchdown"	
2004	The Shield	Kaliel "Lil' Psych" Wilkes	Episode: "Cracking Ice"	
2006–2008	Emily's Reasons Why Not	Josh	6 episodes	
2006	Hannah Montana	Roger the Director	Episode: "More Than a Zombie to Me"	
2008	How I Met Your Mother	Guy #3 in Booth	Episode: "The Fight"	
2009	Medium	Mr. Bronson	Episode: "Baby Fever"	
2009	Criminal Minds	Det. Landon Kaminski	Episode: "Slave of Duty"	
2010	I'm in the Band	Director Kaz Ridley	Episode: "Spiders, Snakes and Clowns"	
2010	Lie to Me	Cpt. Stan Renshaw	Episode: "React to Contact"	
2010	CSI: Miami	Aaron Taber	Episode: "Manhunt"	
2011	General Hospital	Dr. Terrell Jackson	24 episodes	
2012	Fairly Legal	Tom Finnerman	Episode: "Kiss Me, Kate"	
2012	Go On	Don	Episode: "Pilot"	
2013	Body of Proof	Brad Carter	Episode: "Breakout"	
2016–2022	The Walking Dead	Ezekiel Sutton	Recurring (Season 7); Also starring (Season 8); Main cast (Seasons 9–11); 49 episodes	
2017	Hand of God	Major Tom	2 episodes	
2018	Critical Role	Shakäste	2 episodes	
2019	UnDeadwood	Aloysius Fogg	4 episodes	
2025	Watson	Miles McClung	Episode: "A Son in the Oven"	

==== Film ====
Year	Title	Role	Notes	Source
2003	Dracula II: Ascension	Kenny		
2004	Latter Days	Andrew		
2005	Hellraiser: Hellworld	Derrick		
2008	Ping Pong Playa	JP Money		
2009	Blood: The Last Vampire	Creature		
2011	The Legend of Awesomest Maximus	King Erotic		
2012	Astronaut: The Last Push	Michael Forrest	Also producer	

== Awards and nominations ==
Year	Award	Category	Work	Result
2014	BTVA Voice Acting Awards	Best Male Vocal Performance in a TV Series in a Guest Role - Action/Drama	Ben 10: Omniverse	Nominated
2015	BTVA Voice Acting Awards	Best Male Lead Vocal Performance in a TV Series	Transformers: Robots In Disguise	Nominated
2018	Saturn Awards	Best Supporting Actor on a Television Series	The Walking Dead	Nominated
2019	Saturn Awards	Best Supporting Actor on a Television Series	The Walking Dead	Nominated
