= Astronaut: The Last Push =

2012 American film

- Film poster
- Directed by: Eric Hayden
- Written by: Eric Hayden
- Starring: Lance Henriksen; Brian Baumgartner; Khary Payton
- Production company: TMA-1 Productions
- Distributed by: Amazing D.C.; HBO Polska; Lighthouse Home Entertainment; Vision Films
- Release dates: February 13, 2012 (Boston Science Fiction Film Festival); June 16, 2016
- Running time: 85 minutes
- Country: Canada
- Language: English

Astronaut: The Last Push (also known as The Last Push) is a 2012 American science fiction film directed by Eric Hayden in his feature directorial debut. It stars Khary Payton, in his first starring role, Lance Henriksen, and Brian Baumgartner.

When a catastrophic accident cuts the first crewed mission to Jupiter's moons short, Michael Forrest, the sole remaining astronaut, must endure the three year return trip alone.

== Plot ==
The film opens with a montage of footage which include greetings from Earth and an interview of the sponsor of the mission. Astronauts Nathan Miller and Michael Forrest are onboard Life One, a spacecraft built by Moffit Industries. They are supposed to be in hibernation for 6 years until they reach Europa, taking a route around Venus, sling-shotting around Earth to gain speed to get to Europa.

Midway through the first leg of their journey, Life One's proximity sensors sound; the ship is impacted and Michael Forrest is awakened. Michael escapes and seals the damaged hibernation and re-entry capsule with Nathan still inside. The habitation module Michael escapes to is leaking oxygen and is quickly repaired. Michael then makes contact with mission control. Aside from damage to the hibernation and re-entry capsule, along with engine control, the ship is intact.

Michael struggles to stay sane in the solitude while attempting to make repairs to Life One in order to fire the engines after swinging around Venus. Without the engines firing, Life One would stay in orbit around Venus. Mission control and Michael keep in regular contact, with Michael giving regular status reports on himself, and mission control giving encouragement and help in repairing the ship. Michael grows more frustrated over time as the repairs prove ineffective during engine tests. During one of the engine tests, the ship suffers a complete power failure. Michael desperately attempts to restore power but slowly loses hope as time progresses, the repairs fail to restore power, and the ship becomes cold. After a hallucination of his fellow astronaut jolts him awake, he makes one final effort to repair the ship which proves successful.

As the ship rounds Venus, Michael dons his space suit and re-enters the damaged hibernation capsule for the first time since the accident. He looks out of the window in awe at the sight of Venus' atmosphere below him. After passing Venus, he successfully ignites the engines and is two years away from Earth. On arriving at Earth he only has to reignite the engines to slow the ship down for a re-entry, but chooses not to. He instead chooses to slingshot past Earth per the original mission, and go to Europa, stating "Someone's supposed to go, Someone's supposed to see this". The film closes with him addressing Earth, as he ejects the hibernation capsule (along with Nathan) sending it to Earth, then reigniting the engines to take him to Europa.

== Cast ==
- Khary Payton as Michael Forrest
- Lance Henriksen as Walter Moffitt
- Brian Baumgartner as Bob Jansen
- James Madio as Nathan Miller
- Alec Gillis as Charlie
- Tom Woodruff Jr. a Control Technician
- Laurent Meurette as Mountain Biker 1
- Pascal Lamontagne as Mountain Biker 2

== Reception ==
Starburst Magazine said, "Director, Hayden, delivers some interesting moments and musings on human motivation, space exploration and one man’s psychological excursion but if you are a fan of this type of sci-fi you may have seen it all before." It gave the film a 6/10 rating.

== Awards ==
Payton won the "Best Actor Award" at the 2012 Independent Filmmakers Showcase.

== See also ==
- List of fictional space stations
