= Lego DC Comics Super Heroes: Justice League – Attack of the Legion of Doom =

- Blu-ray Cover
- Directed by: Rick Morales
- Screenplay by: Jim Krieg
- Starring: Troy Baker; Nolan North; Khary Payton
- Music by: Tim Kelly
- Production companies: Warner Bros. Animation; The Lego Group; DC Comics
- Distributed by: Warner Home Video
- Release date: August 25, 2015
- Running time: 72 minutes
- Country: United States
- Language: English

Lego DC Comics Super Heroes: Justice League – Attack of the Legion of Doom is a 2015 American animated superhero comedy film based on the Lego and DC Comics brands, which was released on August 25, 2015, on Blu-ray, DVD and Digital HD. This is the fourth Lego DC Comics film following Lego Batman: The Movie – DC Super Heroes Unite, Lego DC Comics Super Heroes: Batman Be-Leaguered, and Lego DC Comics Super Heroes: Justice League vs. Bizarro League.

Actors from various DC properties reprise their respective roles, including Mark Hamill as the Trickster, Nolan North as Superman, Khary Payton as Cyborg, John DiMaggio as The Joker, Josh Keaton as Green Lantern, Kevin Michael Richardson as Black Manta, Grey Griffin as Wonder Woman, and Tom Kenny as The Penguin. The film received generally positive reviews, with praise for the animation, action, and humor, although some criticized the consumerism in the film.

== Plot ==
Lex Luthor forms the Legion of Doom alongside Sinestro and Black Manta. Meanwhile, Batman wins an election to become the Justice League's leader.

The Legion of Doom hold auditions for membership using an obstacle course; the contestants consists of Joker, Man-Bat, Penguin, Cheetah, Captain Cold, Gorilla Grodd, Deathstroke, and Giganta. Of these contestants, only Gorilla Grodd, Cheetah, and Captain Cold join the team.

After triggering a stink bomb in a recent battle with Trickster, Cyborg begins to doubt his worth on the League. Later, the Justice League intercepts the Legion robbing Area 52. During the battle, Darkseid uses a Father Box to teleport Lex into a vault containing what he was after. The Legion escapes with a cell containing a specific alien prisoner. After opening it, the alien inmate is revealed to be a Martian named J'onn J'onnz who Lex plans to use against the League. He tells J'onn that the Legion are heroes and the League is evil.

Back at the Hall of Justice, Cyborg begins to question what he should do to be a better member. In the Hall of Justice, he notices J'onn disguised at Batman, creating a false mission alert about the Metropolis power station being in danger. When the League arrive at the power station, Cyborg sees that the station seems perfectly safe while the rest of the League can see the danger. This is because J'onn used his telepathy to make the fake mission alert look as real as possible as they evacuate Lois Lane and the workers alongside stopping other "problems" to the power plant. After the League launch the Nuketron reactor core into space, they immediately realize the only damage present is the damage they caused and the public turns against them for destroying the power station. The United Nations and General Sam Lane sentence the League to be banished into space.

This, however, turns out to be Lex's plan all along and the Legion then begin to divide which parts of the world they will control. This results in J'onn questioning the affiliation of the Legion. While disguised as Black Manta, he discovers that Lex plans to dispose of him once his usefulness expires. In space, Sinestro uses the Father Box to send the League to a black hole and Cyborg's robot assistant Cy-Bot is destroyed.

The real Cyborg is still in the Hall of Justice trying to find out why the League saw the power station in danger while he didn't. He soon finds the microchip J'onn used to hack the computer, but Sinestro finds and battles Cyborg. Just when it seems like Sinestro gained the upper hand, J'onn arrives and uses his telepathy to control him. J'onn explains how the Legion tricked him and how he tricked the League into turning themselves against the public and that his telepathy was ineffective on inorganic beings, explaining why it didn't work on Cyborg, whose brain was half-machine. J'onn sides with Cyborg and has Sinestro bring back the rest of the League.

As the Legion attacks the city, the League split up to battle them. The Legion is defeated and the League are cleared of all charges. J'onn apologizes for deceiving the League, but is quickly forgiven and offered League membership, which he accepts, taking the name Martian Manhunter.

Meanwhile, in prison, Lex tries to get Darkseid to break him out of prison. Darkseid refuses due to Lex's failure. As soon as he hangs up on Lex, Darkseid decides that if he wants to conquer the Earth, he will need help from an otherworldly being.

== Cast ==
- Khary Payton as Victor Stone / Cyborg, Cy-Bot
- Troy Baker as Bruce Wayne / Batman
- Dee Bradley Baker as J'onn J'onzz / John Jones / Martian Manhunter, Man-Bat
- John DiMaggio as Lex Luthor, Joker
- Grey Griffin as Diana Prince / Wonder Woman, Lois Lane
- Mark Hamill as Trickster, Sinestro
- Josh Keaton as Hal Jordan / Green Lantern
- Tom Kenny as Penguin
- Nolan North as Kal-El / Clark Kent / Superman
- Kevin Michael Richardson as Captain Cold, Gorilla Grodd, Black Manta
- Cree Summer as Cheetah
- James Arnold Taylor as Barry Allen / Flash, Sam Lane
- Tony Todd as Uxas / Darkseid

== Commercial performance ==
With DVD and Blu-ray sales combined, the film grossed $2.6 million.
