= Cyborg (DC Comics) =

DC Comics superhero

- Cyborg on the cover of Cyborg #1 (September 2015). Art by Ivan Reis.

Publication information
- Publisher: DC Comics
- First appearance: DC Comics Presents #26 (October 1980)
- Created by: Marv Wolfman; George Pérez

In-story information
- Full name: Victor Stone
- Species: Human (formerly); Cyborg (current)
- Place of origin: Detroit, Michigan
- Team affiliations: Titans; Teen Titans; Justice League
- Abilities: Genius-level intellect; Cybernetic enhancement grants: Superhuman strength, stamina, durability, and speed; Advanced sensor and weapon systems; Flight; Computer interfacing; Nano-regeneration; Shapeshifting; Portal creation via "Boom Tubes"

Altered in-story information for adaptations to other media
- Team affiliations: Doom Patrol

Cyborg is a superhero appearing in American comic books published by DC Comics. The character was created by writer Marv Wolfman and artist George Pérez, and first appeared in an insert preview in DC Comics Presents #26 (October 1980). Since his inception in the New Teen Titans relaunch in 1980, the character has been one of the most recurring roster members of the Teen Titans and in the 2010s, he was once reimagined as a founding member of the DC's flagship Justice League superhero lineup in lieu of his live actions adaptations, with these changes later removed from continuity.

The character's alter-ego is Victor Stone, an African-American genius whose athletic interests contrasts with his scientific parents. After suffering from a tragic accident that nearly kills him, he is rescued by his estranged father, who desperately used all of his knowledge to give cybernetic limbs in place of his lost ones and converted into a cyborg to save his life. While granted powers over technology and a superior body, Victor felt he lost much of his humanity and aspirations in the accident. Eventually, he embraced the lifestyle of a superhero and became one of Earth's foremost heroes, serving as a important member of the Teen Titans, Titans, and the Justice League.

Cyborg made his live-action debut in the television series Smallville, portrayed by Lee Thompson Young. Ray Fisher portrayed the character in the DC Extended Universe films Batman vs Superman: Dawn of Justice (2016), Justice League (2017), and Zack Snyder's Justice League (2021) while Joivan Wade portrayed Cyborg in the television series Doom Patrol and in the fourth season of Titans. In animated media, the character has made his debut in the animated series Super Friends. He has been voiced by Ernie Hudson, Khary Payton, Bumper Robinson, Shemar Moore, and Zeno Robinson.

== Development ==
In an interview, Pérez described his design approach for the character. "In the case of Cyborg I was inspired visually -and I think it is obvious from the head- by Deathlok... then I decided to make him more robotic than android by making more metallic parts of him, so that he wasn't quite as human... but the half-face metallic plate was obviously inspired by Deathlok by Rich Buckler, and then I used a young Jim Brown as my inspiration for how I would handle the body language for the character."

== Character biography ==
Victor Stone as Cyborg, as he appeared in The New Teen Titans comic book series in the 1980s. Art by George Pérez.

Victor Stone is the son of Silas Stone and Elinore Stone, scientists who use him as a test subject for various intelligence enhancement projects. While these treatments are ultimately successful and Victor's IQ subsequently grows to genius levels, he grows to resent his treatment.

Victor strikes up a friendship with Ron Evers, a young miscreant who leads him into trouble with the law. This is the beginning of a struggle in which Victor strives for independence, engaging in pursuits of which his parents disapprove, such as athletics and abandoning his studies. Victor's association with underage criminals leads him down a dark path where he is often injured, but he still lives a "normal" life and is able to make his own decisions. However, this rebellious path does not bury Victor's conscience considering that he refuses to participate in Evers' grandiose plans of racially motivated terrorism.

Victor's situation changes radically when he visits his parents' lab where experiments in inter-dimensional access are done. At that moment of his entry, an aggressive gelatinous creature was accidentally pulled through and Victor's mother is killed by it. It then turned on Victor and he was severely injured by its attack before his father was able to send it back to its native dimension.

With his wife dead and his son mutilated, unconscious and near death from the incident, Silas is driven to take advantage of his prototype medical prosthetic research to treat Victor. Victor only regains consciousness after the extensive artificial limbs and implants were installed in his body without his consent. Victor was horrified at the discovery of the metallic components, which involve most of the left side of his head and face, and raged that he would rather have died than be such a victim of his father's manipulations.

Although his bitterness remained for some time, Victor eventually calmed down enough to successfully adjust to his implants physically. He found himself rejected by the public because of his implants, including his girlfriend, who would later thoughtlessly blurt out that she would prefer he had died instead of being in that state. However, Victor's conscience was unbowed, as evidenced by the fact that when Evers tried to manipulate him into participating in a terrorist attack on the United Nations, Victor decided to equip himself with his weaponized attachments and stop him on the top of United Nations Headquarters.

=== Teen Titans ===
When Robin assembles the Teen Titans, Victor joins initially for the benefit of a support group of kindred spirits and freaks, and has remained with that group ever since. Fortunately, Victor eventually finds additional new civilian friends such as a group of juveniles who are adjusting to their own prosthetics and idolize him because of his fancy parts and his exciting adventures. It also turns out that their teacher Sarah Simms, who has often assisted Cyborg and the Titans, admires him as well.

Another person who sees past the cybernetic shell is Dr. Sarah Charles, a S.T.A.R. Labs scientist who helps him to recuperate after having his cybernetic parts replaced. Cyborg and Charles date for some time and she, along with Changeling, keeps trying to reach him when he is seemingly mindless following the severe injuries he incurs during the "Titans Hunt" storyline.

=== Deaths and rebirths ===
Victor Stone – as Cyberion – is reunited with Sarah Charles.

Although Cyborg's body was repaired by a team of Russian scientists after the missile crash he had been in, albeit with more mechanical parts than previously, his mind was not. Eventually, his mind was restored by an alien race of computer intelligences called the Technis, created from the sexual union of Swamp Thing and a machine-planet when Swamp Thing was travelling through space. Cyborg, however, had to remain with the Technis both to maintain his mind and because, in return for restoring him, he had to teach them about humanity. He took the name Cyberion, and gradually started becoming less human in outlook, connecting entirely to the Technis planet.

Eventually, Cyberion returned to Earth, establishing a Technis construct on the moon and a smaller base on Earth. With Victor's consciousness dormant, but his desire for companionship controlling the actions of the Technis' planet, it began kidnapping former Titans members, his conscious mind so suppressed that he was not only searching for deceased Titans, but even sent one probe looking for himself as Cyborg. He ended up plugging them into virtual reality scenarios, representing what he believed to be their "perfect worlds". Although the Titans were freed, there was a strong disagreement between them and the Justice League over what action to take; the League believed that there was nothing left of Victor to save, whereas the Titans were willing to try, culminating in a brief battle, where the Atom and Catwoman (who had followed the Justice League to investigate) sided with the League while the Flash fought with the Titans, until the two were convinced to work together after Batman and Nightwing found the system containing Victor's core consciousness. While Victor was distracted trying to aid his friends, a Titans team consisting of Changeling and the original five Titans were sent by Raven to try making contact with Victor's human side, while Superman, Wonder Woman, Green Lantern, Martian Manhunter, Power Girl, Captain Marvel, and Mary Marvel moved the moon back to its proper place. Eventually, thanks primarily to Changeling's encouragement, and Omen and Raven holding Victor together long enough to come up with a plan, Victor's consciousness was restored, and "downloaded" into the Omegadrome, a morphing war-suit belonging to former Titan Minion. In the wake of this event, the Titans reformed and Victor was part of the new group. However, he felt less human than ever before.

Shortly after this, Nightwing revealed he had cloned Victor's body, and by flowing the Omegadrome through the clone, Victor regained his human form, but still had the abilities of the Omegadrome. He often used the Omegadrome to recreate his original look in battle. With his newfound humanity, Victor took a leave of absence, moving first to Los Angeles with Beast Boy and then to Central City. While in Central City, Victor was involved in one of the Thinker's schemes, helping Wally hack the Thinker's attempt to plug himself into the minds of Central City's population so that Wally could outthink his opponent, though Victor lost the abilities of the Omegadrome in the process.

=== Mentor ===
Victor mentored the new incarnation of the Teen Titans, consisting mainly of sidekicks, most of whom have taken over the identities of former members (i.e. Tim Drake, the third Robin, instead of Dick Grayson, the original Robin and Titans leader), as well as stalwarts such as Starfire, Raven, and Beast Boy. They have fought enemies such as Deathstroke, Brother Blood, Doctor Light, the Titans Tomorrow, and a brainwashed Superboy and Indigo during a team up with the Outsiders in the Insiders storyline. Cyborg was the only one capable of standing up to Light thanks to his solar shields, though he makes it clear that he only won the fight because the rest of the Titans had softened Light up first.

=== "Infinite Crisis" and beyond ===
During the 2005–2006 storyline Infinite Crisis, Cyborg joined Donna's "New Cronus" team that went to investigate a hole in the universe that was found during the Rann-Thanagar War. He left Beast Boy in charge of the Titans while he was gone. They arrived at the reset center of the universe and with the help of assorted heroes aided in the defeat of Alexander Luthor, who was attempting to recreate the multiverse and build a perfect Earth from it. After returning to Earth, Cyborg is temporarily fused with Firestorm due to Luthor altering the Zeta Beams the heroes were using to return home.

After being severely damaged during Infinite Crisis, Cyborg was rebuilt over time in thanks to Tower caretakers Wendy and Marvin. He awoke a year later to find a different Teen Titans being led by Robin, the only member from the team he formed prior to going into space. He is still a member of the team, but feels that Kid Devil and Ravager are hardly worthy Titans, and thus is attempting to find a way to reform "the real Titans".

After the team along with the Doom Patrol defeated the Brotherhood of Evil, Cyborg asked Beast Boy to rejoin the Titans, but Gar refused, saying that his skills were needed with the Doom Patrol. After returning to Titans Tower, Cyborg began reviewing the security tapes during the last year, in which it appears that he was looked to by all the Titans of the past year for a shoulder to lean on, despite being in a coma-like state.

It appears that although Cyborg has returned to the team, the role of leader is now in the hands of Robin. He does however retain the position of statesman amongst the team and occasionally plays second-in-command.

In Justice League of America (vol. 2) #3, Batman, Wonder Woman, and Superman agree that Cyborg should be offered membership in the new Justice League. However, following a battle against Amazo, Green Lantern and Black Canary take over the formation of the JLA, and Cyborg is not amongst the roster.

In the Teen Titans East one-shot, Cyborg gathers a new team of Titans. During a training exercise, the group is attacked by Trigon, and Cyborg was blasted with a giant energy beam. He is last seen in a crater, with only his head and torso remaining.

=== Titans ===
In the aftermath of Trigon's assault in the Titans East one shot, Cyborg is placed into a special hoverchair while he recuperates. Cyborg's body is completely repaired in Titans (vol. 2) #5. Soon after, Jericho possesses Cyborg, using him to manipulate the defenses at Titans Tower to kill the Teen Titans. Jericho's plans are foiled when Static, the newest Teen Titan, uses his electrical powers to overload the Tower's systems, causing feedback that knocks Jericho out of Cyborg. Cyborg pretends to still have Jericho inside of him to draw out Vigilante, who is currently targeting Jericho. Vigilante appears and shoots Cyborg in the head.

=== 2008 miniseries ===
In an unspecified time during the Teen Titans comics, a man with enhancements similar to Cyborg's attacks Sarah Charles on the day of her wedding to Deshaun, a young scientist. Cyborg rushes in for the save, discovering how Deshaun, connected to Project M, has sold the technology used to turn Stone into Cyborg to the military. He also finds that the enhanced man was Ron Evers, once Victor's best friend now turned terrorist, who was seeking vengeance for the soldiers used as test subjects. After Cyborg manages to calm down his friend and discovers the truth: Elias Orr, revealed as the mastermind behind Project M's cyborg research, brings his Stone-derived best subjects: Equus, an armored form of the Wildebeest; and a cyberized man sporting enhancements even more powerful than Stone's current ones called Cyborg 2.0.

Cyborg 2.0 turns out to be the Titans Tomorrow Cyborg 2.0, snatched from his proper timeline and cajoled by Orr into fighting his younger self for the possession of their shared technology and Orr's permission to use it in the battlefield. Cyborg is soon forced to fight simultaneously against the Phantom Limbs, an elite force of soldiers crippled in the Middle East and restored by his tech, and the Cyborg Revenge Squad, a broader formation composed of the Fearsome Five, Magenta, Girder, the Thinker, and Cyborgirl. Although the Cyborg Revenge Squad soon gains the upper hand, with the help of his fellow Titans Cyborg is able to hold his own in combat, reverse engineer on the fly some of the future technology used by Cyborg 2.0, and enhance his own body enough to win against Orr. He later decides to get a new lease in life, forgiving Deshaun and Sarah Charles on their wedding day for abusing his technology, resuming dating Sarah Simms and having the Phantom Limbs fitted with new, non-military, prosthetics. It is however implied the Phantom Limbs, unwilling to see Stone's offer as a sign of good will, are trying to get back their weaponized prosthetics and wait for a rematch.

=== Blackest Night and JLA ===
In Blackest Night, Cyborg joins with Starfire, Beast Boy, and several other heroes to form an emergency team to fight off the army of dead Titans who have been reanimated as Black Lanterns. He later joins in the final battle at Coast City.

Following the dissolution of the current JLA after Justice League: Cry for Justice, Cyborg is invited by Donna to join Kimiyo Hoshi's new Justice League. He befriends Red Tornado, and claims that he has come up with a plan to make him indestructible.

After a battle with Doctor Impossible's gang, Cyborg is forced to take a leave of absence from the team to not only help rebuild Red Tornado, but also help Roy Harper, who had his arm severed by Prometheus. During this time, Victor leads Superboy and Kid Flash to Dakota City to rescue the Teen Titans, who had been defeated and captured by Holocaust. The Titans emerge victorious from the battle after Kid Flash uses his powers to send Holocaust plummeting into the Earth's core.

Despite apparently being written off the team, writer James Robinson explained that Cyborg would continue to have a presence on the JLA, and that he was given a co-feature in the back of the book for Justice League of America (vol. 2) #48–50. In the co-feature, Cyborg battles Red Tornado after he has been driven insane by the power of Alan Scott's Starheart. In the midst of the battle, a flashback reveals that Victor had rebuilt Red Tornado using self-replicating nanites similar to the ones that Prometheus infected Roy with after cutting off his arm, thus making the android indestructible. Cyborg manages to free Red Tornado from his power matrix.

Following an adventure in another dimension, Static is left powerless and Miss Martian is rendered comatose. Cyborg stops the powerless Static from returning to Dakota, and instead tells him that he and scientist Rochelle Barnes will be taking him to Project Cadmus to find a way to get his powers back and awaken Miss Martian. As Static packs up his belongings, Cyborg and Rochelle have a conversation which reveals that they are lying to Static and have an ulterior motive for taking the two Titans to Cadmus.

Cyborg and Red Tornado later travel to the Moon alongside Doctor Light, Animal Man, Congorilla, Zauriel, Tasmanian Devil and Bulleteer as part of an emergency group of heroes gathered to assist the Justice League in their battle against Eclipso. Shortly into the battle, Cyborg and the others are taken over by Eclipso and are turned against their JLA comrades. The reserve JLA members are all freed after Eclipso is defeated.

=== The New 52 ===
The redesigned Cyborg as a member of the original Justice League. Art by Ivan Reis.

As of August 2011, Cyborg is featured as one of the main characters in a new Justice League ongoing series written by Geoff Johns and drawn by Jim Lee as part of DC's The New 52 relaunch. Johns has said of Cyborg, "He represents all of us in a lot of ways. If we have a cellphone and we're texting on it, we are a cyborg—that's what a cyborg is, using technology as an extension of ourselves."

In a revised origin, Victor Stone is a high school football star who is heavily sought after by scouts, but has a distant relationship with his father Silas, a S.T.A.R. Labs scientist. Victor appears at his father's Lab as Silas' team is studying a Mother Box that Superman brought them. After a heated argument about Silas not attending Victor's games even after hearing about his son's success, the Mother Box explodes. The explosion kills the other scientists and destroys most of Victor's body, but spares Silas. Silas uses an injection of experimental nanites to save Victor, with T. O. Morrow adding robotic pieces onto Victor to assist. Victor becomes a cyborg and is imbued with the Mother Box's energy, allowing him to access the data library of the New Gods. Victor is getting used to his new body when Parademons attack, attempting to grab Charles. Cyborg's defense systems react, and he quickly dispatches the Parademons while also destroying part of the lab. Victor blames Silas for his condition after hearing his father out and leaves. Later on after attempting to help a few civilians under attack, Victor inadvertently absorbs some of the attacking Parademon's components giving him access to Boom Tube technology. Victor reverse-engineers the Boom Tube to teleport Darkseid and his forces away from Earth.

When the Crime Syndicate arrives on Prime Earth, Cyborg's old prosthetic parts combine to form a robot called Grid, who is operated by a sentient computer virus. During the Forever Evil event, after Batman and Catwoman drop Cyborg off to his father in Detroit, he willingly receives a new cybernetic body and helps his father and Morrow create one that is slimmer in appearance so that he can appear more human. Working together with the Metal Men, Cyborg succeeds in shutting down Grid.

Afterward, Cyborg helped newcomer to the group Shazam fit in with the league as the rest set out to find Power Ring's missing ring, which flew off after the death of the former wearer. Eventually the call goes out and everyone in the league mobilizes to secure the new rampaging Power Ring before the Doom Patrol does. After coaxing Shazam into action against Jessica Cruz, Victor moves in to interface with the ring itself, finding out a great deal about the ring of Volthoom and his current host, only to be forcefully thrown out after the ring entity rejects him.

Batman temporarily incapacitates Cyborg and places him in a VR simulation, allowing Batgirl to use his Mother Box to secure a path towards Apokolips. Cyborg snaps out of his trance and follows Batman, angered at being used. Cyborg travels to Apokolips and attempts to set off a timed self-destruct sequence within the Apokoliptian computers, but suffers catastrophic feedback that fries most of his internal systems. Cyborg repairs his systems and gains control over the still-open Boom Tube as Batman readies the Batplane. As Batman rams his jet into Kalibak sending him careening back to Apokolips, Cyborg closes the portal, banishing Kalibak.

An eponymous ongoing series, by writer David F. Walker and artist Ivan Reis, debuted in July 2015.

=== DC Rebirth ===
As of DC Rebirth, he is a part of the relaunched Justice League bi-monthly series as well as his own solo monthly series.

During Dark Nights: Metal, he is captured by the alternate Batmen of the Dark Multiverse, who attempt to hack him to learn the secrets of his teammates. As the crisis escalates, Cyborg is confronted by the controlling consciousness of other Mother Boxes, who claim that he will only gain the power to overcome the Dark Batmen if he fully surrenders to the Mother Box that powers his body at the cost of the transformation deleting his old personality. He is nearly tempted to give in to this transformation, but the appearance of Raven's soul-self convinces him to hold on to himself while partially succumbing to the transformation. This allows him to free his teammates and 'hack' the multiverse as they travel to find new allies in the battle against the Dark Batmen.

=== New Justice ===
In the New Justice era, Cyborg remains a prominent member in Justice League's fourth volume, as well as the four-issue Justice League: No Justice miniseries, and the succeeding 25-issue title Justice League Odyssey. The titles and story arcs of this era primarily revolve around Cyborg fighting alongside his usual teammates (and occasionally several villains) to survive uncovered secrets of the multiverse and the Source Wall.

In the succeeding Justice League Odyssey title, Cyborg joins forces with Starfire, Jessica Cruz, and Azrael to explore previously unaffected areas of outer space. The team finds themselves being led into the newly-established "Ghost Sector" by Darkseid, who seeks to use the power of the Old Gods to conquer the multiverse.

In addition, Cyborg's own solo monthly series was concluded in June 2018 with the release of Issue 23.

=== Infinite Frontier ===
As of Infinite Frontier, Cyborg is a part of Titans Academy. In this monthly title, the Titans are now mentors to the newest generation of heroes.

=== Dawn of DC (2023–present) ===
In "Dawn of DC", Cyborg received a six-issue miniseries, written by Morgan Hampton and drawn by Tom Raney. He is also part of the Titans who have replaced the Justice League following their death and return in Dark Crisis. After returning to Detroit, Victor battles an aggressive artificial intelligence attempting to transform the city.

The series New History of the DC Universe clarifies that Cyborg's New 52 origin story remains intact, including teaming up with other future members of the Justice League to defeat Darkseid. However, Cyborg went into recuperative care shortly afterwards, and the Justice League did not come into existence officially until a subsequent alien invasion.

== Powers and abilities ==
Large portions of Victor Stone's body have been replaced by advanced mechanical parts (hence the name Cyborg) granting him superhuman strength, speed, stamina, and flight. His mechanically-enhanced body, much of which is metallic (initially Promethium mainly "depleted" Promethium made of titanium and vanadium), is far more durable than a normal human body. Cyborg's internal computer system can interface with external computers. Other features include an electronic "eye" which replicates vision but at a superhuman level. His mechanical parts contain a wide variety of tools and weapons, such as a grappling hook/line and a finger-mounted laser. His most frequently-used weapon is his sound amplifier, which can be employed at various settings either to stun his foes or to deliver concentrated blasts of sound potent enough to shatter rock and deform steel.

Cyborg is consistently depicted as making adjustments to his cybernetic parts, enhancing his functions and abilities to levels beyond those set by his father. This change has allowed writers to adjust his powers as needed for various stories. Following DC's New 52 reboot in 2011, Cyborg's origin story was changed so that his enhancements were the product of alien technology, specifically that of a Mother Box from the planet New Genesis. His cybernetics are now seen as a living extension of his body, and a host of new skills such as EMP blasts, technology absorption, and underwater adaptation were added to his powerset. Most significantly, he was given the ability to generate boom tubes — powerful teleportation tunnels used by the New Gods to travel vast distances — due to this Mother Box connection. Elements of Victor's original backstory were re-established following DC's Trinity War storyline when his father rebuilds systems following extensive damage to them.

In addition to his mechanical enhancements, Victor possesses an "exceptionally gifted" level of intelligence; his IQ has been measured at 170.

== Other versions ==
Many alternate universe versions of Cyborg have appeared throughout the character's publication history.

- In Kingdom Come, Cyborg's body is made of liquid metal and he is now known as Robotman. Robotman serves as a member of Superman's Justice League until Batman kills him.
- Cyborg appears in Titans Tomorrow as a member of Titans East.
- In DCeased, Darkseid inadvertently created a deadly techno-organic virus that turns victims into zombie-like beings after attempting to use Cyborg to access the Anti-Life Equation.
- In Teen Titans: Earth One, Cyborg was given powers as part of S.T.A.R. Labs' experiments, led by his mother Elinore, during which he was bonded with alien metal.

== Supporting cast ==
Within his various comic book series, Cyborg has had a supporting cast; the most reoccurring is his father, Silas Stone, a leading S.T.A.R Labs scientist whom he has a estranged relationship with until his death. Sarah Charles, a S.T.A.R Labs scientist under Silas, serves as a recurring ally and occasional love interest. Elinore Stone, Cyborg's mother, often appears posthumously as the more supportive parent for his athletic aspirations and the origin point for his "booyah" catchphrase. The 2023 limited series introduced Estelle and Max Greene; Estelle is the host of "Do Better Detroit" and is seemingly critical of Cyborg's heroic exploits. Max is Estelle's younger relative who is a super-fan of Cyborg who follows his riskier exploits. Cyborg also works with therapist Doctor Sutton, who aids him in dealing with family trauma.

=== Enemies ===
Cyborg has several adversaries; Ron Evers was Cyborg's childhood best friend-turned enemy who was granted the same technological implants following injuries substained when Victor chose saving lives over him by and sought revenge for his role in his transformation and impersonated his identitiy. Elias Orr, a mercenary and black ops specialist in cybernetics, is the architect of the elite military unit known as Phantom Limbs, wounded soldiers granted technological limbs derived of the same technology as Cybrg on the condition of service. Orr is also responsible for Ron's brief membership in the unit. Inspired by his animated appearance, A.T.L.A.S. (Automated Titanium Lethal Attack Sentry) debuted as a prominent adversary who challenges Cyborg's physical prowess. A.T.L.A.S is noted to be petty and lacks a strong motive other than to best Cyborg and prove his superiority.

Character	First appearance
A.T.L.A.S.	Cyborg (2023) #3 (November 2023)
Brother Blood	The New Teen Titans #21 (July 1982)
Darkseid	Superman's Pal Jimmy Olsen #134 (December 1970)
Deathstroke	The New Teen Titans #2 (December 1980)
Fearsome Five	The New Teen Titans #3 (January 1981)
Grid	Justice League (2011) #23 (October 2013)
Livewire	Superman: The Animated Series "Livewire"
Elias Orr	Superman (1987) #202 (April 2004)
Ron Evers	Tales of the New Teen Titans #1 (June 1982)
Solace	Cyborg (2023) #3 (November 2023)
Teams
Fearsome Five	New Teen Titans #3 (January 1981)
Phantom Limbs	DC Special: Cyborg #5 (September 2008)

== Collected editions ==
#	Title	Material collected	Pages	Publication date	ISBN
	Teen Titans Spotlight: Cyborg	DC Special: Cyborg #1–6	144	March 18, 2009	978-1401221409
The New 52
1	Unplugged	Cyborg (vol. 1) #1–6, and material from Convergence: Crime Syndicate #2	152	March 29, 2016	978-1401261191
2	Enemy of the State	Cyborg (vol. 1) #7–12, Cyborg: Rebirth #1	168	December 6, 2016	978-1401265311
DC Rebirth
1	The Imitation of Life	Cyborg (vol. 2) #1–5, Cyborg: Rebirth #1	152	March 28, 2017	978-1401267926
2	Danger in Detroit	Cyborg (vol. 2) #6–13	144	August 15, 2017	978-1401270872
3	Singularity	Cyborg (vol. 2) #14–20	168	May 15, 2018	978-1401274559
4		Cyborg (vol. 2) #21–26	Solicited, then cancelled		978-1401285135
Dawn of DC
	Homecoming	Cyborg (vol. 3) #1–6	144	April 2, 2024	978-1779524843

== Reception and legacy ==
The character of Cyborg has been described as a hero who is both Black and disabled, and has been called "an exceptional figure in a genre replete with wonders." His appearance has also been analyzed in the context of visual design and Black superheroes.

== In other media ==
=== Television ===
==== Live-action ====
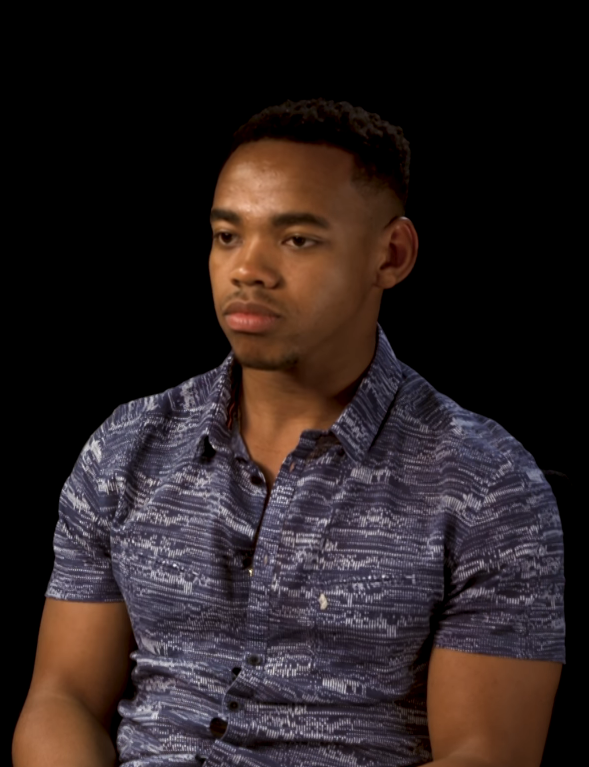
Joivan Wade portrays Cyborg in Doom Patrol.

- Cyborg appears in Smallville, portrayed by Lee Thompson Young. This version is a former Metropolis High School football player who was presumed dead in a car accident, but was secretly rebuilt by SynTechnics scientists led by Dr. Alistair Krieg with "bionic" endoskeletal cybernetic enhancements. After becoming the only survivor of Krieg's experiments, Stone escaped before LuthorCorp bought out SynTechnics. In his most notable appearance in the episode "Justice", Stone takes the name Cyborg, receives further enhancements from Green Arrow, and joins him, among others, to combat Lex Luthor.
- Cyborg appears in Doom Patrol, portrayed by Joivan Wade. This version is a former high school football player from Detroit who was injured after accidentally causing a lab explosion that also killed his mother Elinore and subsequently transformed and rebuilt by his father Silas Stone. Cyborg would later help the eponymous Doom Patrol until they eventually disband, after which he becomes a robotics professor.
- Cyborg appears in Titans, portrayed again by Joivan Wade.

==== Animation ====
Cyborg as he appears in the Teen Titans animated series

Cyborg as depicted in Teen Titans Go!

- Cyborg appears in The Super Powers Team: Galactic Guardians, voiced by Ernie Hudson. This version is an associate of the Justice League who was previously a promising decathlon athlete until an accident destroyed most of his body and his father rebuilt him using machine parts.
- When Justice League was pitched to the Kids' WB network, the lineup originally included, among others, an original character described as a teenage female version of Cyborg named Natasha Irons / Cyborgirl as a protégé of the Justice League.
- Cyborg appears in Teen Titans (2003), voiced by Khary Payton. This version is more easygoing than his comics counterpart, possesses an enormous appetite, and displays excess pride for his inventions. Additionally, he was unable to finish high school due to the circumstances that turned him into Cyborg, primarily wields sonic cannons housed in his forearms, and serves as the Teen Titans' chief technician and occasional second-in-command to Robin.
- Cyborg appears in DC Super Friends (2010), voiced by Phil LaMarr.
- Cyborg appears in Mad, voiced by Hugh Davidson in the segment "DolPhineas and Ferb Tale" and Gary Anthony Williams in the segment "Teen Titanic".
- Cyborg appears in DC Nation Shorts, voiced again by Khary Payton in the "New Teen Titans" segment and by Kevin Michael Richardson in the short "Lightning Round".
- Cyborg appears in Teen Titans Go! (2013), voiced again by Khary Payton. This version is a member of the Teen Titans who is uncertain about his half-mechanical nature, knowledgeable in 1980s culture, and in a relationship with Jinx. Additionally, the Teen Titans (2003) incarnation of Cyborg appears in the episode "The Academy" via archival footage.
- Cyborg appears in the Robot Chicken DC Comics Special, voiced by Abraham Benrubi.
- Cyborg appears in Robot Chicken DC Comics Special 2: Villains in Paradise, voiced by Seth Green.
- Cyborg makes a non-speaking appearance in Robot Chicken DC Comics Special III: Magical Friendship.
- Cyborg appears in DC Super Friends (2015), voiced by Bryton James.
- Cyborg appears in Justice League Action, voiced again by Khary Payton. This version is a member of the Justice League.
- Cyborg appears in Young Justice, voiced by Zeno Robinson. This version was a receiver for Hayward High School's football team, the Steel Workers, who wants his father Silas Stone to attend his football games. When the latter fails to appear due to being busy with his work at S.T.A.R. Labs, an angered Victor confronts Silas, believing his father cares more about his work than his family. Amidst their argument, Victor accidentally activates a Reach metahuman failsafe device, causing an explosion that grievously injures him. In desperation, Silas fuses Victor with a Father Box the Justice League asked him to study to save his life. Subsequently, Victor blames Silas for ruining his life and is inadvertently controlled by the Father Box until Halo temporarily restores his mind, after which he joins the Team. Over the course of the season, he fights to maintain control of his body until Superboy, Black Lightning, and Forager remove the Father Box's programming using Metron's Mobius Chair, reconciles with Silas, helps Halo save the universe from the Anti-Life Equation, joins the Outsiders, and helps them and the Team combat the Light. In the fourth season, Young Justice: Phantoms, Victor joins the Justice League.
- Cyborg appears in DC Super Hero Girls (2019), voiced again by Phil LaMarr.

=== Film ===
- Cyborg appears in Teen Titans: Trouble in Tokyo, voiced again by Khary Payton.
- An unnamed, alternate universe version of Cyborg makes a non-speaking appearance in Justice League: Crisis on Two Earths as a minor member of the Crime Syndicate.
- Cyborg appears in Justice League: Doom, voiced by Bumper Robinson. This version is a member of the Justice League.
- Cyborg appears in Lego Batman: The Movie – DC Super Heroes Unite, voiced by Brian Bloom.
- Cyborg appears in films set in the DC Animated Movie Universe (DCAMU), originally voiced by Michael B. Jordan and subsequently by Shemar Moore.
  - Cyborg first appears in Justice League: The Flashpoint Paradox as a member of the Justice League. Additionally, the Flashpoint incarnation of Cyborg appears, with his storyline playing out similarly to the comics until Aquaman kills him.
  - Cyborg appears in Justice League: War. This version is a skilled football player who was shunned by his father Silas Stone, who believes humanity's physical prowess means nothing once metahumans become the dominant species. Amidst an Apokoliptian invasion, Victor is mortally wounded by an energy blast. Silas brings him to an advanced machine built from international technology, but it fuses with Victor, who joins the future Justice League in halting the invasion using his ability to interface with Apokoliptian technology.
  - Cyborg makes subsequent appearances in Justice League: Throne of Atlantis, Justice League vs. Teen Titans, Justice League Dark, The Death of Superman, Reign of the Supermen, and Justice League Dark: Apokolips War. In Apokolips War, he sacrifices himself to transport Darkseid and Trigon into another dimension.
- Cyborg appears in JLA Adventures: Trapped in Time, voiced by Avery Waddell.
- Cyborg appears in the Lego DC Comics film series, voiced again by Khary Payton. This version is a member of the Justice League.
- Cyborg appears in Batman Unlimited: Monster Mayhem, voiced again by Khary Payton.
- A young, alternate universe version of Victor Stone appears in Justice League: Gods and Monsters, voiced by Tayla Parx. After Superman commissions Silas Stone to study Kryptonian technology, he and Victor are attacked and killed by a Metal Man designed to resemble and frame Superman.
- Cyborg makes a non-speaking appearance in The Lego Batman Movie as a member of the Justice League.
- Cyborg appears in DC Super Heroes vs. Eagle Talon, voiced by Wataru Takagi.
- Cyborg appears in Teen Titans Go! To the Movies, voiced again by Khary Payton.
- The Teen Titans Go! (2013) and Teen Titans (2003) incarnations of Cyborg appear in Teen Titans Go! vs. Teen Titans, with both voiced again by Khary Payton. In addition, several alternate universe versions of Cyborg also appear, including his Tiny Titans, New Teen Titans comic, and DCAMU counterparts.
- Cyborg appears in Injustice, voiced by Brandon Micheal Hall.
- The Teen Titans Go! (2013) incarnation of Cyborg appears in Teen Titans Go! & DC Super Hero Girls: Mayhem in the Multiverse, voiced again by Khary Payton.
- Cyborg appears in DC League of Super-Pets, voiced by Daveed Diggs. This version is a member of the Justice League who is battery-powered and sports a half-afro and an airplane mode that disables most of his abilities.
- Cyborg appears in Justice League x RWBY: Super Heroes & Huntsmen, voiced by Tru Valentino. This version is a member of the Justice League.

==== DC Extended Universe ====
Cyborg appears in films set in the DC Extended Universe (DCEU), portrayed by Ray Fisher. When interviewed by Vanity Fair after the release of Zack Snyder's Justice League, screenwriter Chris Terrio stated that he had worked extensively with Fisher on the development of the character. Terrio said that both men understood the "responsibility" of developing the first black superhero to appear in a DC film. While other black superheroes, such as Sam Wilson in the Marvel Cinematic Universe, appeared in film before Justice League, Cyborg was to be the first cast in a starring role for a big-budget film prior to the release of the MCU film Black Panther. Terrio was upset with the removal of much of his work on the theatrical cut, including Cyborg's backstory, and considered having his name taken off the film before realizing it would cause more problems for the film's already troubled production.

- Cyborg first appears in a cameo depicted in Batman v Superman: Dawn of Justice (2016).
- Cyborg appears in Justice League (2017) and the director's cut, Zack Snyder's Justice League (2021). In both films, the effects for his cybernetic parts were achieved using CGI.
- A stand-alone Cyborg film was originally scheduled for a release date of April 3, 2020, but has since been canceled.
- James Gunn, showrunner of the HBO Max series Peacemaker and later co-head of DC Studios, originally planned for the DCEU incarnations of Cyborg and Batman to appear with the Justice League in the show's season one finale, albeit portrayed by stand-ins. However, Warner Bros. had him remove the pair from the episode due to "upcoming DCEU projects".
- While he was originally slated to appear as Cyborg in the film The Flash with a major role, Fisher stated in January 2021 that he and his character had been removed from the film due to the involvement of DC Films head Walter Hamada, as Fisher's feud with Justice League replacement director Joss Whedon also grew to include Hamada for allegedly protecting the former.

=== Video games ===
- Cyborg appears as a playable character in Teen Titans (2005), voiced again by Khary Payton. This version is a member of the eponymous team.
- Cyborg appears in DC Universe Online, voiced by Alexander Brandon.
- Cyborg appears in LittleBigPlanet 2, voiced by Tom Clarke Hill.
- Cyborg appears as a playable character in Injustice: Gods Among Us, voiced again by Khary Payton. This version is a member of the Justice League. Additionally, an alternate reality Cyborg who became a member of Superman's Regime following the Teen Titans' deaths five years prior also appears.
- Cyborg appears in Scribblenauts Unmasked: A DC Comics Adventure. This version is a member of the Justice League.
- Cyborg appears as a playable character in Infinite Crisis, voiced again by Bumper Robinson.
- Cyborg appears in Teeny Titans, voiced again by Khary Payton.
- The Injustice incarnation of Cyborg appears as a playable character in Injustice 2, voiced again by Khary Payton. The Regime Cyborg remains allied with Regime Superman, who reluctantly join forces with Batman's Insurgency to thwart Brainiac's attack on Earth. Amidst this, Cyborg faces Grid, a robotic clone of him created by Brainiac.
- Cyborg appears as a playable character in DC Unchained.
- Cyborg appears in Justice League: Cosmic Chaos, voiced by Delbert Hunt.

==== Lego ====
- Cyborg appears as a playable character in Lego Batman 2: DC Super Heroes, voiced again by Brian Bloom.
- Cyborg appears as a playable character in Lego Batman 3: Beyond Gotham, voiced again by Bumper Robinson.
- Cyborg and the Teen Titans Go! (2013) incarnation of Cyborg appear as playable characters in Lego Dimensions, voiced again by Bumper Robinson and Khary Payton respectively.
- Cyborg appears as a playable character in Lego DC Super-Villains, voiced again by Bumper Robinson.

=== Merchandise ===
- A DC Animated Universe-inspired Cyborg figure was released in the Justice League Unlimited toyline in 2009.
- A Cyborg figure was released by DC Direct in 2001 as part of its Teen Titans series and in the 2003 Classic Titans Box Set, presented in gold bionics as opposed to his standard silver.
- Two versions of Cyborg were released in Mattel's DC Universe Classics action figure line: a standard version and a KB Toys exclusive version that features Cyborg with a "sonic arm".
- A Cyborg figure based on his New 52 Justice League design was released in late 2012.
- A minifigure of Cyborg appears in the DC Super Heroes series as part of the Lego Minifigures theme.

=== Miscellaneous ===
- The Teen Titans (2003) incarnation of Cyborg appears in Teen Titans Go! (2004).
- The Smallville incarnation of Cyborg appears in Smallville Legends: Justice & Doom.
- Cyborg appears in DC Super Hero Girls (2015) and its tie-in films, voiced again by Khary Payton. This version is a student at Super Hero High.
- The Injustice incarnation of Cyborg appears in the Injustice: Gods Among Us prequel comic.
- The Injustice incarnation of Cyborg appears in the Injustice 2 prequel comic as a prisoner of Stryker's Island.
- Cyborg appears in DC Heroes United, voiced by Jonathan E. Cruz.
- Cyborg appears in DC X Sonic the Hedgehog.

== See also ==
- Deathlok
- List of black superheroes
- List of DC Comics characters
- List of fictional cyborgs
- List of Justice League members
- List of Teen Titans members
- List of Teen Titans characters
