= List of Harvey Birdman, Attorney at Law and Birdgirl characters =

This article lists the characters that appear on the Hanna-Barbera/NBC program Birdman and the Galaxy Trio (1967–1968), Adult Swim program Harvey Birdman, Attorney at Law (2001–2007; 2018), its video game adaption, and its spin-off sequel series Birdgirl (2021–present), the latter two series being based on the title character's depictions in Space Ghost Coast to Coast (1994–2001; 2001–2004; 2006–2008)

== Overview ==
Character	Primarily voiced by	Birdman and the Galaxy Trio	Harvey Birdman						Birdgirl		Related series
Character	Primarily voiced by	Birdman and the Galaxy Trio	Attorney at Law					Attorney General	Season 1	Season 2	Space Ghost Coast to Coast
Character	Primarily voiced by	Birdman and the Galaxy Trio	Season 1	Season 2	Season 3	Season 4	Video game	Attorney General	Season 1	Season 2	Space Ghost Coast to Coast
Character	Primarily voiced by	1967–1968	2000–2003	2004	2005	2006–2007	2008	2018	2021	2022	1994–2009
=== Main characters ===
Harvey Raymond Randall "Ray" Birdman	Gary Cole	Main	Main	Main	Main	Main	Main	Main	Photograph	Photograph	Guest
Peanut / Birdboy	Thomas Michael Allen	Main	Main	Main	Main	Main	Main	Main	Photograph	Photograph	
Avenger	Various voices	Main	Main	Main	Main	Main	Main	Main			
Phil Ken Sebben Falcon Seven	Stephen Colbert (or as noted)	Main	Main	Main	Main	Main	Main; Stephen Stanton	Main			
Myron Reducto	Stephen Colbert (or as noted)	Guest	Main	Main	Main	Main	Main; Crispin Freeman	Main			
Judge Mentor / Mentok the Mind-Taker	John Michael Higgins	Guest	Main	Main	Main	Main	Main	Main			
X, the Eliminator / Exterminator	Peter MacNicol	Guest	Guest	Main	Main	Main	Main	Main			
Peter Potamus	Chris Edgerly		Guest	Main	Main	Main	Main	Main			
Judy Ken Sebben Bird Girl / Birdgirl	Paget Brewster	Guest			Guest	Recurring	Main	Main	Main	Main	
Black Vulcan	Phil LaMarr		Guest	Guest	Guest		Main	Main			
Ernie Devlin	Toby Huss			Guest	Guest	Guest	Main	Main			
"Deirdre"	Grey Griffin							Main			
The Narrator	Ferdinand Jay Smith III							Main			
Evie "The Big Ten"	Sonia Denis								Main	Main	
Gillian	Kether Donohue								Main	Main	
Dog with Bucket Hat	John Doman								Main	Main	
Meredith the Mind Taker	Negin Farsad								Main	Main	
Paul "The Feels"	Tony Hale								Main	Main	
Charlie "Strongarm"	River L. Ramirez								Main	Main	
=== Recurring characters ===
Gravity Girl "Gigi"	Debi Mae West	Main	Recurring	Recurring	Recurring	Recurring					
Judge Hiram Mightor	Gary Cole		Recurring	Recurring	Recurring	Recurring	Main				
The Bailiff	Various voices		Recurring	Recurring	Recurring	Recurring	Main				
The Bear	Various voices		Recurring	Recurring	Recurring	Recurring	Main				
Evelyn Spyro Throckmorton	Michael McKean		Recurring	Recurring	Recurring	Recurring	Main				
Zardo	John Michael Higgins	Guest	Guest	Recurring	Recurring	Recurring	Main				
Vulturo	Neil Ross	Guest	Guest	Recurring	Recurring	Recurring	Main				
Apache Chief	Maurice LaMarche		Recurring	Recurring			Main				
Antonio de Ribera Garcia Azul Falcone	Maurice LaMarche		Recurring				Main				
Stan Freezoid	Maurice LaMarche			Recurring			Main				
Deadly Duplicator	Lewis Black	Guest			Guest	Recurring					
=== Minor characters ===
Number One Alexander the Bartender	Various voices	Main		Guest							
Mr. Fezz	Various voices			Guest							
M‽‽butu Junior	Various voices			Guest							

== Main characters ==
=== Harvey Birdman ===
Harvey Birdman (voiced by Gary Cole) is a superhero who starred in the Hanna-Barbera show Birdman and the Galaxy Trio in the 1960s. Birdman's secret alter ego from that show, Ray Randall, is not mentioned in this series, though it can be found hidden in the opening credits; as well, in the episode "Deadomutt, Part 2", a police mugshot of Harvey identifies him as "Harvey R. R. Birdman", indicating his full legal name is now Harvey Raymond Randall Birdman.

Birdman gets strength and power from sunlight, and grows weak if kept away from the sun for too long. His superpowers include flight, though as Harvey Birdman, he often completely forgets about this. He also has the ability to create a shield of solid light, and the ability to shoot destructive energy beams from his fists. These powers are thought to stem from the crest on his helmet, though Harvey is not entirely sure of the crest's true role in his powers.

He has since retired from his superhero job and is now working for the law firm of Sebben & Sebben. Harvey is generally honest, a little dim, 6'6", and has large wings growing out of his back, genetically inherited from his father. His clients consist of other Hanna-Barbera characters of the past and present.

Birdman was seemingly killed in the series finale when run over by a bus, but turns out to be a clone of him created in the penultimate episode as he appears in the epilogue movie.

=== Phil Ken Sebben / Falcon 7 ===
Phil Ken Sebben (voiced by Stephen Colbert in the TV series, Stephen Stanton in the video game) is the deranged president and co-founder of the law firm Sebben & Sebben. In the original Birdman series, Phil's character was codenamed "Falcon Seven" (Falcon 7). His name in Harvey Birdman, Attorney at Law is a play on these words (Falcon Seven = Phil Ken Sebben). He is recognizable by his blond hair, an eyepatch and a dark suit. He co-founded the firm with twin brother Bill when they were twenty-six years old, the two only told apart by having their eyepatches on opposite eyes. He has a habit of laughing whenever he says a double entendre or a non sequitur, followed by a short joke. For instance, his arm seems to have been turned backward after falling off a building. Once he gets up, Phil asks a passerby "Hey lady, I need a yank. Ha ha, Dislocation."

Flashbacks to Phil's childhood invariably show him engaging in extremely dangerous practices to his left eye, yet did not go blind in that eye until he became an office worker. These same flashbacks also show that he believes his eyepatch not to be his most noticeable physical characteristic, but rather an embarrassing scar which he received from a broken binder clip (which he grew his mustache to cover). He has numerous vision problems; it is implied that he is blind in the eye not covered by his eyepatch, and he states that he "sees everything 3 feet to the left" of where they really are, and must account for this fact. Said partial blindness causes him to kill Birdman in the series finale by hitting him with the bus that supposedly killed him in an earlier part of the season, crashing it into a building and showing everyone Birdman's blood to confirm his death. He was the 46.5th United States president in Harvey Birdman Attorney General and was killed off in Birdgirl. First appearance: "Death By Chocolate."

=== Peanut / Birdboy ===
Peanut (voiced by Thomas Michael Allen) is Harvey's old protégé as Birdboy, who was hired by Harvey to be his legal clerk. Unlike Birdman, Peanut's powers are not biological; his wings are mechanical, and his shield and energy beams come from "power bands" on his wrists. In most cases, he is unnervingly cool and calculated, often in extreme contrast to the goings-on around him, but can often be seen working behind the scenes towards uncertain or explicitly seedy ends, often sexual in nature, involving Harvey's female clients, or females associated with clients. He sports a pink and green sweater-vest and often speaks in a hushed and whispered tone. He has an ongoing rivalry/partnership with Avenger where they dig a large hole in the middle of Harvey's office or play Foozball, bombing Harvey in his sleep with a toy plane (but with real bombs), and even assembling a depth charge in the office, together. He speaks Japanese, Spanish and French. First appearance: "Shaggy Busted."

=== Avenger ===
Avenger (various voices) is a large purple eagle. He is Harvey's old sidekick, who now serves as his legal secretary. Avenger sits on a perch on Harvey's desk and sleeps in a canary cage in the office at night. Avenger's tasks usually involve taking dictation or filing. Avenger is badly hindered by his inability to speak, even though it is clear that he can understand, or at least perceive the meaning in, the speech of other characters. Avenger can type and write English by claw, and Harvey seems to understand every "caw" he says.

=== Myron Reducto ===
Myron Reducto (voiced by Stephen Colbert in the TV series, Crispin Freeman in the video game) is a former enemy of Birdman on Birdman and the Galaxy Trio, now he is an attorney at Freezoid, Zarog & Skon, and is one of Harvey's most common courtroom opponents, as well as one of Birdman's closest friends. He is a small man with green-tinged skin, and brandishes a raygun that shrinks its target. He is highly obsessive compulsive about items smaller than he (Atom Ant and Inch High Private Eye for example) and usually responds with "BACK OFF" and using his Shrink Gun to ward them off. He is also prone to occasional paranoid and/or conspiracy theorist monologues, again about people who are smaller than he is. He drives a Mini Cooper. He ends up being killed off in "Babysitter" when run over by a clown car. First appearance: "Very Personal Injury."

=== Mentok the Mind-Taker ===
Judge Mentok the Mind-Taker (voiced by John Michael Higgins) is a former enemy of Birdman on Birdman and the Galaxy Trio, now he is a court judge who often hears his cases. He has various psychic powers including: teleportation, telepathy, hypnotism, precognition, and telekinesis—all referred to as "mind taking"—but he rarely uses them for anything beyond sophomoric mischief. He has been given the personality of a cocky and flamboyant stage magician; because of this, he often predicts the result of the cases he presides over before they have even started. Indeed, he often appears bored during trial; an expressionless look with his head resting in his hands. He often makes an entrance, such as appearing in a cloud of smoke or from a bolt of lightning. Mentok's gavel is a brain on a handle, which squishes when struck. He also seems to enjoy patronizing people such as Inch High Private Eye and especially the courtroom's bailiff, while the bailiff usually just ignores him and stares forward with a blank expression. During his time on Earth, Mentok has worked as a mufti, a genie, a sex trade worker, a Cossack, and an E.S.T. instructor. His main catchphrase is "Booweeoop" to give the impression of eerie sci-fi theremin music and is said whilst moving his hands around in a circular motion often when 'Mind Taking'. It has also been implied in several episodes that he is a cannabis user. First appearance: "Shoyu Weenie."

He was originally known as Mentor in Birdman and the Galaxy Trio.

=== X the Eliminator ===
X the Eliminator (voiced by Peter MacNicol) is a former enemy of Birdman on Birdman and the Galaxy Trio, It was originally commissioned by the organization F.E.A.R. to kill Birdman and bring the crest as proof; in this series, X does, in fact, suggest killing Birdman, which F.E.A.R. reacts to with surprise. His failure to do so has, over several decades, turned him into a stalking fanatic with a love–hate relationship with Birdman, despite the fact, Birdman had completely forgotten about him until meeting him once after becoming a lawyer. X's tool of choice is an ungainly silver death console with a telescoping laser emitter that uses obsolete vacuum tube technology. It takes so long to recharge, Harvey has time to escape. He once had a camera in Harvey's office but Harvey destroyed it shortly after realizing it was there (it was only seen once as a gag). X sometimes arrives at Harvey's office to destroy him, but tends to be thwarted by inattentive office personnel. According to the credits of the episode of his first appearance, one of the voiced characters is known as "X's Wife". Other evidence seems to suggest he lives with his close friend Zardo as well. First appearance: "X, the Exterminator."

=== Peter Potamus ===
Peter Potamus (voiced by Joe Alaskey in his first appearance, Chris Edgerly in later appearances) is an employee at Sebben & Sebben. It usually is not clear on what Potamus actually does at Sebben & Sebben; however, in the episode Harvey's Civvy he did defend Harvey Birdman as his lawyer. Peter Potamus is known for always asking everyone "Did you get that thing that I sent ya?" The thing that he sent is usually never explained, unless it is served as a plot device (Ex: Harvey's Civvy, if Shado received the documents for request for discovery). His character started out small, only known for asking if people received "that thing" he sent them, and for being with a woman, only to have another character somehow spot him, by which he always responds "What the?" But soon he became a regular full-time character, usually in meetings with other staff members or as someone witnessing a trial. According to Phil, Potamus is considered to be "An earner" (Ex: In episode Gone Efficien...t, Phil states that chairs are for earners, and we see that Potamus possesses all the chairs). It is implied that he is Jewish. First appearance: "Deadomutt".

=== Judy Ken Sebben / Birdgirl ===
Judy Ken Sebben (voiced by Paget Brewster) is Phil's daughter. Upon meeting Harvey, she professes an immediate interest in his work, dressing up as "Birdgirl" and attempting to secure a position as his sidekick. When she is in costume, she is constantly hit on by Phil, who does not realize that they are related. She is prone to making monologues about her secret identity when she undergoes an internal crisis, often failing to realize that others are within earshot. The monologues, however, are never noticed. Near the end of the series, after Phil is seemingly killed by a bus, she takes control of the law firm. The character has her own sequel series of the same name which aired from 2021 to 2022. First appearance: "Bird Girl of Guantanamole".

=== Brian O'Brien ===
Brian O'Brien (voiced by Rob Delaney) is the head of human waste at Sebben & Sebben Worldwide.

=== Evie / The Big Ten ===
Evie "The Big Ten" (voiced by Sonia Denis) is the daughter of one of Sebben & Sebben Worldwide's workers who is friends with the building as she can understand it.

=== Gillian ===
Gillian (voiced by Kether Donohue) is Judy's secretary at Sebben & Sebben Worldwide.

=== Dog with Bucket Hat ===
Dog with Bucket Hat (voiced by John Doman) is an anthropomorphic Basset Hound that wears a bucket hat who is the head of security at Sebben & Sebben Worldwide.

=== Meredith the Mind Taker ===
Meredith the Mind Taker (voiced by Negin Farsad) is the general manager of Sebben & Sebben Worldwide who is the best friend of Judy with mind-taking abilities.

=== Paul "The Feels" ===
Paul "The Feels" (voiced by Tony Hale) is Sebben & Sebben Worldwide's residential masseur.

=== Charlie "Strongarm" ===
Charlie "Strongarm" (voiced by River L. Ramirez) is Sebben & Sebben Worldwide's head of public relations.

== Recurring characters ==
=== Hiram Mightor ===
Judge Hiram Mightor (voiced by Gary Cole) was a Hanna-Barbera superhero of the 1960s known as Mighty Mightor, one who lived in prehistoric times and got his powers from a magic club. He dresses in traditional judge's robes and wig. He is the subject of several recurring themes such as his mispronunciation of Harvey's last name (such as Mr. Bumnuts) and coughing up objects relevant to the trials he presides over. Whenever a double entendre is made about male genitalia, there is a cutaway to Mightor swinging a long, thin object around and saying "Deedle deedle dee." First appearance: "Bannon Custody Battle."

=== The Bailiff ===
The Bailiff is the court's unnamed bailiff. His main function is to announce the arrival of the judge, and Mentok in particular often has the Bailiff announce him in a particularly grand fashion. Often picked on by Mentok who is shown at one stage explaining to The Bailiff the importance of mind taking. First appearance: "Shoyu Weenie."

=== The Bear ===
The Bear is a character who is constantly shown, but never speaks. He usually shows up when the characters are laughing at the end of the episode. In one of the DVD extras, the creators explain that the first time they used the Bear (pointing up at Apache Chief in a photo), he stole the shot and was summarily brought back in the next episode before becoming a permanent, if irrelevant, cast member. Show creator Erik Richter described the Bear as "the most zen creature on Earth". First appearance: "Very Personal Injury".

=== Azul Falcone ===
Azul Falcone (voiced by Maurice LaMarche) is modeled after Batman-esque Hanna-Barbera superhero Blue Falcon. Azul is an attorney hired from outside to become a partner in the firm, and becomes a chief rival to an aspiring Harvey who has been trying to get a partnership with the Sebben & Sebben firm. He speaks with a Spanish accent, although it is never determined from what country he hails. Harvey and Azul play games of one-upsmanship to try and damage the other's reputation. First appearance: "Deadomutt, Part 1".

=== Stan Freezoid ===
Stan Freezoid (voiced by Maurice LaMarche) is another former enemy of Birdman, now a named partner of the Freezoid, Zarog, and Skon law firm, He is usually presented as an amiable, level-headed attorney but has been known to fiercely lose his temper. A master of ice, he usually freezes the ground he walks on as well as most anything he touches. First appearance: "The Devlin Made Me Do It".

=== Apache Chief ===
Apache Chief (voiced by Maurice LaMarche) is a small-time superhero and former member of the Super Friends, whose power is enlarging himself to immense size. Apache Chief once hired Harvey to represent him in a case where he spilled hot coffee on himself and burned his genitals, losing the ability to enlarge. From then on, he appears in various episodes with a deep fear of coffee trying not to burn himself again. As a fellow third-string superhero, Harvey often comes to Apache for advice such as having him talk to Peanut about going through "superty". First appearance: "Very Personal Injury."

=== Black Vulcan ===
Black Vulcan (voiced by Phil LaMarr) is a small-time superhero who was once a member of the Super Friends. His power is that of lightning, which he sums up as, "Pure electricity... in my pants." He used to insist upon being called "Super Volt," but has since accepted "Black Vulcan" as his super-moniker, although he insists he got the name because of racism. In most of his appearances, he or another character says some variation on the phrase, "In my pants." First appearance: "Very Personal Injury."

=== Zardo ===
Zardo (voiced by John Michael Higgins) is a former enemy of Birdman, having relented his criminal ways apparently to be a home-maker and best friend of X the Eliminator. He has a mace in place of a left hand, is never seen without his bullet-shaped helmet (through which only his eyes can be seen), and speaks with a German accent. Although he does his best to assist X, he is frequently annoyed by the fact X considers himself "alone". First appearance: "X, the Exterminator."

=== Gigi ===
Gigi (voiced by Debi Mae West) was Gravity Girl (GG, hence the name Gigi) from the Galaxy Trio, the original show's run-up feature. She is a very promiscuous "gold digger" girl who has sex with everyone and is not even trying to hide it. First appearing in Season 2 episodes 2, Birdman fell in love with her, but after she moved in his house – bringing her two boyfriends – she continuously kept cheating on Birdman with Phil, Potamus and many others, often right in front of him. Except for Birdman – whenever he tries to make a move in their relationship, she stops her saying "I'm not ready for that yet!" In the end, she marries Birdman, Phil, Peanut, the two Galaxy Trio Members and the Bear. She later appears in episodes, usually being courted or engaging in sex with some character, while Birdman remarks that she is his – or their – wife. In one episode, Judge Mentok takes her out on a date which goes awkwardly due to a brain-swapped Spyro.

=== Vulturo ===
Vulturo (voiced by Neil Ross) first appeared as an enemy of Birdman in two episodes of Birdman and the Galaxy Trio. Now he is a rival lawyer. Voiced by Neil Ross, he speaks with a slight British accent, wears a bird mask on his head, and has a hangout that is based on the Batcave. One time he had Avenger as a sidekick, but he decided to fire him. His speech often delves in and out of incomprehensible gibberish. First appearance: "Bannon Custody Battle".

=== Evelyn Spyro Throckmorton ===
Evelyn Spyro Throckmorton (voiced by Michael McKean) is a lawyer who often represents against Birdman. He argues his cases with a decidedly thespian flair, often casting himself in re-enactments of pertinent scenes.

=== Deadly Duplicator ===
Deadly Duplicator (voiced by Lewis Black) is a villain from Birdman's superhero days who continues to be his enemy. First seen (in this series) in the background during Murro the Marauder's civil suit against Harvey, Professor Elliott Taggart later became a recurring character who's determined to destroy Birdman. First appearances: "Harvey's Civvy" (non-speaking cameo), "Identity Theft" (speaking role).

== Minor characters ==
=== Alexander the Bartender / Number One ===
Alexander the Bartender is the man behind the counter at The Birdcage, a bar Harvey frequents with his friends, and the former Number One, the leader of F.E.A.R., an organization that was determined to destroy Birdman in his superhero days. First appearance: "Very Personal Injury."

=== Mr. Fezz ===
Mr. Fezz is a man from somewhere around Saudi Arabia. He is a short bald man, wearing a red fez, a pink vest, and white pants. He usually steals Harvey's office supplies. First appearance: "Grape Juiced."

=== M!!butu Junior ===
M!!butu Junior is M!!!butu's son. He is identical to M!!!butu, but is slightly shorter. He is a master of voodoo arts and is quite nifty with a blow dart. According to Phil, he doesn't understand English. First appearance: "Grape Juiced."

== See also ==
- Birdman and the Galaxy Trio
- Harvey Birdman, Attorney at Law
