= List of Harvey Birdman, Attorney at Law episodes =

Harvey Birdman, Attorney at Law is an American adult animated television sitcom created by Michael Ouweleen and Erik Richter that aired on Cartoon Network's late night programming block, Adult Swim. The series is about the life and career of Harvey Birdman, an attorney for Sebben & Sebben law firm, who regularly represents various Hanna-Barbera characters.

An early version of the pilot episode originally aired months prior to the launch of Adult Swim on Cartoon Network unannounced on December 30, 2000. It later made its official debut on Adult Swim on September 2, 2001 (the same night the network launched) and ended on July 22, 2007, with a total of 39 episodes, over the course of 4 seasons. The entire series has been made available on DVD, and other forms of home media, including on demand streaming on Hulu. A half-hour long special, entitled Harvey Birdman: Attorney General, premiered on Adult Swim on October 15, 2018.

== Series overview ==
Series overview
| Season | Episodes | Originally released | |
| Season | Episodes | First released | Last released |
|---|---|---|---|
| 1 | 9 | December 30, 2000 | June 8, 2003 |
| 2 | 11 | January 1, 2004 | November 2, 2004 |
| 3 | 12 | July 24, 2005 | October 23, 2005 |
| 4 | 7 | October 1, 2006 | July 22, 2007 |
| Special | | October 12, 2018 | |

== Episodes ==
=== Season 1 (2000–03) ===
| No. | Title | Directed by | Original release date | Prod. code |
|---|---|---|---|---|
| 1 | "Bannon Custody Battle" | J. J. Sedelmaier | December 30, 2000 (on Cartoon Network); September 2, 2001 (on Adult Swim) | 2001 |
Race Bannon tells Dr. Benton Quest that Race is like a father to the children and wants custody of them. Attorney Harvey Birdman has to prove Benton, who cannot even remember his sons' names, is the better father. (Note: Other than Harvey, Avenger and Mightor, this episode does not include any of the series recurring characters, and the law firm of Sebben and Sebben is not mentioned.) At court, Vulturo represents Race, although his speech impediment confuses the jury. He claims that genetics should not determine fatherhood, and calls various witnesses who say that Bannon is the better father. (Note: These are villains from the original Jonny Quest series.) The next day, Harvey reveals that the "Race Bannon" that has been put on the stand is a robot; the stenographer is actually Dr. Zin who was behind the whole thing, in an attempt to get the boys away from Bannon and Quest. Dr. Zin is taken away and Harvey wins the case. The real Race is on vacation, and had been playing volleyball with many men.
| 2 | "Very Personal Injury" | Vincent Waller | September 23, 2001 | 10-02 |
Apache Chief, the Native American former Super Friend who has the power to change sizes, saves the city from a meteor. Afterwards, he heads into Javalux for a cup of coffee; while searching for money, he accidentally spills the hot coffee on his lap. Having lost his ability to enlarge, he goes to see Harvey, shrinking in fear when the latter offers him a hot drink. They go to court to sue Javalux, the other attorney being the paranoid Reducto. (Note: Apache Chief's suit against Javalux is a reference to the 1994 case Liebeck v. McDonald's Restaurants - in which an elderly woman sued McDonald's for medical bills/damages she incurred after spilling their hot coffee resulted in such severe burns/injuries that she required a hospital stay and skin grafts.) Harvey brings to the witness stand some super heroes who have worked with Apache Chief. (Note: This episode marks the first appearance of the Bear; also, Apache Chief, Black Vulcan, and Reducto.) At the Birdcage, Reducto suggest settling, but Birdman says it is not about the money, and how Apache Chief just wants to be recognized. He says that if Apache Chief felt appreciated, the case would likely go away. At court, Reducto calls Sybil Shussler, the manager of the Javalux shop. Under questioning, she speaks out about Apache Chief's heroism and benefit to society. Enamored, Apache Chief grows to fill the courtroom. Mightor dismisses the case. Apache Chief and other heroes (as well as Jesse Jackson) later decide to form the "Multi-Culture Pals". Apache Chief also starts dating Sybil.
| 3 | "Shaggy Busted" | Vincent Waller | July 7, 2002 | 10-03 |
The Mystery Machine is pulled over for erratic driving. Its driver, Shaggy, claims that and he was going to meet up with his gang to catch a monster. The officer thinks Shaggy and Scooby are under the influence and asks them to step out. They instead speed off. At Sebben & Sebben, Harvey starts interviewing for a clerk. He is impressed by Peanut, a young man who dresses like himself, and decides to hire him. Fred Jones hires Harvey and brings him to jail to see Scooby and Shaggy. The gang tries to assure everyone that they are not high, just stupid. The case goes to court. The officer claims to have found drug paraphernalia, but Harvey manages to show this as circumstantial. On the stand, Velma says that they are just always hungry and laugh when nervous. This supports an earlier defense claim that clips of old Scooby-Doo cartoons shown by the prosecution have been taken out of context to show Shaggy and Scooby as stoners. On the second day of the trial, Fred and Velma burst into the court with the monster in custody. They unmask him to be Old Man Bakov, who reveals his nefarious plans. Everybody laughs, including Bakov.
| 4 | "Death by Chocolate" | Ben Jones | July 14, 2002 | 10-04 |
In Jellystone Park, Yogi and Boo-Boo are awakened by ATF agents who accidentally fire a tear gas canister into the bears' cave. Phil Ken Sebben (Note: in his first appearance.) orders Harvey to defend Boo-Boo, who is accused of being a terrorist known as the Unabooboo. (Note: A takeoff of the Unabomber.) In the trial, the prosecution provides a manifesto produced on an electric typewriter with a misaligned 'T' key as evidence. Harvey argues that this could not have been written by Boo-Boo as there is no electricity in their cave. Yogi further adds that both he and Boo-Boo are illiterate. Boo-Boo is eventually found not guilty. He and Harvey embrace, and then spend the night together in his cave. While Boo-Boo is out horseback riding, Harvey discovers an electric typewriter in the cave, hooked up to a generator. Testing the typewriter. While typing a 'T', he adjusts the carriage to make it misaligned without realizing. Panicking, Harvey runs home; Boo-Boo breaks in, saying that he wants to thank him for his work. Fearing for his life, Harvey kills him with an energy blast. Phil comes in to comfort Harvey, then Yogi comes in and swears revenge… and then all of them, including Boo-Boo (possibly revived by Yogi's laughter), laugh together. (Note: The plot of this episode is a parody of the 1985 film Jagged Edge.)
| 5 | "Shoyu Weenie" | Ben Jones | July 21, 2002 | 34-6105 |
Shoyu Weenie, (Note: meant to sound like "show your weenie".) an overworked Japanese rock band, (Note: which is composed of Chinese characters from "The Amazing Chan and the Chan Clan", with Mr. Chan as their band manager.) learns that their number one hit has been plagiarized by an American band called The Neptunes. (Note: The band is composed of characters from the Jabberjaw animated series.) They hire Harvey; Peanut translates for them, as he speaks Japanese. Reducto finds himself falling for testifying musicologist Gale Melody, mainly because of her "tiny, tiny feet." Judge Mentok (Note: who appears for the first time in this episode.) and Harvey are also attracted to her, which causes some disruption in the courtroom. Peanut settles the case by showing a karaoke film of both songs; Mentok declares that they are the same song and finds for the plaintiffs. Just as Harvey and friends are celebrating their victory, however, they find out that the song has been stolen again, this time by a German band.
| 6 | "The Dabba Don (Note: The title is a joke on Fred's famous catchphrase "Yabba Dabba Doo" and the nickname of mob boss John Gotti, the "Dapper Don.")" | Robert Alvarez | July 28, 2002 | 34-6106 |
Fred Flintstone is a Mafia Don, and the clueless Harvey defends him. Judge Mightor, formerly on the Mafia payroll, suffers two attempts on his life and disappears. Judge Mentok finishes the case. Harvey, using clips from the original Flintstones show, successfully argues that Fred is delusional, having been hit on the head with a bowling ball so many times that he frequently adopts other personas. It turns out that he is right, as Barney Rubble is the real mob boss.
| 7 8 | "Deadomutt"(Parts 1 and 2) | Robert Alvarez | May 25, 2003 June 1, 2003 | 34-6107 34-6108 |
Birdman believes he is in line to become a lead partner at Sebben & Sebben. Instead, Harvey learns that the position is going to the firm's newest hire Azul Falcone, a man who charms everyone he comes across. Soon, Harvey becomes the office doormat, eventually being forced to take on some of Falcone's case load. Azul is actually an incompetent lawyer, and his assistant Dynomutt does all his work. Harvey gets his résumé and heads to the office copier, intending to work at a new firm. Phil looks for Harvey, only to find him covered in ink and crying beside the opened copy machine, Dynomutt's remains strewn about its inner workings. He is taken into custody. Harvey is on trial for murdering Dynomutt. Falcone represents him, because no one else will take the case. Despite Falcone's bad representation, the jury finds Birdman innocent. Mentok overrides the jury and convicts Birdman, sentencing him to death. Harvey is in jail for three and a half years, forgetting he can fly, forgetting and re-learning how to read, keeping a pet moth, and marrying Magilla Gorilla. At the end of that time, just before his execution, the gang surprises him with a birthday party. Dynomutt is still alive; the whole thing was a practical joke dreamed up by Falcone.
| 9 | "X, the Exterminator (Note: This episode marks the first appearance (in this series) of X the Eliminator, who becomes a prominent recurring character.)" | Michael Ouweleen & Erik Richter | June 8, 2003 | 34-6109 |
As a young man, X (nicknamed the Eliminator) was commissioned by the evil organization F.E.A.R. to obtain the Crest on Birdman's helmet. After 26 years, he has acquired a paunch and an obsession for Birdman, but no Crest. A commercial featuring Harvey inspires him to renew his quest. Meanwhile, Harvey is defending Phil, who is hit someone on his way to work "every day this week" and is being sued. Harvey is distracted by X's attacks and the fact that every time he tries to go to the bathroom something happens to prevent him from finishing. Even resorting to walking on the ledge of the outside of the building to avoid X, who was waiting outside his office. In the end, with Avenger's help, Harvey defeats X, wins his case, and finishes his business in the bathroom. (Note: This is the first episode in which we actually see Harvey's secretary, Debbie.)

=== Season 2 (2004) ===
Note: From episode 10 to the end of the series, all episodes were directed by Richard Ferguson-Hull.

| No. | Title | Original release date | Prod. code |
|---|---|---|---|
| 10 | "Blackwatch Plaid (Note: The episode title is a reference to the tartan of the Black Watch regiment.)" | January 1, 2004 | 625-014 |
While on a mission, Secret Squirrel needs to get a special spy gadget out of his trench coat. As Secret whips the coat open, a woman he was trying to help screams and collapses. Confused, Secret says "Wait, I didn't even pull it out yet!". Meanwhile, Phil's office is burgled. He is missing things only he can see, such as a baby grand piano and a 14-foot golden Buddha. He sets up a color-coded threat system and installs security cameras. Birdman tries to talk to the paranoid Phil, who accuses him of supporting the thief and of not working hard. He says that Harvey must get a big case by the end of the day. Harvey tries, with limited success. Phil calls everyone in and bumps up the terror level to "Blackwatch Plaid". Harvey speaks with Secret, who explains his case to him. Phil finds a video of Bear moving at high speeds and calls everyone in, believing that he knows who the culprit is, and shows everyone a sketch of Bear crossed with Osama bin Laden. He raises the threat level to the maximum. In court, Harvey explains how Secret hides his spy equipment in his trench coat. Phil, however, has surveillance video that proves Secret was flashing the woman, and is guilty. The gang later tries to figure out how to get their privacy back. Peanut's video of Phil playing Little Bo Peep with a woman apparently fixes things. (Note: Most of the animation used in here was re-used from earlier episodes, mostly "Deadomutt: 1" and "2", as well as clips from "Shaggy Busted" and "SPF". The only original scenes were of Phil trying to open his door and any live action footage. This was something older cartoons would sometimes do to cut costs, this episode being a parody of that.)
| 11 | "Trio's Company" | April 18, 2004 | 625-012 |
Inch High P.I. is fired because all of his photos are useless due to their perspective being from an inch off the ground and goes to Harvey for representation. Harvey ignores him, having joined a new spa. A red-head named Gigi works there and ends up making out with every man in the place but Harvey. He asks her out, and she moves into his apartment, along with her friends Vince and Terry. Harvey's relationship with Gigi continues, but they never as much as kiss, while she is found in compromising positions with every other man in the office. Inch High's case makes it to court. There, Mentok uses Reducto's shrink-ray to bring Inch High up to normal height. After having a carnie repeatedly say that he is tall enough for a ride, Inch High proceeds to show a tape of Gigi writing in her diary that she loves Harvey. The two embrace, and Mentok declares that he has no idea what just happened, and randomly gives the verdict of not guilty. The episode ends with a wedding between Gigi, Harvey, Phil, Vince, Terry, Peanut, and the Bear.
| 12 | "The Devlin Made Me Do It (Note: The title of the episode is a reference to Flip Wilson's catchphrase "The Devil made me do it!".)" | April 25, 2004 | 625-011 |
A kid tries to imitate Ernie Devlin's deep ravine jump, and seriously injures himself. The family sues Devlin, and Harvey is called to defend him. Things do not look good after Birdman almost kills the kid trying to prove he can move. Freezoid's case does not help much either. After a discussion with Devlin, Harvey reveals that Devlin has pumped himself so full of pain killers from all his injuries that he had little to no common sense. He gives a plea of insanity, but Der Spuzmacher, a Tapir assassin that Devlin warned about earlier and Harvey disregarded as insane rambling, comes in and reveals that insanity pleas can only be used in a criminal case. Birdman loses, but Devlin and Bobby come to an agreement. Bobby can ride Devlin's bike whenever he wants, and his woman. (Note: A side story that was removed left a few fragments. Avenger apparently lays an egg, and after a discussion between Harvey and Peanut about the whereabouts of its genitals, the two are interrupted by Devlin's entrance. Later in court, Harvey is seen nursing an Egg with an eagle hand puppet, and later it turns out the egg was the hidden lunch of Peter Potamus, who tried to take the egg back and is attacked by Avenger. The egg later hatches to reveal a half bird/half Jesse Jackson.)
| 13 | "High Speed Buggy Chase" | May 2, 2004 | 625-013 |
A television changes from one channel to another, all of them showing a breaking news story. It is a high speed chase, involving Speed Buggy, a living car. The chase ends as Speed Buggy attempts to climb the median "on foot". Back at the office, Avenger resigns. He goes off to find another job and joins up with Vulturo, whose avian colleague was recently stuffed. Meanwhile, Harvey goes through a series of assistants, including a European goldfinch, an emperor penguin and an emu. Finally, he settles on a parrot. The Speed Buggy case comes up, and it is Birdman vs. Vulturo. The parrot, however, ends up working for Vulturo. Avenger returns to Birdman's side, opening a door and revealing that Mark and Debbie, Speed Buggy's friends who have been recently making out, have been sitting on Speed Buggy's remote control. Debbie's automotive double entendres have been causing Speed Buggy's erratic behavior. He is found not guilty.
| 14 | "Back to the Present" | May 9, 2004 | 625-010 |
In the far off year of 2002, the Jetsons live in their futuristic house high above the Earth's surface. Their lives change when the water level begins rapidly rising. Global warming caused the ice caps to melt, and the Earth to become nothing but water. Mutants begin breaking into the house, which cannot get high enough to be out of the water's reach. The Jetsons travel to the distant past (2004), specifically to Harvey's office. They want to sue everyone for screwing up Earth for them. The case goes to court, but George has a problem with the jury. X sets up the Jury Vac, a robotic jury, and the trial is underway. Mentok clashes with boy genius Elroy, who has a device from the future that announces past events before Mentok does them. Freezoid uses his powers of cold on the warm August day to show how global warming is preposterous. Jury Vac eventually gives the verdict on the O.J. Simpson trial. The Jetsons lose the case, and after revealing Harvey is descended from George, the family return to their own time, (Note: using the DeLorean from the Back to the Future films.) as rising water levels surround Harvey and the gang. Everyone, however, laughs.
| 15 | "SPF" | May 16, 2004 | 625-015 |
After years of getting his powers from the sun, Harvey notices a mole that resembles Frida Kahlo on his face and goes to a doctor, who suggests he wear SPF-710 sunblock and keep in the shade. This is a problem since Harvey gets his energy from sunlight. He manages to get by without the sun by using "Tanning Crème" (Note: a foreign branding joke.) he gets from Peanut. The energy rush causes Harvey to become addicted, needing it just to stay awake, and Peanut starts charging exorbitant prices for it. Harvey goes to trial, representing Ding-a-Ling Wolf, who wanted to make a web site for all his fans. However, Harry Twiddles had already set up a porn site at the URL www.dingaling.biz. (Note: The naked woman on the website's homepage is a compilation of classical nude paintings.) Harvey brings before the court others whose names had been hijacked for porn sites. An intervention is staged for Harvey by all the others (who are indulging in vices themselves, including smoking, gambling, and drinking). Harvey goes into counseling, and is soon back to normal. Afterwards, the mole is found by Peanut to just be gravy. (Note: This was the first episode animated using Macromedia Flash.)
| 16 | "Grape Juiced" | May 30, 2004 | 625-016 |
Grape Ape comes out to compete in the Laff-a-Lympics. He goes through his ribbon dancing routine flawlessly, but when he takes a bow, all manner of pills, including steroids, fall from his uniform. Harvey walks into his office to find a giant urine sample waiting for him. Phil comes in with the Laff-a-Lympics committee, who begin to steal things from Harvey's office, something they continue to do through the whole episode. Phil hopes to get the Laff-a-Lympics to come to their city. He has a big night planned with all of them and Gigi, his (and Harvey's, and everyone else's) shared wife. Gigi comes in, and she is pregnant. She claims Harvey is the father, though he does not recall their ever engaging in sexual congress and they have only recently met. Harvey and Reducto talk about the situation, as well as the Grape Ape case that they are both working on. Reducto sees the primate, and shrinks him down to fun-size. Grape Ape then grabs a weight and pumps it until he grows back to his usual size, which sends Reducto off screaming about how he has met the unshrinkable. The courtroom is splattered with ads. Gigi interrupts the case to leech off Harvey, but upon his return he speaks with unnaturally muscular witnesses who all claim Grape Ape had nothing to do with steroids. Reducto's witness describes the side-effects of steroid use, including withered testicles, which Reducto seizes upon since Grape Ape should show reproductive organs the size of a nearby vendor's pushcart. An expert is about to reveal the test results when he is hit by a dart in the neck by Harvey's new paralegal, son of a shaman/member of the Laff-a-Lympics committee. Eleven of the jury members vote "guilty", but the French member votes "not guilty". Mentok disregards this and convicts Grape Ape anyway. The doctor wakes up from the dart, and reveals that Grape Ape is the father of Gigi's baby. Also, the Laff-a-Lympics go to Dallas. Grape Ape and the others have to perform a court-ordered song about drugs as a sentence.
| 17 | "Peanut Puberty" | June 6, 2004 | 625-017 |
During a board meeting of Sebben & Sebben, Peanut's light shield starts growing uncontrollably. He is going through "superty", the period in which a young superhero acquires his powers, and Harvey tries to help him. Meanwhile, Augie Doggie comes to Harvey for help. They have put his father in a cage, claiming that he bit someone. The case goes to trial, and Mentok claims that Doggie Daddy is baring his teeth, and sentences him to undergo aggressiveness training. Phil trains him, treating him like a normal dog, humiliating and torturing him. Harvey seeks advice from other superheroes, but they do not help much. What does the trick is Peanut's conversation with Black Vulcan about his first time fighting a villain. Meanwhile, Harvey is speaking with villains about helping Peanut with his first time and gets one to comply: X. In return, all he wants is the Crest on Birdman's helmet. Birdman agrees to the deal. Phil brings Doggie Daddy into the office, having broken him. Now, he is nothing but a mindless dog. X comes to collect the Crest, and when Harvey is about to surrender it, Peanut comes in with Metallo, his new villain friend. Harvey proceeds to blast X out. Everyone laughs.
| 18 | "Gone Efficien…t" | June 13, 2004 | 625-018 |
To generate more money Phil hires an efficiency expert named Dvd (formerly David; he took out the vowels to save time, which Phil regards as brllnt). A new regime of efficiency is sweeping Sebben & Sebben, and one of its major parts is to keep only the top three earners. Harvey has to keep up with the new policy to keep his job, and watches as Phil dismantles his office. Dvd fires Harvey's secretary Debbie, replacing her with a PDA the Supercalifragilisticexpiefficaceous. Harvey cannot figure it out, but X, who's waiting outside to kill him, manages to work it fine. He's sent off to search for Yakky Doodle. Meanwhile, the efficiency changes are getting worse. Visitors to the men's room can only use one sheet of toilet paper, and Harvey's office has been sublet to a Greek restaurant, which Harvey must work at along with his legal duties. X finds Yakky, who wants to change both his names. Reducto opposes the idea, though not even he knows why. The case goes to court, and the guy before Harvey takes an unbelievably long time. He has to wait to the next day to start the case. Peanut tells Harvey he needs to work at the restaurant, and that he should have plenty of time while he copies the form he forgot to bring with him. At the restaurant, Harvey "accidentally" gives Dvd Ouzo instead of water, and Dvd gets completely bombed, shouting amongst a crowd of people "Who's got efficient nipples?!" In the meantime, and for no apparent reason, the court orders Yakky to undergo chemical castration, which he takes as his new name.
| 19 | "Droopy Botox" | July 18, 2004 | 625-019 |
Droopy Dog is suing his plastic surgeon for malpractice after he received an overdose of botox that has left his face essentially frozen. Though the case seems open and shut, Harvey produces an indemnity waiver signed by Droopy and wins the case. The surgeon is overjoyed and gives Harvey a surgery coupon catalog. Phil and everyone else around the office give Harvey their highest praises, but the gratitude is lost on him and he still feels guilty at Droopy's unfair loss and remaining predicament, especially after he sees the dog crying and the image sticks with him. Harvey is promoted to vice president of Sebben & Sebben and is given numerous executive privileges; his coupons are doled out by Phil, whose recent LASIK has left him with a second eyepatch, blinding him. X is mistaken for the interior decorator Phil hired to spruce up Harvey's office and redoes it as a huge deathtrap. Harvey tries to solve his guilt by sending Droopy a fruit basket, which he cannot eat as his jaw is frozen. X breaks into Harvey's apartment and creates another danger area. Harvey receives his huge pay and sends it to Droopy, who can actually use it this time. X sends Harvey an invoice for all his redecoration, demanding either 1 million dollars or his crest. He tries to pay with his new raise, but then he remembers he is sent it all to Droopy. He decides against his crest and sends X the remaining coupons, which he takes as a message that Harvey thinks he's ugly. Desperate for approval, he sets out to use the coupons. The surgeon has another malpractice case for Harvey, but Harvey strongly declines him and decides to resign to keep his self-respect. Harvey heads to Phil's office to announce his decision and finds a huge surprise party Phil has thrown to celebrate all of their operations. X runs in seeking Harvey's opinion on his new surgery, which X doesn't know has not changed his face at all. Even Droopy is happy now that he has so much money. Harvey is repulsed by his co-workers' ideals of false beauty, but no one cares.
| 20 | "Guitar Control" | November 2, 2004 | 625-020 |
Quick Draw McGraw attempts to bring in the Dalton Gang (who are wanted for card cheating, cattle rustling, and running a crystal meth lab). After a shoot-out, Quick Draw pulls out his trade mark guitar, only to be arrested for carrying a concealed weapon. Meanwhile, Phil Ken Sebben announces that he is running for president and shows Harvey a check signed for $12,000,000,000 (signed by Yngwie Malmsteen) and The Guitar Lobby's support. Harvey is requested by Baba Looey to defend Quick Draw, which he accepts. In the middle of the first session of the trial, Mentok the Mindtaker remembers that he is to attend his nephew's birthday party and takes Harvey and Quick Draw with him. Afterwards, the trial proceeds with Hiram Mightor as judge (whom Myron Reducto suggests is being bribed by The Guitar Lobby). After a trial filled with the general topics involved with weapon rights, Hiram Mightor spits out a miniature version of Yngwie Malmsteen (who is seen later sitting with The Guitar Lobby). Meanwhile, Peanut and Baba Looey are seen browsing through Quick Draw's guitar collection and Peanut hits and kills Baba Looey with one. At the end Quick Draw is announced not guilty. There is a celebration for Harvey winning the case and Phil losing the election, at which Peanut fires off Quick Draw's pistol at random and watches as it ricochets around the office. Notes: Quick Draw parodies Charlton Heston, who was president of the NRA from 2000–03, by using his type voice in this episode and even saying many of Heston's lines from Planet of the Apes and Ben-Hur.; A tank can be seen destroying a Smurf house.; On its premiere date, Adult Swim ran a marathon of this episode all through the night. The episode replayed 24 times to celebrate Election Day.

=== Season 3 (2005) ===
| No. | Title | Original release date |
|---|---|---|
| 21 | "Booty Noir" | July 24, 2005 |
In a satire of erotic anthologies like Red Shoe Diaries, Phil reads a letter from Reducto detailing his affair with Norlissa, the curvaceous ex-girlfriend of Black Vulcan. She is possessed of enormous buttocks, and when Reducto finds himself unwilling to shrink it, and even begins to expand it, he falls into a state of existential angst. Meanwhile, Birdman is made a bounty hunter so he can apprehend and represent Wally Gator, a volatile redneck. Reducto progressively enlarges Norlissa's butt as they draw closer together. It is revealed that Reducto is a virgin, though he is broken of it by Norlissa during an awkward love scene. They are eventually confronted by Black Vulcan the morning after and engage in a threesome relationship. The Wally Gator case draws to a close with Wally being found guilty of poaching manatees, and he is sentenced to mud-wrestle Harvey, an Abraham Lincoln impersonator and two bikini models, while Phil plays the bongos at a Cha-cha club.
| 22 | "Harvey's Civvy" | July 31, 2005 |
In the opening, Murro the Marauder is fighting Birdman and Avenger. They defeat him, and fly away, not realizing that he has been paralyzed from the waist down. Decades later, Murro sues Birdman. Birdman needs a good lawyer, but somehow ends up with Potamus, who is more interested in making out with the female staff than working on Birdman's case. In court, Murro's lawyer Shado uses his "brain-thievery" to influence the jury. His villainous witnesses testify that Birdman had no reason to attack them; Shado also uses his brain-thievery to prevent Potamus from cross-examining them. Shado contends that his brain-thievery is fundamentally different from Mentok's "mind-taking", however the two get into frequent one-up-manship contests over their skills. Finally Mentok, tiring of the upstart Shado, delves into his mind and takes away an important fact: Shado failed to respond to a discovery motion filed by Potamus. Mentok hypnotizes Potamus to ask Shado "did you get that thing I sent you?". When Shado answers that he did, and failed to respond, Mentok declares a mistrial.
| 23 | "X Gets the Crest" | August 7, 2005 |
X wins Birdman's Crest in a game of poker (Peanut sarcastically calls it gin rummy to an inexperienced Harvey). He cannot collect his million dollar commission, however, as F.E.A.R. moved its headquarters and left no forwarding address. Meanwhile, Birdman falls deeper and deeper into defeatism. He takes on Ricochet Rabbit's case against the town of Hoop'n'Holler after Ricochet destroyed half the town on one of his hyperactive outbursts. The town wants Ricochet's badge and Harvey agrees to help. The case goes badly, with Harvey's self-esteem at a low ebb and Ricochet Rabbit destroying half the courtroom, with Reducto accounting for most of the other half trying to shrink him. Mentok rules that Ricochet Rabbit has ADD, ADHD and OPP (which stands for "Other People's Problems", and is not a disease), and court-orders Ricochet to be medicated with rabbit Ritalin. The Crest takes over X's mind, causing him to become a hero. In the end, Harvey tricks X into returning his Crest by trading him a shinier (but useless) one.
| 24 | "Bird Girl of Guantanamole" | August 14, 2005 |
It's 'Take Phil's Daughter to Work Day', so naturally Phil brings his daughter, Judy. Harvey agrees to defend Morocco Mole, who has been detained as a terrorist for two years after being discovered in the Middle East. While defending Morocco, Harvey also has to deal with being bothered by Birdgirl, who has a striking resemblance to Judy Sebben. Birdgirl in turn has to fend off the advances of Phil, who continually sexually harasses her, oblivious to her true identity. Harvey also has to go to a hospital because Ernie Devlin seeks a will. Notes: The episode title is a reference to the Birdman of Alcatraz and the detention of prisoners in Guantanamo Bay.
| 25 | "Turner Classic Birdman" | August 21, 2005 |
Notes: The short was introduced by Robert Osborne of Turner Classic Movies, which is the network this episode's title is a reference to.
| 26 | "Beyond the Valley of the Dinosaurs" | August 28, 2005 |
Potamus invites Harvey to relax in his new hot tub, wearing a pink shower terry that Potamus has told him to put on. Potamus instructs Harvey to "hit the jets" on the tub and when Harvey does so he is enveloped in a blue light and sucked into the swirling waters of the tub. Potamus follows Harvey, trying to retrieve his hoagie. Harvey and Potamus rematerialize in what appears to be the Stone Age. Harvey attempts to call Peanut (who seems to be hosting a Lamaze class in Potamus' office) but cannot get a clear enough signal on his phone. Harvey is caught by neanderthal cave men who believe that he is the "pink manbird" (because of the shower terry) their oracle foretold would bring pestilence and drought. When Potamus appears they mistake him for their pink hippo helmet-wearing God, which Potamus gladly embraces. Phil finds out about the portal in the hot tub and brings Peanut, Avenger, and a Star Trek character parody to the past. Phil takes advantage of the limitless resources and lack of economy to start up several business ventures including theme parks and dinosaur hunting. Meanwhile, Harvey serves council to a cavewoman who wants to leave her husband for another (exact duplicate-looking) caveman, while Potamus serves as judge. Harvey convinces Potamus not to sacrifice the woman (as the other cavemen demand) but to give her and her husband marriage counseling – Phil tries to volunteer for it but Harvey decides to do it himself. Phil eventually angers the cavemen and Potamus is discovered to be a sham so they all rush back to the watery portal. However, the neanderthals and their dinosaurs follow them to the present. They all laugh and the Star Trek parody gets eaten by a T-Rex. Notes: The title of this episode is a cross between Beyond the Valley of the Dolls and Valley of the Dinosaurs.
| 27 | "Evolutionary War" | September 4, 2005 |
The school that Cavey Junior is attending refuses to teach evolution, claiming that it is just a myth, so his father (Captain Caveman) takes legal action, through Harvey Birdman. Peanut is sent to help prove evolution, but ends up spending all his time at a local strip club. Harvey has an identity crisis when Reducto asks him where a half man, half bird fits into the process of evolution, which involves him bursting into a Disney style song. The next day at court, Mentok messes with a chiseler who tries to put up a stone tablet of the Ten Commandments in front of the courthouse, and Peanut tells Harvey to call Magilla Gorilla to the stand to prove evolution (a talking ape) but the jury is unsatisfied. When Cavey Junior takes the stand he points out that he read the evolution chapter, not because he wanted to learn and expand his mind, but because the chapter was required for the "federally mandated no child left behind test" necessary to move onto the next grade. Mentok declares, after pranking the courtroom, that the school can teach whatever they want, and that Cavey Junior is merely a theory, not a real child. Over the course of the episode, Phil was battling the cave men and dinosaurs who were still roaming the streets from the previous episode. He joins Harvey at the end and gets himself a drink from a vending machine (with a frozen Flintstone family inside). Notes: The episode title is a play on "Evolution" and the "Revolutionary War".
| 28 | "Free Magilla" | September 11, 2005 |
Magilla Gorilla gets "freed" from Mr. Peebles' pet shop by the People's Animals Freedom Front. Mr. Peebles comes to Harvey Birdman to get Magilla back. Also, Phil Ken Sebben takes Peter Potamus (and his three nephews Stuey, Fuey and Spuey, a parody of Huey, Dewey, and Louie) along for an employee retreat, where Peter Potamus spends most of his time choking on a plastic beer can holder and Phil randomly blows stuff up and doesn't pay attention to Peter Potamus at all. Members of the People's Animals Freedom Front attack Harvey's office because they don't approve of him "owning" Avenger. Eventually, PAFF get sick of Magilla Gorilla's puns and they abandon him in a forest. In court (in front of an off-screen judge) Harvey tries to defend himself and Mr. Peebles against accusations of animal abuse but the radical activists will not be swayed. Eventually Avenger finds and brings back Magilla who wants to go back to living with Mr. Peebles.
| 29 | "Return of Birdgirl" | September 18, 2005 |
Birdgirl brings to Harvey's attention a case where Dr. Quest and Race Bannon want to have a legal gay marriage (though not actually having a relationship) to protect the boys. At the office, Birdgirl continues to be hit on by Phil and she reluctantly goes on a date with him lest he figure out she's actually his daughter. Mentok informs Harvey and his clients that he doesn't have the authority to try the case; they must argue it before the Justices League – a group of seven robed super-judges (a humorous reference to both the Supreme Court of the United States and the Justice League). Birdgirl assists Harvey with the case in between forced dates with Phil and eventually Phil proposes to her, much to Birdgirl's horror. Phil condemns the idea of marriage between Dr. Quest and Race and out of her Birdgirl costume, Judy tries to keep her father from going through with the marriage by claiming Birdgirl is interested in Birdman. There's a quick fight and an injured Harvey Birdman goes before the Justices to hear the verdict… which never comes because they're called to action via telecommunicator. Afterward, Birdman interrupts the Sebben wedding and finally tells Phil that Birdgirl is his daughter but Phil still doesn't believe him. He does however call off the wedding when he inadvertently falls for Judy's Aunt Phyllis (his sister, a blonde busty woman with the exact same face, including mustache and eye-patch, as Phil).
| 30 | "Mindless" | September 25, 2005 |
Peanut spots an abrasion on Harvey's neck from a cat scratch from Benny who enters and reports Top Cat's arrest for "being a cat". Harvey gets Top Cat released but he is soon back in jail for illegal gambling in Harvey's house which Harvey is implicated in. Meanwhile, Mentok has a personal crisis in court and swaps a dog's mind for Spyro's; he loses track of Spyro's mind and is forced to look after Spyro until he finds his mind. Mentok rules that Harvey and the cats should serve time in remand but is forced to rule on the case when he needs Harvey to babysit Spyro. Mentok rules that Harvey and the cats have served their time in jail, but that they should be put on probation.
| 31 | "Sebben and Sebben Employee Orientation" | October 16, 2005 |
The episode is presented as an orientation film for new Sebben & Sebben employees. Much of the time is spent on Phil's youth, where he is pictured as constantly engaging in activities hazardous to his left eye (though he does not actually lose it until he becomes an office worker). Various characters in the series perform their typical activities: Peter Potamus demonstrates the firm's incredibly complicated system for "sending things"; Peanut demonstrates unethical behavior; Elliott the Deadly Duplicator provides employees with two of everything, except for staplers (an oversight). Notes: The episode seems to be a spoof of the Orientation given to new employees of Ted Turner, as suggested in the voice commentary for "Blackwatch Plaid".; Throughout the episode, random scenes from an infomercial for a juicer appear.; Based on Phil Ken Sebben's dialogue, the video (or at least one scene of it) was filmed in the year 1985.
| 32 | "Identity Theft" | October 23, 2005 |
"Chemical Castration" (né Yakky Doodle; see "Gone Efficien…t" above) wants his old name back, which requires photocopying paper work. So Harvey Birdman goes to Duplication Services but he unwittingly insults the employee by getting his name wrong (mispronouncing "Elliott" as "Eliot" ["ee-lee-ought"]). Despite the fact the name was spelled wrongly on his name tag, Elliott swears revenge and starts creating "copies" of Harvey. These copies are not photocopies but rather whole humans, apparently clones, that share Harvey's personality and knowledge. Unfortunately they get along, so he starts copying Phil Ken Sebben, who starts hunting Birdmans to thin the herds. Elliott then loses all control and make copies of everyone. Elliott only stops when he runs out of toner; the copies are subsequently shredded. Notes: The episode is a satire of how many classic Hanna-Barbera cartoons are rip-offs of one another (e.g. Scooby-Doo, Jabberjaw and Speed Buggy are all mystery-solving cartoons involving objects/animals as focal characters who can talk, and how certain members of each mystery solving team look like each other, like Shaggy, Clamhead and Mr. Tinker) and how animation styles done by different people looked very different (e.g. different looking Ranger Smiths on Yogi Bear).; Sebben's final words before he is put through the shredder are a parody of the last words of Roy Batty, a character played by Rutger Hauer in the 1982 film Blade Runner.

=== Season 4 (2006–07) ===
| No. | Title | Original release date |
|---|---|---|
| 33 | "Shazzan" "Mufti Trouble" | October 1, 2006 |
Avenger inexplicably starts talking. Peanut discovers a vase that, when rubbed, releases Shazzan, now in servitude to Peanut. Shazzan accuses Mentok of having imprisoned him in the vase centuries ago for gazing on the king's intended. Mentok was a genie called Mufti the Mizwa of Muzzy Tah in those days, one of several identities he has had over the years. Shazzan insists on Peanut representing him, and Mentok, after he is captured, manipulates Harvey into representing him. Mentok insists that Shazzan is attempting to frame him, and escapes from court to retrieve the halves of a magic disk that, when put back together and the magic word thus revealed is spoken (by Avenger), imprisons Shazzan in the vase again. Notes: Mentok's attempt to escape from his prison by putting on Harvey's mask is based on Hannibal's escape on The Silence of the Lambs.; The Rebus-type puzzle that appears when Mentok references the magic word is "That Thing I Sent You", with "You" pronounced "Cha".
| 34 | "Incredible Hippo" | October 8, 2006 |
Peter Potamus consumes radioactive pellets that transform him into "the creature", turning him green and tripling his waist size. Meanwhile, Atom Ant is charged with having high radiation levels in his home. Trivia: When Phil mentioned about foreshadowing the "Dead" part (during the scene were Phil claimed that he was "Dead Wrong" about Pete Potomus), he's likely referring to his own death in the following episode when he gets hit by a bus.
| 35 | "Babysitter" | October 15, 2006 |
Peter Potamus takes over Sebben & Sebben in Phil's absence. Reducto babysits Peanut on his birthday. Birdgirl/Judy is searching for her father Phil. Birdman goes to his high school reunion. While running across an intersection after Peanut's party, Reducto is hit by a clown-car and killed. Trivia: Phil has packed up his office because he is leaving the firm and when he is taking the elevator which is packed with his items and Harvey's suitcases and other characters, you can see Stephen Colbert squeezed into the elevator with them all.; When Phil gets hit by the bus, and near the very end of the episode, the bus that hits Phil and almost hits Reducto has a billboard that says "Watch the Colbert Report" with a drawing of an eagle with headphones on. The eagle is the main symbol of The Colbert Report.; When Phil is about to leave, he talks about starting his own law firm ("or spin off, if you will"), and how it will have a big S-shaped desk perfect for interviews, and that he would be far too busy to regularly appear, but that he will still be a contributor, or a senior correspondent ("… in law"). These are references to Stephen Colbert (the actor who voices Phil and Reducto) getting his own Daily Show spin-off, The Colbert Report.; At the part when Harvey says "Phil's dead 10 minutes" is right at the 10-minute mark on the DVD
| 36 | "Birdnapped" | October 22, 2006 |
Harvey takes over for the recently deceased Phil, performing paper work and firings. At the same time, X the Eliminator is busy planning the perfect supper date with Harvey….who has yet to be invited. Finding out that Harvey is too busy to make time for an appointment, X the Eliminator sets out to kidnap Birdgirl to lure Harvey to his apartment. As well as, the reading of Phil Ken Sebben's will is read by none other than Bill Ken Sebben, Phil's twin, who was first referenced in "Sebben and Sebben Employee Orientation". After the end credits, a junkyard worker is "compacting, not cremating" what one could presume to be Reducto's remains, evidenced by wreaths and attended by Inch High. Trivia: When Bill first appears and everyone mistakes him for Phil (everyone shouts out a variation of "Phil's back"), someone shouts out "Stephen's back", a reference to Phil's voice-artist, Stephen Colbert, leaving the show to work on his own show, The Colbert Report.
| 37 | "Grodin" | October 29, 2006 |
Bobby files yet another lawsuit on Ernie Devlin after choking on a defective toy marketed by Devlin. X the Eliminator seeks outside assistance to make him more evil.
| 38 | "Juror in Court" | July 15, 2007 |
After trying to stall time from a case by saying a juror has been selected numerous times for his case, Harvey is forced to perform jury duty. Mentok orders The Deadly Duplicator to make a copy of Harvey, and two of them both perform their tasks. After Harvey wins the case, Mentok notices the rest of the jurors have been selected for all of Harvey's cases over and over again, and forces a do-over of all of Harvey's previous cases. Trivia: There was no explanation on what happened to Harvey's double in this episode, which could mean that Harvey Birdman is possibly still alive.
| 39 | "The Death of Harvey Birdman" | July 22, 2007 |
In a continuation of the previous episode, Harvey is forced to retry all of his cases because of a mishap with the jury. After thinking that Harvey has retried every case within the limited amount of time Mentok gives him, Birdgirl spots another person that hasn't been tried yet. It is revealed that the "person" is Nitron, Harvey's first client. He unleashes havoc on the city along with DefCon-12, and the Birdteam set out to stop them. Birdgirl wraps rope around DefCon 12's legs as Peanut knocks him down with an I-beam, Birdgirl tells Peter Potamus that DefCon 12 got that thing he sent him but never told him about it, Potamus outrages and takes DefCon down, Harvey defeats Nitron and saves the city, but is then run over by Phil Ken Sebben and killed. Trivia: On an island, a bus driver has his bus parked in the rain, and an arm, a leg, and a lobster appears from the bottom of the windshield wiper. Finally, Phil Ken Sebben appears and laughs "HA HA HA! Final episode stunt casting!", which is referring to Stephen Colbert's brief leave to work on his show, The Colbert Report, and coming back for the final episode to voice his character again.; This was a 30-minute episode, more than double the running time of other episodes. This was the first (and only) episode that ran for 30 minutes.

=== Special (2018) ===
| Title | Original release date | U.S. viewers (millions) |
|---|---|---|
| Harvey Birdman: Attorney General | October 12, 2018 (online); October 14, 2018 (television) | 0.566 (TV debut) |
Harvey Birdman is appointed Assistant Attorney General and attempts to have now-President Phil Ken Sebben removed from office on his request. Trivia: Harvey Birdman is revived, following his death in the series finale.
