= Birdman and the Galaxy Trio =

American animated TV series (1967–1968)

- Also known as: Birdman; The Galaxy Trio
- Genre: Superhero
- Created by: Alex Toth
- Written by: Neal Barbera; Phil Hahn; Jack Hanrahan
- Directed by: Joseph Barbera; William Hanna
- Voices of: Keith Andes; Don Messick; John Stephenson; Ted Cassidy; Virginia Eiler
- Theme music composer: Ted Nichols
- Opening theme: Ted Nichols; Keith Andes
- Composer: Ted Nichols
- Country of origin: United States
- Original language: English
- No. of seasons: 1
- No. of episodes: 20

Production
- Running time: 30 minutes
- Production company: Hanna-Barbera Productions

Original release
- Network: NBC
- Release: September 9, 1967 – January 20, 1968

Related
- Harvey Birdman, Attorney at Law

Birdman and the Galaxy Trio, or simply Birdman or The Galaxy Trio, is an American animated television series produced by Hanna-Barbera Productions that debuted on NBC on September 9, 1967, and ran on Saturday mornings until January 20, 1968. The program consists of two segments: Birdman, depicting the adventures of a winged superhero (created by Alex Toth, creator of Space Ghost) powered by the sun, and The Galaxy Trio, centered around the adventures of a patrol of interstellar superheroes. Each segment was a complete independent story, and the characters of each segment did not interact with those of the other, except for a bumper that has all four heroes defeating a prehistoric monster.

== Segments ==
=== Birdman ===
Birdman (voiced by Keith Andes) is an ordinary human who has been endowed by the sun god Ra with the ability to shoot solar rays from his fists and project quasi-solid "solar shields" to defend himself against attacks (Birdman's origin is only vaguely, and only briefly, hinted at during the series. His real name is there given as Raymond "Ray" Randall). After he had acquired his avian—and other—powers, he was recruited by a top-secret government agency, Inter-Nation Security, and now works full-time fighting crime, assisted by his pet eagle, who responds to the name of Avenger. In addition to the abilities he received from Ra, Birdman also possesses the power of flight, thanks to the giant wings which sprout from his back. It is possible Birdman is fireproof; being forced into an incinerator recharged rather than hurt him. His sole weakness is that he has to recharge his superhuman powers periodically, through exposure either to the sun's rays or to a comparable source of heat and/or light such as a desk lamp (when he was once shrunken to insect proportions) or the aforementioned incinerator, a weakness that is exposed in nearly every episode. His trademark is his battle cry of "Biiiiirdman!!!" whenever he goes into battle.

He is assisted by his supporting characters:

- Falcon 7 (voiced by Don Messick) – Birdman's eye patch-wearing contact with Inter-Nation Security, and the person from whom Birdman typically receives his missions.
- Birdboy (voiced by Dick Beals) – A sidekick for Birdman. The two first met when Birdman happened upon a shipwreck, of which Birdboy was the only apparent survivor. Since the boy was near death from exposure, Birdman transferred some of his own super energy to him, reviving him and giving powers similar to Birdman's, and he went on to aid him in several episodes. Birdboy lacks the natural feathered wings sported by Birdman, however, and is only able to fly with the assistance of the mechanical wings strapped to his back. He spends much of his time searching for his father, who was lost in the wreck, but this is never resolved.
- General Stone (voiced by Don Messick) – General Stone appears several times in Birdman with other military leaders, and tends to find himself on the receiving end of the villains' schemes.

Birdman has fought the sinister organization F.E.A.R. that is led by Number One (voiced by John Stephenson) and Birdman's "number one" enemy. F.E.A.R. is behind many plots over the course of the series, frequently employing supervillains to perform nefarious tasks. The organization was seemingly defeated for good and its leader arrested in "The Wings of F.E.A.R.", but it occasionally resurfaced without any explanation.

Birdman has also fought some other villains with some of them appearing either having one appearance or having more than one appearance. They consist of:

- Dr. Millennium (voiced by Hal Smith) - A supervillain who appeared in "The Menace of Dr. Millennium", using a time-manipulating machine to commit crimes. He returned in "The Revenge of Dr. Millennium" where he tried to exact his revenge on Birdman and take over the world from the past.
- X the Eliminator (voiced by John Stephenson) - A mercenary hired by F.E.A.R. to eliminate Birdman. He is charged with bringing back Birdman's crest from his helmet as proof of his accomplishment.
- The Ruthless Ringmaster (voiced by Vic Perrin) - An agent of F.E.A.R.
- Morto the Marauder (voiced by Vic Perrin) - A criminal genius and evidently once a significant threat to the world, Morto twice escaped from prison with his mechanical know-how and wreaked havoc in "Morto the Marauder" and "Morto Rides Again".
- Cumulus the Storm King (voiced by Henry Corden) - A supervillain who can control the weather.
- Nitron the Human Bomb (voiced by Barney Phillips) - A scientist who got the capabilities and powers of a chemical called NITRON. He is eager to join F.E.A.R, for which Number One tells him to finish the atomic reactor USS-CO-BOLT and Birdman, but fails.
- The Mummer - A supervillain who is a master of disguise. Unlike most of Birdman's enemies, the Mummer was able to escape from him thanks to his disguises making him one of a few villains to get away.
- Kiroff - A supervillain who was responsible for causing worldwide earthquakes.
- Zardo - A supervillain who at one time captured Avenger. He received a complete redesign in Harvey Birdman, Attorney at Law.
- The Constrictor - Dressed like a snake and has two boa constrictors as his pets, this supervillain captures Avenger and tries to use him in order to capture Birdman. Birdman finds Avenger and burns Constrictor's headquarters down. Constrictor realizes Birdman is too powerful to be defeated and manages to escape. Birdman never caught the Constrictor, making him one of a few villains to get away.
- Reducto (voiced by John Stephenson): A supervillain who wields a shrink ray. He uses this ray to demand money from Central City or he will shrink it. After being defeated by Birdman, he is shrunken down to microscopic size.
- Doctor Shark - A supervillain who fought Birdman underwater and had the face of a shark, but the body of a man. Birdman had to constantly regain his strength by battling Doctor Shark in small increments so that he did not lose his energy from being away from the sun. Doctor Shark was eventually defeated.
- Hannibal the Hunter - A big game hunter who is determined to hunt down Birdman.
- Mentor the Mind-Taker (voiced by Don Messick) - Mentor has the ability to send cerebral messages to a person or animal to do his bidding. He uses this ability to get Birdman to steal missiles from the United States government. He plans on using these missiles to start a war between two countries. He was renamed Mentok when he appeared in Harvey Birdman, Attorney at Law. The name change was also carried over to the Hanna-Barbera Beyond comics.
- Dr. Freezoid - Dr. Freezoid has a weapon that can turn an entire city block into ice. He has a retreat at the North Pole. Birdman causes him to self-destruct his base of operations with his own weapons trapping Dr. Freezoid inside.
- The Duplicator (voiced by Frank Gerstle) - An old man with large glasses, the Deadly Duplicator uses his glasses to create duplicates of the people that he zaps. The Deadly Duplicator has full control over the twin and uses them to help him in his plans to take over the world, but of course is thwarted by Birdman.
- Professor Nightshade (voiced by Henry Corden) - An agent of F.E.A.R., he steals a solar box that has the power to send entire cities into the fourth dimension. Professor Nightshade traps Birdman and tries to use the solar box on him, but it reacts to Birdman differently: instead of sending Birdman into the fourth dimension, it gives him energy to become strong. When Prof. Nightshade tries to use it again on him, it reflects off of Birdman and Nightshade accidentally sends himself into the fourth dimension. Birdman then destroys the machine.
- The Chameleon - A scientist who created a transformation serum that gave him the ability to shapeshift into whatever he wants, whether it's people, animals, or even inanimate objects. In the end, the serum in his body ran out and Birdman handed him over to the police.
- Captain Moray of the Deep (voiced by Paul Frees) - Captain Moray abducts his seventh scientist. He forces them to develop a nuclear reactor. Birdman disguises himself as a scientist and gets abducted by Moray, but Moray knew it was him and a great battle ensues. Birdman is then captured for real. He sends a signal to Birdboy to find him. As Birdman is about to enter a nuclear reactor (which should have killed him), his energy is instead restored enabling him to end the villainy of Captain Moray as Birdman hands him over to the Navy.
- The Aliens of the Purple Moss - These were aliens who came to Earth to take it over. Fortunately, Birdman was informed and stopped the aliens in a heated battle.
- The Brain Thief (voiced by Don Messick) - A mad scientist named Doctor Shado captures four other scientists and tries to steal the information in their minds.
- Dr. Mentaur - A scientist who turned a woman into Birdgirl through hypnosis, a super serum, and some metal wings. Eventually, he was defeated and Birdgirl became normal again.
  - Birdgirl - Created by Dr. Mentaur through hypnosis, a super serum and some metal wings. She was an aerialist before she met Dr. Mentaur. While under hypnosis, she was used to defeat Birdman. While captured, Birdman tricked her into letting him go outside as a last request. Regaining his strength from the sun, this allowed Birdman to defeat Dr. Mentaur and save Birdgirl.
- The Magnatroid - This was a robot created by a scientist to destroy Birdman.
- Medusa (voiced by June Foray) a.k.a. "the Empress of Evil" - Medusa captures the Prince of the Maja Raja and then captures Birdman. The Prince gives Birdman a diamond from his turban that he says came from the sun god, Ra. After giving it to Birdman, Birdman is able to regain his strength and defeat Medusa. She throws herself into a pit of demons to elude him.
- Spyro - Head of a master spy syndicate, he hijacked the atomic city supply train to do some evil bidding.
- Dr. Claw - A scientist that used an ant serum to inject into his creation, the Ant Ape. When he injects his robot creation, the Ant Ape becomes super-strong and nearly unstoppable, but Birdman defeats them.
- The Speed Demon - A convicted felon already put away by Birdman retaliates by creating a potion that gives him super-speed. He runs around stealing money and jewels from various places. He then realizes that with his new power, he cannot be defeated. Speed Demon captures Birdman and almost defeats him, but Birman comes out on top. In the end, Speed Demon's speed causes his aging process to speed up rapidly while evading a missile and he becomes an old man, losing the battle.
- Vulturo (voiced by Vic Perrin) - Dr. Vult is an evil scientist who made a vulture-like costume to combat Birdman. He first appeared in "Vulturo, Prince of Darkness" where he was hired by F.E.A.R. to destroy Birdman. In "The Return of Vulturo", Vulturo tried to exact his revenge that involved kidnapping Birdboy.
- The Barracuda - A supervillain who plans on using torpedoes and submarines to loot ships and to start wars between countries.
- Murro (sic) the Marauder: (voiced by Hal Smith) This evil villain can commandeer the shadows of unsuspecting victims. Although the episode title card identifies the character as Murro, he is referred to as "Murko" throughout the segment.

=== Galaxy Trio ===
The Galaxy Trio is a group of three extraterrestrial superheroes, Vapor Man, Meteor Man, and Gravity Girl, who patrol space in their cruiser Condor One. They maintain order and fight evildoers in the name of the Galactic Patrol law enforcement agency. The ship was equipped with a "displacer", that is, a teleportation device.

- Vapor Man (voiced by Don Messick) – He has the ability to transform part or all of his body into gaseous form (a power shared by at least some residents of his home planet of Vaporus), enabling him to fly, escape from physical bonds, and squeeze through very small spaces, as well as producing various forms of "vapor" (such as "freeze vapor") from his hands.
- Meteor Man (voiced by Ted Cassidy) – A native of the planet Meteorus. Meteor Man is distinguished by his ability to increase or decrease the size of any part of his body. He gains superhuman strength in any limb that he chooses to enlarge.
- Gravity Girl (voiced by Virginia Eiler) – She has the ability to bend the laws of gravity to her will, allowing her to fly and lift very heavy objects with her mind. The daughter of the king of the planet Gravitas, she left her luxurious home and life of privilege at an early age to fight crime with the Galactic Patrol and was subsequently assigned to the Galaxy Trio team, with whom she has served ever since.

The Galaxy Trio get their missions from a man named the Chief.

The Galaxy Trio faces off against an assortment of villains, with some of them appearing more than once:

- Computron - A robot from Orbus 4 that plotted to take control of it.
- Lotar - The twin brother of Neptar on the planet Aqueus who conspires to take his brother's throne.

== Episodes ==
Each episode featured two Birdman segments with one Galaxy Trio segment between them.

No.	Titles	Original release date
1	"X the Eliminator / Revolt of the Robots / Morto the Marauder"	September 9, 1967
X the Eliminator: F.E.A.R. offers 1 million dollars for the crest of Birdman's helmet. Determined to get rid of Birdman forever, X the Eliminator causes an Earth-to-Mars cargo van to go down at sea, and when Birdman investigates, paralyzes him with a vice-gun and throws him in a dark pit. Birdman calls to Avenger to free him, and they fly against X's missiles in a mid-air battle to shoot him down.; Revolt of the Robots: The Galaxy Trio, responding to an SOS from Orbus 4 – where the servant robots, led by Computron, have revolted against the people – help Kalex, their ruler, get at the power centers of the robots to render them harmless. After Gravity Girl makes Computron too light to pull the switch which would destroy them all, Kalex keeps it in mind that only people should rule people.; Morto the Marauder: Escaping from captivity, the evil Morto mobilizes a mechanical "knight of evil" to devastate the country and draw Birdman into an all out confrontation. A time for a duel is set, and they meet, but instead of making it a fair fight, Birdman's adversary sends two mechanical knights with specialized powers to weaken Birdman and then blocks out the sun to further diminish his chances. Thinking himself victorious, Morto throws a steel net over Birdman, but Avenger arranges a way to recharge Birdman's strength; together they put Morto into the hands of the authorities.
2	"The Ruthless Ringmaster / The Battle of the Aquatrons / Birdman Versus the Mummer"	September 16, 1967
The Ruthless Ringmaster: The Ringmaster steals the governments' three most advanced weapons—a flying tank, a laser cannon, and the new ultra-serum. He fiendishly decides to use these against Birdman and Avenger, but finds out that their powers are much stronger. As they close in on him, he accidentally sets off an avalanche, which buries him.; The Battle of the Aquatrons: Lotar, who has taken over the planet Aqueus, directs powerful heat rays at Earth to melt the ice caps and cover the planet with water so he can start a new colony. The Galaxy Trio restore his brother, Neptar, to the throne by showing the people that Lotar cares only for power and nothing about them.; Birdman Versus the Mummer: An imposter at a peace conference purposely stirs up mistrust leading to war between two countries. As bombs begin to fly, Birdman and Avenger catch them in mid-air so that innocent people will not be hurt. Later at a missile-testing-ground exhibit they stop more of the evildoer's mischief, but he loses himself in the crowd of spectators to avoid capture.
3	"The Quake Threat / The Galaxy Trio Versus the Moltens of Meteorus / Avenger for Ransom"	September 23, 1967
The Quake Threat: Birdman tracks Kyrov, who has been engineering earthquakes that terrify and threaten the population, to his fortress-hideout, but the evil genius imprisons him underground to weaken his powers. Avenger cleverly attracts Kyrov's gunfire toward Birdman's cell to make openings that allow the sun's energy to come in, and together they put Kyrov in his own cage.; The Galaxy Trio Versus the Moltens of Meteorus: Moltens, creatures who live beneath the surface of Meteor Man's home planet, Meteorus, are driving the inhabitants off the planet with underground explosions and molten lava. To make peace, Meteor Man helps them find an empty planet where they too can live above the surface.; Avenger for Ransom: Birdman is forced to steal secret plans from the government by a kidnapper named Zardo, who is holding Avenger captive. Evading military gunfire, Birdman manages to turn the tables on the kidnapper, regaining Avenger and the government's trust.
4	"Birdman Versus Cumulus, the Storm King / The Galaxy Trio and the Sleeping Planet / Serpents of the Deep"	September 30, 1967
Birdman Versus Cumulus, the Storm King: Cumulus, who has learned to direct the elements, is attempting to enslave the country with them. Only Birdman and Avenger stand in his way. By purposely striking a dam with a lightning bolt, Cumulus attracts Birdman and then uses a trick fog to take him captive. Avenger rescues Birdman, and together they take away the ill-used toys of Cumulus.; The Galaxy Trio and the Sleeping Planet: When the Galaxy Trio go to Planet K-7, which does not answer its radio call, they find all of the inhabitants in a deep trance while machines go about stealing their valuables. Kragg, the space pirate who has masterminded this, escapes, but not without telling the Galaxy Trio where they can find the antidote to save the planet's people.; Serpents of the Deep: Birdman and Avenger go after the cunning Dr. Shark to retrieve a government gold-extracting bathysphere which is secreted away in the thief's submarine headquarters. Dr. Shark sends his henchmen and sea monsters after them, capturing Birdman as his sun-charged energy fails, but he recharges his power by short-circuiting a sun machine and uses his solar beam and solar shield to get rid of the sea monsters. Short-circuiting the sub's depth stabilizer, he stops radar bombs in order to finally put Dr. Shark to flight.
5	"Nitron the Human Bomb / The Galaxy Trio and the Peril of the Prison Planet / Mentor, the Mind Taker"	October 7, 1967
Nitron the Human Bomb: A turncoat nuclear scientist takes on three destructive tasks given by Number One to gain power in an underground organization F.E.A.R. When he is prevented from accomplishing his first two assignments by Birdman and Falcon 7, he becomes enraged and turns all his force to an all-out attack on Birdman's lair-only to succeed in destroying himself in a radioactive explosion he sets off.; The Galaxy Trio and the Peril of the Prison Planet: The Galaxy Trio's vacation is cut short when they are called to a prison planet where the inmates have taken over. The three criminals try to escape in the Galaxy Trio's rocketship, but since it has been so long since they flew one, they have forgotten how to operate it.; Mentor, the Mind Taker: Mentor first turns Avenger against Birdman by cerebral suggestion and then uses the bird to bring Birdman to him. Birdman frees Avenger from his spell, but falls victim to Mentor's black shield and is forced to turn against his own government. The sun restores Birdman's judgment, and he is free to stop a missile Mentor has aimed to start a world war. Mentor manages to escape as Birdman is occupied with saving humanity.
6	"The Purple Moss / Drackmore, the Despot / The Deadly Trio"	October 14, 1967
The Purple Moss: Fed by rays from a hovering mental sphere, a suffocating purple moss is spreading over the countryside. Birdman must get inside the sphere to confront Xandu, who is scheming to take over the Earth for the planet Moger, but he turns out to be a trick image. Birdman is immobilized by a centrifugal force machine and a strange spray and dumped outside the craft; he recharges his strength and goes after Xandu, neatly arranging to send the enemy out into space in endless orbit, locked there by his own harmful ray.; Drackmore, the Despot: The Trio head into the unexplored Tranquility Belt to find some missing explorers. After letting themselves get captured, they find themselves face to face with Drackmore, self-styled ruler, and master of the planet. The Galaxy Trio defeat Drackmore and set his slaves and prisoners free.; The Deadly Trio: Three supervillains decide to combine their powers to accomplish what each of them has failed to do individually—destroy the invincible Birdman and in so doing, dominate the world. They begin to plunder the city with a free hand, and when Birdman opposes them, they use their force wall, invisible ray, and communications scrambler to have him put behind bars. Birdman uses his captors' own machinery to melt the jail door, restore his sun-energy, and this time overpowers the Deadly Trio with his solar shield and solar beam.
7	"The Brain Thief / Titan, the Titanium Man / Birdman Versus the Constrictor"	October 21, 1967
The Brain Thief: As Birdman and Avenger go after a kidnapper who "dematerializes" scientists and puts their combined knowledge into his evil machine, Birdman is overcome and shot out to sea in a capsule. Avenger hears Birdman's cries for help and rescues him. To capture the Brain Thief they must match their power against a giant replica of Birdman and Avenger, but they easily crush these and set the scientists free.; Titan, the Titanium Man: Titan, who made himself invincible in his plot to conquer the universe, lures the Galaxy Trio to his off-limits planet with fake distress signals. Although the Galaxy Trio defeats his army of super-cybernoids, Titan escapes in a rocketship, free to menace the universe once more.; Birdman Versus the Constrictor: Birdman reluctantly surrenders his golden eagle companion, Avenger, to his enemy the Constrictor, who promises to give up stolen missile plans in return but double-crosses Birdman by taking off with the plans and Avenger. Pursuing, Birdman runs into a radar scanner that releases missiles at him, and a laser ray. He blocks these with his solar shield then enters the schemer's ship and recovers the secret plans and Avenger while the Constrictor flees.
8	"Number One / The Duplitrons / Birdman Meets Birdgirl"	October 28, 1967
Number One: Birdman's number one enemy schemes to steal away his energy for use in a pirate satellite. He traps Birdman in his armored car, saps his energy, and puts him underground. Avenger rescues him, and they battle electric and sonic powers, thus putting an end to Number One.; The Duplitrons: The Galaxy Trio rush to Earth, usually one of the most peaceful planets, to stop the three world leaders from declaring war on each other. Vapor Man and Gravity Girl discover that the leaders are really Duplitrons and so is Meteor Man. They reprogram him to take them to Spectre's hideout where they defeat Spectre and find the real leaders and Meteor Man sleeping peacefully.; Birdman Meets Birdgirl: Birdman's reputation is suddenly challenged by the appearance of Birdgirl, who claims credit for his brave deeds. Birdgirl, a young aerialist whom Mentaur has hypnotized and endowed with mechanical wings and super-strength, is ordered to steal a hydrogen bomb from the government. Going after her, Birdman is knocked down and locked in a dark cell, but he arouses Birdgirl's sympathy and she lets him out into the sunlight, which restores his strength. As they battle again, Mentaur is finished off by a shell which Birdman deflects back at him.
9	"Birdman Meets Reducto / Computron Lives / Vulturo, Prince of Darkness"	November 4, 1967
Birdman Meets Reducto: Reducto threatens to shrink the country to the size of a matchbox unless he is given ultimate power. In an attack on the powerful shrink-machine, Birdman damages it but is reduced to the size of insect bait. Attacked by ants, spiders, and flies, he calls to Avenger for help, who uses a magnifying glass to direct the sun's rays to Birdman, and then Birdman blows himself up to proper size again. They destroy the machine, accidentally reducing Reducto to microscopic size, never to be heard from again.; Computron Lives: Computron refuses to obey the soldiers who have reactivated him in their hopes of controlling Orbus 4; he heads for the abandoned planet Z-10 where he reactivates war machines. In their battle with Computron, the Galaxy Trio hit him with a ray which brings him to life, and makes him repent his ways.; Vulturo, Prince of Darkness: Birdman's sinister foe Vulturo suddenly appears at an astronomic conference and threatens the whole assembly unless Birdman agrees to meet him in a duel that will match Birdman's superpowers against the awesome powers that Vulturo has devised. He even has a match for Avenger, a mechanical bird called Dirth. Fighting off each attack, Birdman's powers begin to fade; he flies evasively, but finds out that the lives of the scientists at the conference are under threat of a time-bomb. Given back some strength by a passing comet, Birdman rushes to the scientists, as Vulturo escapes.
10	"The Chameleon / The Eye of Time / The Incredible Magnatroid"	November 11, 1967
The Chameleon: A cunning man uses a serum to change himself into any kind of thing-animal, vegetable, or mineral-and uses these disguises to grab up valuables. Birdman first spots him as a midget, running off with a diamond, and follows him. Birdman finally catches up with his tricky foe, who is now disguised as the Governor, when the Chameleon's serum runs out.; The Eye of Time: A cosmic storm above Earth is a time tornado which throws the Galaxy Trio back fifteen hundred years to Scandinavia, then being attacked by Romans. Remembering from their history books that Rome never invaded Scandinavia, the Galaxy Trio defeat the Romans before returning to the future.; The Incredible Magnatroid: When Birdman goes out looking for Metallo, an agent of enemy powers who uses magnetic robots to steal a government titanium shipment, he becomes dangerously trapped in his dark metal scrap warehouse. As Birdman's strength ebbs, Avenger reflects some sunlight to restore his power, allowing Birdman to blast his way through the steel roof of the building. Metallo runs to his aircraft only to find the propellers gone as Birdman traps him and his robots in a magnetic trap for the police.
11	"Hannibal the Hunter / The Galaxy Trio and the Cavemen of Primevia / The Empress of Evil"	November 18, 1967
Hannibal the Hunter: Hannibal captures Birdman's longtime friend, Professor Demetrius, to lure Birdman to his secret island and hunt him down with wild animals. As Birdman tries to fly toward the sun to restore his strength, Hannibal catches him in a steel net and starts to lower him into a pit of animals, but an SOS brings Avenger, who saves him. They release the trapped animals, but as Hannibal tries to shoot Birdman down with a rocket and cross-bow, he snares himself in one of his own traps to be captured.; The Galaxy Trio and the Cavemen of Primevia: Disguised as people from Primevia, the Galaxy Trio defeat aliens from Vapor Man's home planet, Vaporus, who had enslaved them and forced them to mine their planet for its precious metals. In his showdown with Vapor Man, Vapon, the leader of the aliens, falls into the Pit of the Winds, there to remain forever.; The Empress of Evil: The legendary Medusa and her Amazons capture a young prince on a hunt and demand a king's crown jewels for his return. Birdman finds and enters her hiding place and uses his solar shield to pass through a wall of flame that she throws up against him. Medusa further drains Birdman's strength by sending illusionary demons for him to attack and is eventually able to take him captive. Birdman uses the young prince's radiant diamond to recharge his power and subdues Medusa's assistants by freezing them, but she throws herself into a pit of demons to elude him.
12	"The Wings of F.E.A.R. / The Demon Raiders / Birdman Meets Birdboy"	November 25, 1967
The Wings of F.E.A.R.: Birdman devises a scheme to learn the identity of kidnappers who have abducted three ambassadors from the UN. He substitutes a robot ambassador for their next intended victim and, when they strike from the air, blows up the robot right in their midst. The culprits escape under cover of a dark cloud and retreat to their mountain headquarters to plot at destroying world peace by first "brainwashing" and then sending back the ambassadors they have captured to their countries, causing confusion and discord. Birdman deflects the weapons they throw at him one by one, rescues the ambassadors, and demolishes their headquarters.; The Demon Raiders: Zakor and his raiders sack the treasury planet, Centauri III, while the inhabitants stand by in a deep trance. When the Galaxy Trio try to stop him, Zakor blasts them into space in the drop pods to orbit forever. Vapor Man changes himself into a vapor and escapes through a crack in his pod then frees the others so they can defeat Zakor's ultimate weapon, the Multi-Seeker.; Birdman Meets Birdboy: Birdman rescues a young boy from a shark-threatened raft and finds him near death. Restoring his life with his own energy, he also transfers to him some of his super-human powers and calls him Birdboy. Birdboy tells Birdman of a strange armored island he has seen which turns out to be inhabited by an evildoer who is planning to use torpedoes and submarines to loot ships and to start wars between countries, and further profit by the confusion. Birdman is captured on the island, but Birdboy escapes and brings back Avenger to rescue him. They smash the island's armaments, but the villain escapes.
13	"The Menace of Dr. Millennium / The Rock Men / Birdman Versus Dr. Freezoid"	December 2, 1967
The Menace of Dr. Millennium: After they scamper off with high-security missile plans, Birdman pursues frightening prehistoric monsters that Dr. Millennium has brought back to life. Birdman temporarily loses the beastly thieves when he is stunned by a caveman, but he lures them back with a trick news broadcast to wrestle them down and recover the secret materials. To avoid being taken, Dr. Millennium turns his time twisting-machine on himself and returns to two million years in the past.; The Rock Men: While looking for rock samples on an unexplored planet in Vector V-16, the geologist Ekon is captured by a huge rock monster controlled by Braton, an escaped convict. After fighting off the monsters, the Galaxy Trio convince Ekon to leave the rock samples and get out of there.; Birdman Versus Dr. Freezoid: When Birdman catches him rummaging through inter-nation security files, Dr. Freezoid turns the whole city to a block of ice and retreats to the North Pole. Birdman thaws out the city and follows, using trick flying, his solar beam, and his solar shield. He breaks down Freezoid's defenses and enters the hideout, only to be sealed inside a block of ice himself. Using the sun to melt the ice, Birdman corners Dr. Freezoid with a brilliant glare of light, but the villain, in a last desperate act, sets his freeze generator to turn his entire headquarters to ice and traps himself inside.
14	"The Deadly Duplicator / Space Fugitives / Professor Nightshade"	December 9, 1967
The Deadly Duplicator: Birdman and Avenger are called in to help when a non-human replica of an army defense general stirs up trouble. In order to get inside the headquarters of the evil professor, who is kidnapping people and replacing them with his duplicates, they fight off a replica Birdman and Avenger. They free the captive by pitting the professor and his duplicate against each other.; Space Fugitives: Disguised as the Galaxy Trio, the last survivors of the planet Magnetron rob other planets of their precious elements to build themselves an army of exploding androids. While the Galaxy Trio seek out the imposters they are pursued by robot drones from the prison planet. Luckily, the drones mistake the Magnetrons for the Galaxy Trio and carry them off to the planet Pententious.; Professor Nightshade: As the inventor of a black box device capable of making people disappear by suspending them in time and space is showing it to colleagues, Professor Nightshade whisks it away. The thief uses the box to make the capital of the country disappear for a time, and then return it, demanding that he be declared supreme ruler. Next he tries to get rid of Birdman by trapping him in a greenhouse of carnivorous plants and using the box on him, but the solar energy the box generates is sent back at the thieving Nightshade to send him into time and space indefinitely.
15	"Train Trek / Space Slaves / Birdman Meets Moray of the Deep"	December 16, 1967
Train Trek: A foreign gang plots to divert an American solar capsule to their landing station by changing places with the astronauts just before the launch. Replacing a city supply train with one of their own, they start toward the site, but Birdman and Avenger rush the train and battle against super-weapons only to lose the gang in a tunnel. Birdman reaches the launching site just at blast off to ground the train tricksters for good.; Space Slaves: When Gravity Girl suddenly disappears, Vapor Man and Meteor Man trace her displaced molecules to the Crimson Zone on the fringes of unexplored space; she is enslaved by Elraf who needs her to devise a quick method of mining psycho-sodium, the active ingredient in the ankle bands which he plans to enslave whole planets. Gravity Girl traps her friends, but when they take off her ankle bands she helps put them on Elraf. When they order him to destroy his evil machines, Elraf's molecules suddenly displace to another part of the universe.; Birdman Meets Moray of the Deep: Birdman, Birdboy, and Avenger head for a dangerous mission: The rescue of kidnapped nuclear scientists who are being forced to work against their will on an atomic reactor in a secret underground laboratory. Disguising himself as a well-known scientist, Birdman allows the kidnapper to take him inside and is forced into a nuclear reactor. The reactor's energy does not destroy, but recharges Birdman's strength, and he joins his two companions, who fear him dead, to bring the scientists to safety, turning the villains over to the Navy.
16	"Birdman and the Monster of the Mountains / The Galaxy Trio Versus Growliath / The Return of Vulturo"	December 23, 1967
Birdman and the Monster of the Mountains: When a village in Tibet is regularly terrorized by a monster, Birdman and his friends Birdboy and Avenger follow the giant tracks and encounter him. As Birdman fights the monster, Birdboy is taken captive by the real villain, an exploiter who has created this mechanical giant to frighten the villagers away from town and the uranium deposits nearby. Smashing the monster, Birdman is cornered by the villain and his uranium ray, but Avenger saves the day by surprising the aggressor, who is downed by his own ray. The grateful villagers thank the heroes for removing the threat over them.; The Galaxy Trio Versus Growliath: Using all their powers together the Galaxy Trio conquer the insects of the planet Nova, which have suddenly grown as big as buildings. Then they give Growliath, the evil scientist behind this, an overdose of the antidote, shrinking gas, which makes him very small and much less a problem.; The Return of Vulturo: An old enemy begins operation revenge by luring Birdman's young companion, Birdboy, to his laboratory. First weakening him, he puts Birdboy on a conveyor belt directed toward a bottomless pit and waits. When Birdman arrives, the schemer causes the sky to cloud over to keep out the sun's energy, locks him in with a paralyzing ray, and puts him on the conveyor belt too. Avenger stops the motion of the belt to allow Birdman time to wrench himself free, intercept the revengeful Vulturo, and have him locked up.
17	"The Revenge of Dr. Millennium / Return To Aqueous / The Ant Ape"	December 30, 1967
The Revenge of Dr. Millennium: Birdman is transported back in time to ancient China by his enemy's time machine, to match powers and wits with him once more. Saving a village from destruction by a mechanical dragon, and fighting off rockets, Birdman, weakens and is captured when his sun-power runs short. While the evil time-wizard is preparing an army of barbarians to attack the people of the 20th century, Birdboy finds and transfers some solar energy to Birdman. Together they use their solar weapons to down the hordes of soldiers and destroy the harmful time-machine as their adversary vanishes.; Return To Aqueous: When the Galaxy Trio respond to an S.O.S. from the planet Aqueous which is being attacked by a monster, Gravity Girl brings along her Analyzer-X camera which reveals that the monster is artificial, with Lotar at the controls. Turning himself to vapor, Vapor Man gets inside, defeats the monster and, with the rest of the Trio, stops Lotar's plot to regain the throne from his brother.; The Ant Ape: Another evil adversary of Birdman's creates a creature of fantastic strength and calls it the "Ant Ape". He orders it to loot museums and even steal a jeweled sword of state from a visiting king and queen. As Birdman pursues, the villain releases all the wild animals from the city zoo to cause general havoc and then makes a large building collapse on Birdman to take him. Birdman is able to escape from the Ant Ape, who has been instructed to guard him, by making him doubt his ability and strength. Recharging, Birdman succeeds in bringing the villain and his creation down to size.
18	"Birdman Versus the Speed Demon / Invasion of the Sporoids / The Wild Weird West"	January 6, 1968
Birdman Versus the Speed Demon: Mixing together a special concoction of chemicals, a prisoner blast himself free while at the same time gaining the power of fantastic speed from the explosion. Capable of out-racing bullets, the demonic speedster first steals a fortune and then a missile. He traps Birdman inside a tornado-force wind and plots to send him off to destruction in the stolen missile, but Birdman is able to use special skills to redirect the missile while the Speed Demon runs himself right into old age as he tries to outrun the missile.; Invasion of the Sporoids: The Galaxy Trio rescue the last ranger on Outpost A-15 from a nearly indestructible spore monster which gives off a mysterious sleeping gas. Combining their super-powers, they defeat the monster without knowing who sent it or for what purpose.; The Wild Weird West: Evil superhuman raiders attack a western town for material gain and revenge in the name of their outlaw ancestors. Birdman and Falcon-7 follow their trail and capture one of them, forcing him to reveal the location of the hideout. Once there, Birdman steps into a trap and is locked up as the gang goes off to derail a governor's train and kidnap him. Birdman faces all four raiders in a shoot-out with laser guns, out-draws them, and restores peace to the west.
19	"The Pirate Plot / Gralik of Gravitas / Skon of Space"	January 13, 1968
The Pirate Plot: A fantastic pirate ship outfitted with the latest electronic gadgetry swoops down on a luxury cruise ship, loots it, and takes hostages for ransom. The pirates shoot down Avenger as he and Birdman fly in to free the captives, and wanting to protect Avenger, Birdman allows himself to be captured. He is forced to walk the gangplank and must fight off sharks in the water before he is rescued by Avenger, who has broken free. They board the ship, disarm the trio of greedy pirates, and leave them to be picked up by the authorities.; Gralik of Gravitas: Gravity Girl's father, the King of Gravitas, asks the Galaxy Trio to help him defeat Gralik, whose ultra-gravitizer can destroy things from thousands of miles away. Although they find him on Moonoid-49, their space ship cannot break through his energy field so they displace their molecules onto the planet. When Gralik threatens to blow them all up, the Galaxy Trio turn his ray on him, and send him a million miles into space.; Skon of Space: Birdman and Avenger are attacked by an unidentified space creature and enter some caves to evade it, but Avenger is sealed inside, unable to help Birdman, who is subjected to an attack by powerful outer space weapons. He deflects all except the cold-ray immobilizer and the commander of the ship, then attempts to transmit Birdman back to his far-away planet, but Birdman gains strength from the solar ray the commander is using on him and breaks free. Birdman locks the ship's controls to return to outer space, advising the commander that all men on Earth have powers equal to Birdman's and that any future invasion would be useless.
20	"Murro the Marauder / Plastus the Pirate Planet / Morto Rides Again"	January 20, 1968
Murro the Marauder: An outlaw who can walk through walls and direct shadows to do his bidding takes a secret defense formula to a subversive organization and offers to trade it for ultimate control over their evil activities. He captures and takes Falcon-7 to a secret island and bombards Birdman with rays and flame cannons when he approaches. Birdman is pitted against his own shadow, which the evil one has brought to life, and that failing, the villain blocks the sun to weaken Birdman; in doing so, however, he also destroys the shadows which he can control, and Birdman disarms the spirit-man forever.; Plastus the Pirate Planet: Hovering above them on Plastus, his rubber planetoid, Plastron threatens to freeze Planet Z-11 by blocking out the sun if the inhabitants do not meet his demands. The Galaxy Trio displace themselves to Plastus but sink in the rubber. When Gravity Girl's density meter reveals that the planetoid is like a gas-filled balloon, they blast a hole in it with Condor 1's retro-rockets to save Planet Z-11.; Morto Rides Again: Wearing a suit of super-armor fashioned he fashioned in the prison's metal shop, Morto escapes and vows to destroy Birdman. Attacking with his mechanical marvel weapons, he stuns, and believes he has killed Birdman. As Morto goes after one million dollars in gold coins, Birdman pursues and, despite a mechanical horse and a smoke screen, overtakes Morto to return him to prison while advising the guards to keep him from the prison's metal shop.

== Production ==
During development, the show was more focused on the Galaxy Trio under the title of The Gang from G.A.L.A.X.Y. and was more of a science fiction adventure series similar to Star Trek. However, during development NBC asked that the series be retooled to be more of a superhero series in order to more directly compete with The Fantastic Four on ABC. Birdman and the Galaxy Trio became one of NBC's highest rated shows, however partway through its second batch of episodes NBC cancelled the show along with other action adventure cartoons like Samson & Goliath and Super President as part of a switch from harder edged action adventure series to lighter and tamer humor focused cartoons resulting in a writedown of $750,000 by NBC.

== Broadcast ==
The series was broadcast on NBC from September 9, 1967 through September 14, 1968. NBC rebroadcast the series from September 1968 through December 28, 1968. Cartoon Network rebroadcast the series beginning in October 1, 1992 and continued to air the series until July 29, 1995.

== In other media ==
Birdman appeared in issues 1 through 7 (April 1968 – October 1969) of the Hanna-Barbera Super TV Heroes comic book, published by Gold Key Comics. He was joined in issue 2 by the Galaxy Trio (their first appearance together).

In 1997, he was also featured in issue #5 of DC Comics' Cartoon Network Presents: Toonami comic book series.

In 2000, the character of Birdman was revived three decades later in the parody Cartoon Network/Adult Swim TV series Harvey Birdman, Attorney at Law; several characters from Birdman and the Galaxy Trio appeared in this satire.

In 2016, Birdman and the Galaxy Trio played a major role in the DC Comics series Future Quest. The series also featured characters from various animated series produced by Hanna-Barbera such as Jonny Quest, Space Ghost, The Herculoids, Frankenstein Jr. and The Impossibles, and Moby Dick and Mighty Mightor.

By 2021, Gravity Girl makes a cameo in Jellystone! She was seen in Mayor Huckleberry Hound's flashback as the referee of the infamous final fight of The Funky Phantom where she pulled him out of the ring after he misused his ghostly abilities on Mightor. Birdman appears in season 3 as a picture, and he is revealed to be dead. Another episode has Space Ghost villains Brak, Zorak and Moltar cosplaying as the Galaxy Trio to infiltrate a convention.

== Home media ==
On July 17, 2007, Warner Home Video released Birdman and the Galaxy Trio: The Complete Series on DVD in Region 1. This DVD set was re-released by the company's Warner Archive division as a manufacture-on-demand (MOD) release on January 10, 2017. Birdman also accidentally appeared on the menu screen for the DC Super Heroes: The Filmation Adventures, a DVD set which featured DC Comics-based superhero cartoons produced by Filmation for The Superman/Aquaman Hour of Adventure (which coincidentally premiered the same day as Birdman and the Galaxy Trio), in 2008. Warner Home Video has stated that this was a mistake, and that Hawkman was supposed to be in Birdman's place.

== Legacy ==
A parody series, Harvey Birdman, Attorney at Law, premiered on Adult Swim on September 2, 2001, concluding on July 22, 2007 after four seasons, with a special, Harvey Birdman: Attorney General, premiering on October 15, 2018, and a spin-off series, Birdgirl, premiering on April 5, 2021.

== In other languages ==
- French: Solaris
- Japanese: 電子鳥人Uバード/銀河トリオ (Denshi Chōjin Yū-Bādo / Ginga Torio; "Electronic Superhuman U-Bird / Galaxy Trio")
- Polish: Birdman i Trio z galaktyki
- Portuguese: Homem-Pássaro e o Galaxy Trio
- Spanish: Birdman y el Trío Galaxia

== See also ==
- List of Hanna-Barbera characters
- List of works produced by Hanna-Barbera Productions
