= Blue Falcon (disambiguation) =

The Blue Falcon is a character in the animated television series Dynomutt, Dog Wonder.

Blue Falcon may also refer to:

- Captain Falcon's vehicle in the video game series F-Zero
- "How Ian Dìreach got the Blue Falcon", a Scottish fairy tale
- Military slang euphemism for "buddy-fucker", one who disregards their team's welfare

== See also ==
- Antonio de Ribera Garcia Azul Falcone, a Harvey Birdman character based on the Blue Falcon
