= Harvey Birdman: Attorney General =

2018 American animated television special

- Poster by Karl Fitzgerald
- Created by: Michael Ouweleen; Erik Richter
- Based on: Harvey Birdman, Attorney at Law by Michael Ouweleen; Erik Richter; Hanna-Barbera cartoons/characters
- Written by: Michael Ouweleen; Erik Richter
- Directed by: Richard Ferguson-Hull
- Voices of: Gary Cole; Stephen Colbert; Chris Edgerly; Paget Brewster; Thomas Allen; Grey DeLisle
- Country of origin: United States
- Original language: English

Production
- Executive producers: Michael Ouweleen; Erik Richter; Evan W. Adler; Richard Ferguson-Hull; Christina Miller
- Running time: 22:35 minutes
- Production companies: Awesome Inc. (animation); 11:36 Entertainment; Williams Street

Original release
- Network: Adult Swim
- Release: October 12, 2018

Harvey Birdman: Attorney General is a 2018 American adult animated television special written by Michael Ouweleen and Erik Richter, and directed by Richard Ferguson-Hull. Harvey Birdman: Attorney General is a continuation of the animated television series Harvey Birdman, Attorney at Law, created by Ouweleen and Richter, that originally aired on Adult Swim from 2001 to 2007. The special was originally released on the Adult Swim website on October 12, 2018, before making its official television debut on October 15, 2018, at 12:00 midnight. In the special Harvey Birdman is appointed assistant-U.S. attorney general and attempts to have now-President Phil Ken Sebben impeached on his own request.

The special took a year to produce. It features the same cast members from the original series reprising their respective roles. It has received generally positive reviews from critics. It was followed by the spin-off television series Birdgirl in 2021.

== Plot ==
Phil Ken Sebben awakes to find that he has been elected the 46th-and-a-half (46.5) President of the United States, without having any memory of being elected. His first act as president is to bring Peter Potamus, who runs a radio show, HippoWars (a parody of Infowars), into his cabinet as Senior Advisor to the President of the United States. His second act is to hire Harvey Birdman, who had retired to become Sebben's ghostwriter, operating out of an off-the-grid lakeside cabin, happily married to a normal woman he only refers to as "dearest wife". Birdman, however, is more interested in publishing his first stand-alone novel, A Matter of Wife and Death. This also reveals how Sebben became a billionaire and financed his law firm, through best-selling action thriller novels.

Narrowly escaping an attempt on his life, Birdman travels to the White House where Sebben primes and launches a nuclear missile at Washington, D.C., which can only be stopped if Sebben is impeached and the new president issues an order to cancel the strike. Birdman is sworn in as "Attorney Corporal" and it is revealed that Birdgirl has already been named Attorney General, and that Sebben, Potamus, and Myron Reducto are planning a "Inaugurpeachment" party; Birdgirl, meanwhile, has no idea how to impeach a president, and is instead reliant on a digital assistant named DeiDra (a parody of Amazon Alexa) to make all legal decisions in the country while Potamus causes an I, Libertine situation over a fake book he claimed to have read at a White House social function.

When Birdman and Birdgirl appear in Potamus' office he immediately crumbles, assuming it has to do with the book, and explains that the Icelandics have overthrown the government. Meanwhile, X the Eliminator and his friend Zardo are on a Pacific island waiting for Birdman and Sebben is hiring Devlin for his Inaugurpeachment. Mentok the Mind-Taker is running a mental health retreat in Iceland who promptly states that he was hired to mind control the entire Americans, and some of the Canadian, population to, in a catatonic state, unanimously elect Sebben as president, and that Birdman is in a coma following the conclusion of the main series, with Mentok using his brain as a storage drive for his thriller novel library, and that Birdman signed off on the plan shortly before going into the hospital. Birdman and Birdgirl recruit Birdboy (aka Peanut), and infiltrate the Sebben & Sebben office, which had been turned into a WeWork, recovering the signed document, and gives a press conference as White House Press Secretary. During which Potamus crashes in and admits that he was behind it to cash in on hat and t-shirt merch sales.

Then it is revealed that Black Vulcan was the previous (46th) President, but, despite Sebben being elected illegally and never actually being president, his efforts to undo the missile fail, with Sebben chiming in that "this isn't how the Constitution works" and that he still needs to be impeached. Birdman, Birdgirl and Black Vulcan fly to X the Exterminator's island and it is revealed that the latter was hired by Black Vulcan to create a series of modified Minuteman IIIs to use domestically on white supremacists, so one is fired to intercept the missile, however, instead hitting Amazon Prime-, Blue Origin- and Alibaba Group-branded delivery rockets.

After all their attempts to stop the nuke headed for D.C. fail, Sebben's Inaugurpeachment goes ahead which sees a drunken shirtless Devlin ride across the entire country on two motorcycles to jump a ramp over the Lincoln Memorial which has had Lincoln replaced with Sebben, crashing into the Samuel Hahnemann Monument, destroying it. Sebben pulls out a Constitution from his pocket stating that defacing a monument is punishable by five months in prison, or impeachment. Black Vulcan is sworn in by Bear and the missile stops mid-air right over the White House. The closing scene hints that the events of the film never happened and was the plot to Birdman's book.

== Voice cast ==
- Gary Cole as Harvey Birdman
- Stephen Colbert as Phil Ken Sebben and Myron Reducto
- Chris Edgerly as Peter Potamus
- Paget Brewster as Judy Ken Sebben/Birdgirl
- Thomas Allen as Peanut
- Grey Griffin as "Deirdre"
- John Michael Higgins as Mentok the Mindtaker
- Peter MacNicol as X the Eliminator
- Toby Huss as Ernie Devlin
- Phil LaMarr as Black Vulcan
- Ferdinand Jay Smith as the narrator

== Production and background ==
Harvey Birdman: Attorney General is a continuation of the animated television series Harvey Birdman, Attorney at Law, which was created by Michael Ouweleen and Erik Richter. In the original series Harvey Birdman served as an attorney for various Hanna-Barbera characters. The pilot episode aired on Cartoon Network on December 30, 2000. The series made its official debut on Adult Swim on September 2, 2001, and ended on July 22, 2007, with a total of 39 episodes over the course of 4 seasons.

Adult Swim president Mike Lazzo offered Ouweleen the opportunity to make a new special during a casual phone call. Ouweleen was given the idea for the concept when his boss, Christina Miller, approached him with the soon-be title "Harvey Birdman... Attorney General". The animation was done by Awesome Inc., an animation company located in Atlanta. Several key animators from the original series were involved. The special was live streamed and posted to the Adult Swim website on October 12, 2018, and made its television debut on Adult Swim on October 15, 2018.

It was written by Ouweleen and Richter, and directed by Richard Ferguson-Hull, who directed most episodes of the original series. The plot of the special serves as a loose parallel to Donald Trump, and his administration as President of the United States. The special focuses more-so on the main characters, as opposed to the original series where episodes would generally focus on classic Hanna-Barbera characters. Richter said this was in-part because they loved the core cast and did not feel they needed many Hanna-Barbera characters. Several Hanna-Barbera characters do make background cameos throughout the special, a common element of the original series.

The primary cast members from the original series returned to reprise their respective roles in Harvey Birdman: Attorney General. The cast was reportedly very enthused about the project and were able to jump back into character immediately. The voice recording process took a single day to complete. Ouweleen explicitly noted that Stephen Colbert was considerably invested into the project right away, with Richter stating that he "didn't do it for the money".

== Reception ==
The original American television airing of Harvey Birdman: Attorney General on October 15, 2018, was watched by 566,000 viewers and received a 0.3 share in the 18–49 demographic.

William Hughes of The A.V. Club gave the special a grade of an "A−". Hughes praised the voice cast, calling them "remarkable", for their respective performances being on-par with their performances in the original series. He praised the entire special as a follow-up to the original series saying "It's striking how much of the special feels like the show is picking up right where it left off back in 2007". The A.V. Club also ranked the special 2nd on their list of recommended television programming for the night of October 14–15, 2018, behind The Deuce.

Dave Trumbore of Collider gave the special 3 stars, which is classified as "Good". Trumbore stated "There's plenty of fun to be found whether you're a new or returning fan of Harvey Birdman".
