= Apache Chief =

- Super Friends and Harvey Birdman character
- Apache Chief as he appeared in Hanna-Barbera's Super Friends animated series in the 1970s and '80s.
- First appearance: "The Antidote" (The All-New Super Friends Hour; 1977)
- Last appearance: "The Death of Harvey" (Harvey Birdman, Attorney at Law; 2007)
- Created by: Hanna-Barbera
- Voiced by: Regis Cordic; Michael Rye; Al Fann; Maurice LaMarche

In-universe information
- Species: Metahuman
- Gender: Male
- Occupation: Superhero
- Affiliation: Super Friends; Justice League; Multi-Culture Pals (Harvey Birdman, Attorney at Law)
- Significant others: Sybil Scussler (girlfriend; Harvey Birdman, Attorney at Law)
- Partnerships: El Dorado; Samurai; Black Vulcan
- Abilities: Size alteration; Clairvoyance; Omnilingualism; Master tracker and survivalist

Apache Chief is a Native American superhero from the various Hanna-Barbera Super Friends and Harvey Birdman, Attorney at Law cartoons and the DC comic book series of the same name. He was one of the new heroes added to our increase the number in non-white heroes in The Super Friends(along with Black Vulcan, El Dorado and Samurai). The visual look of the character was created by cartoonist Alex Toth, who designed many superheroes for Hanna-Barbera beginning in the 1960s. He was voiced by Michael Rye in most of his Super Friends appearances, Regis Cordic in his debut appearance, Al Fann in "History of Doom", and Maurice LaMarche in Harvey Birdman, Attorney at Law.

In the Challenge of the Superfriends series, Apache Chief was seen in every episode except one and had spoken lines in ten out of the sixteen episodes of the series. His arch-enemy from the Legion of Doom was Giganta, who was originally an enemy of Wonder Woman.

== Fictional character biography ==
=== Super Friends ===
Apache Chief first appears in The All-New Super Friends Hour, voiced initially by Regis Cordic and later by Michael Rye, who reprises the role in Challenge of the Superfriends. Apache Chief's origin, shown as a recording in the episode "History of Doom", was thus: while still a young brave, he went for a walk with a Native American Elder, who was also his mentor. The two men are quickly attacked by a grizzly bear, but the Elder, recognizing that the young brave might be ready for a test such as this, gives the younger man a pouch of a special magic powder which will amplify the user's thoughts and abilities a hundredfold. The young man resolves to be strong and brave (heeding the Elder's advice that whatever is in his mind at the time will be amplified by the powder), and upon sprinkling himself with the powder and invoking the magic phrase grows to fifty feet in size, becoming stronger and braver. He disposes of the bear without violence, proving that he has passed the test. However, a girl horseback riding witnesses the entire affair, hoping to use the powder to become big and famous, and uses her lasso to steal the pouch. Despite the Elder telling her that her thoughts were evil, she uses the magic powder on herself and becomes the evil Giganta, proclaiming: "The Medicine Man was right, Apache Chief! Your fifty feet of good are now matched by my fifty feet of evil!".

=== Harvey Birdman, Attorney at Law ===
Apache Chief returns in Harvey Birdman, Attorney at Law, voiced by Maurice LaMarche. Having taken on various odd jobs in addition to his superheroics after being fired from the Super Friends, he develops a fear of coffee and other such hot liquids after being doused in the lap with one such cup in his debut episode "Very Personal Injury" had temporarily lead to him losing his ability to physically change in size, at the end of the episode forming the "Multi-Culture Pals" with Black Vulcan and Jesse Jackson after regaining his powers thanks to the physical appearance of Sybil Scussler, whom he goes on to date. In the series finale, "The Death of Harvey", Apache Chief is once again doused again with coffee and burned shortly after his case is retried.

== Powers and abilities ==
By speaking the words "inuk chuk", which are the Western Apache words meaning "man big", Apache Chief could grow to sizes of varying magnitude. Originally his tribal powers capped his growth at 50 feet tall, but in the episode "Colossus", Apache Chief grows to many times the size of the Earth to battle the Colossus, a titanic space creature that plucked Earth from its orbit and placed it in a small (relative to him) glass bottle. In "Man in the Moon", Apache Chief used the Atom's knowledge of atomic size to grow to 1/5 the size of the earth, with one foot the size of the entire eastern United States, and defeated the creature, sending it back inside the moon.

He also spoke in stereotypical "Native American English" and recited vaguely Native American philosophy. In the 1978 episodes "Revenge on Gorilla City" and "The Time Trap", and the 1984 short episode "The Village of Lost Souls", Apache Chief also has exceptional tracking ability.

== Other versions ==
In the comics, a somewhat similar character called Manitou Raven, created as an homage to him, joined the canonical JLA. Both Manitou Raven and his widow, Manitou Dawn, have been shown to use "inuk chuk" when casting spells or invoking powers.

== In other media ==
=== Television ===
- A character inspired by Apache Chief named Long Shadow appears in Justice League Unlimited, voiced by Gregg Rainwater. Possessing enhanced hearing along with the ability to grow several stories high, Long Shadow is a genetically engineered superhero created by Project Cadmus to serve as a member of their Ultimen and work independently of the Justice League, though the former group are led to believe that they are regular metahumans.
- A version of Long Shadow appears as Tye Longshadow in Young Justice, voiced again by Gregg Rainwater. This version is a metahuman with the ability to project an "astral" version of himself that can grow several stories tall.

=== Film ===
- Apache Chief makes a cameo appearance in Scooby-Doo! Mask of the Blue Falcon.
- Apache Chief makes a cameo appearance in The Lego Batman Movie.

== In popular culture ==
- Apache Chief makes a cameo appearance in the Family Guy episode "PTV".
- A parody of Apache Chief, named in art books as Giant Indian and unnamed in the series itself, appears in The Venture Bros., voiced by Chris McCulloch.

=== Merchandise ===
- Apache Chief received a "Collect & Connect" build-a-figure in series 18 of Mattel's DC Universe Classics.
- Apache Chief received an action figure in the Justice League Unlimited tie-in toyline as part of a three-pack with Samurai and Black Vulcan.
- Apache Chief received a Lego minifigure in The Lego Batman Movie tie-in toy line.
- Apache Chief received an 8-inch figure by Figures Toy Company.
