= Harvey Birdman =

Hanna-Barbera fictional cartoon character

- Birdman and the Galaxy Trio and Harvey Birdman, Attorney at Law character
- Harvey Birdman in Birdman and the Galaxy Trio
- First appearance: Birdman and the Galaxy Trio; — "X the Eliminator"; (September 9, 1967)
- Last appearance: The Robot Chicken Adult Swim Special; (August 30, 2026)
- Created by: Alex Toth
- Adapted by: Mike Lazzo (Space Ghost Coast to Coast); Michael Ouweleen (Harvey Birdman: Attorney General); Erik Richter (Harvey Birdman: Attorney General)
- Voiced by: Keith Andes (Birdman and the Galaxy Trio); Scott Finnell (Space Ghost Coast to Coast); Gary Cole (Harvey Birdman, Attorney at Law)
- Species: Human
- Gender: Male
- Occupation: Lawyer; United States Attorney General; Former superhero
- Significant other: Gravity Girl
- Nationality: American

Harvey Raymond Randall Birdman is a fictional superhero/attorney at law who first appeared on the Hanna-Barbera show Birdman and the Galaxy Trio (1967–1968) as Ray Randall, Birdman, voiced by Keith Andes. After returning as guest host in Space Ghost Coast to Coast (1994–2001; 2001–2004; 2006–2008) as Harvey Birdman, voiced by Scott Finnell, he received a new spin-off solo series in Harvey Birdman, Attorney at Law (2000–2007), voiced by Gary Cole, depicting his legal career. The character returned as United States Attorney General in Harvey Birdman: Attorney General (2018).

== Character history ==
=== Birdman and the Galaxy Trio ===
Birdman was an ordinary human who has been endowed by the sun god Ra with the ability to shoot solar rays from his fists and project quasi-solid "solar shields" to defend himself against attacks. Birdman's origin is only vaguely, and only briefly, hinted at during the series. His real name is there given as Raymond "Ray" Randall. After he had acquired his avian—and other—powers, he was recruited by a top-secret government agency, Inter-Nation Security, and now works full-time fighting crime, assisted by his pet eagle, who responds to the name of "Avenger." In addition to the abilities he received from Ra, Birdman also possesses the power of flight, thanks to the giant wings which sprout from his back. His sole weakness is that he has to recharge his powers periodically, through exposure either to the sun's rays or to a comparable source of heat or light.

=== Space Ghost Coast to Coast ===
In the 1990s, Cartoon Network decided to base new comedy shows on older characters (although in many cases, that simply meant creating a more or less original character sharing their basic name and appearance). Their earliest show of this style was Space Ghost Coast to Coast, where Birdman appeared in five episodes, voiced by Scott Finnell. On the show, he was portrayed comically; depressed, out-of-work and desperate for money. Birdman hosted the show in the episodes "Pilot" and "Sequel", and was fired on both occasions. It was here revealed, contradicting the original Birdman show, that his first name was Harvey. "Harvey Birdman" was the name that writer Evan Dorkin came up with.

=== Harvey Birdman, Attorney at Law ===
Birdman later got his own show, Harvey Birdman, Attorney at Law, now voiced by Gary Cole. In the show, Harvey is a defense attorney, and his clients are generally classic Hanna-Barbera characters given new roles (Fred Flintstone appears, for example, as a mafia don, and Boo-Boo Bear is accused in one episode of being a mad bomber). Many of Birdman's former associates and enemies appear on the show in supporting roles (the character Reducto, now given the first name Myron, regularly appears as a prosecuting attorney, and Mentok the Mind-Taker judges cases from late season one onward). Instead of being a clever superhero, this version of Birdman is portrayed as a semi-competent, bungling lawyer, although among the series's increasingly outlandish cast of characters, he is often the straight man. In the series finale, "The Death of Harvey Birdman", he returns to his superheroing ways, defeating an old enemy before being suddenly hit with a bus and killed.

=== Other appearances ===
- Harvey Birdman makes a cameo appearance in The Powerpuff Girls episode "Members Only".
- Harvey Birdman appears in the Villainous episode "BH's Bizzare Bad-Venture".
- Harvey Birdman makes a cameo appearance in the Jellystone! episode "Epic Rager", where he is implied to have died as seen in Attorney at Law.
- Harvey Birdman appears in the 2026 Robot Chicken television special, "Robot Chicken Adult Swim 25th Anniversary Special", reprised by Gary Cole.
