= Devlin (TV series) =

- Genre: Action; Drama
- Directed by: Charles A. Nichols
- Voices of: Michael Bell; Micky Dolenz; Michelle Robinson; Norman Alden
- Composer: Hoyt Curtin
- Country of origin: United States
- Original language: English
- No. of episodes: 16

Production
- Executive producers: William Hanna; Joseph Barbera
- Producer: Iwao Takamoto
- Camera setup: Gene Cropper; Ralph Milgori; John Curtis Hall; Louis Niemeyer; Roy Wade
- Running time: 30 minutes
- Production company: Hanna-Barbera Productions

Original release
- Network: ABC
- Release: September 7 – December 21, 1974

Devlin is an American animated television series produced by Hanna-Barbera Productions and broadcast for 16 episodes on ABC from September 7 to December 21, 1974, with reruns airing until September 1976. The series, inspired by the popularity of motorcycle daredevil Evel Knievel, featured a stunt motorcyclist with a traveling circus named Ernie Devlin and his siblings Tod and Sandy. It was one of Hanna-Barbera's few dramatic series.

The original title for the show was Wild Wheels, and the title character was "Dare" Devlin. Concerned about potential criticism that the show glorified dangerous activity, ABC nixed the title, changed the character's name to Ernie, and mandated the regular presentation of safety tips.

== Plot ==
Ernie Devlin is a motorcycle stunt rider who is a part of a traveling circus owned by Hank McSummers. His siblings Tod and Sandy help out in preparing his stunts as they have various adventures along the way.

== Cast ==
The main characters were:

- Michael Bell as Ernie Devlin
- Micky Dolenz as Tod Devlin
- Michelle Robinson as Sandy Devlin
- Norman Alden as Henry "Hank" McSummers

=== Additional ===
- Philip Clarke
- Don Diamond
- Sarina Grant
- Bob Hastings
- David Jolliffe
- Robby Lester
- Stan Livingston
- Derrel Maury
- Barney Phillips
- Fran Ryan
- John Stephenson
- John Tuell
- Ginny Tyler
- Don Wells
- Jesse White

== Episodes ==
| No. | Title | Original release date |
|---|---|---|
| 1 | "Victory Over Fear" | September 7, 1974 |
When Ernie tries to jump over 23 cars, he crashes and ends up going to the hospital after which he has second thoughts about being a motorcycle stunt rider. But when some Boy Scouts are trapped on an island after the waters knocked off the bridge, he faces his fears and jumps over the river to rescue the scout troop.
| 2 | "Hero Worshipper" | September 14, 1974 |
A runaway named Pete idolizes Ernie Devlin and wants to be a motorcycle stunt rider like him. However, the Devlins teach this kid there's more to being a star rider.
| 3 | "Save That Lion" | September 21, 1974 |
When a circus lion named Prince runs off, Sandy fears he'll be killed. Instead, he's brought back alive after being subdued with a tranquilizer dart.
| 4 | "Tod's Triumph" | September 28, 1974 |
After coming up with a super roller coaster stunt for Ernie, Tod feels unimportant and left out after Hank tells a reporter that about the mechanical side of the team. A representative from a rival circus offers Tod an important job as a chief mechanic. But when a tornado strikes the city, Hank is trapped in his jeep after a tree falls on it, so Tod uses his brains to rescue Hank.
| 5 | "Up, Up and Away" | October 5, 1974 |
A police safety inspector threatens to close Hank's circus over violations caused by the Gomez family's hot air balloon and Ernie's double loop ramp.
| 6 | "The Challenge" | October 12, 1974 |
A motorcycle racer named Speed Simmons challenges the stunt rider to a motorcycle race.
| 7 | "Sandy's Choice" | October 19, 1974 |
Aunt Martha and Uncle Fred visit the Devlins when they head to their town. Aunt Martha feels that Sandy should live at their home, instead of traveling with the circus.
| 8 | "Sandy's Idol" | October 26, 1974 |
Sandy likes the idea that Hank hires a rock band for his circus. The band's name is Lucifer and its lead singer goes by that stage name as well. Ernie and Tod don't like the idea of Sandy idolizing that band. But Lucifer shows his true colors by acting obnoxious and rude towards the people of the circus.
| 9 | "The Big Blast" | November 2, 1974 |
The Mayor of Turtle River doesn't want Hank's circus to open, because the last traveling carnival / circus ripped off their money. When some boys (who formed the Ernie Devlin fan club) sneak in to visit Ernie, he gives a free performance for his fans. When the mayor finds out, he has Ernie arrested and thrown in jail. A forest fire breaks out near the city. Ernie helps a townsman reach the lumber mill, so he can blast the trees blocking the water supply.
| 10 | "Innocent or Guilty" | November 9, 1974 |
Hank wants Uncle Jack, the oldest member of the circus crew, to retire. After a fire happens at the big top, one of the crew finds Jack's pipe and Hank thinks that it was his carelessness. So Uncle Jack and his dog run away. When they get the new canvas for the circus, Ernie discovers that cinders coming from a nearby lumber mill, which made small burns on the new canvas, were the cause of the fire, not Uncle Jack.
| 11 | "Like Father, Like Son" | November 16, 1974 |
The circus caravan is stuck in a blizzard. Ernie's fear of snow reminds him of when his dad, a motorcycle cop, died during his duty. With less food and shelter for the animals, Ernie decides to overcome his fear and get help. Tod turns his motorcycle into a snowmobile.
| 12 | "Jester's Secret" | November 23, 1974 |
When Jester the clown learns that the circus is heading to Southfield, he asks Hank to make a few changes; that he'd be the ringmaster (with Hank as his assistant), and that he'd go by his real name (Harry). Why? Because he has a daughter in college, and doesn't want her to know that he's really a clown.
| 13 | "The Stowaway" | November 30, 1974 |
After shows in Phoenix, Hank's circus travels to Desert City, Arizona. Along the way, the border patrol stops to inspect if there are any illegal immigrants boarding the circus caravan. When arriving in Desert City, the Devlins discover a stowaway (and runaway) named Juan. Juan wants to be part of the circus by helping Floyd out with the animals, since he's good with animals. But Hank tells him that since he's a minor and his tourist visa expired, he can't work. Juan explains that he ran away from Mexico because his dad wanted him to be a lawyer, like he is, but Juan likes working with animals a lot better.
| 14 | "Sandy's Turn" | December 7, 1974 |
Sandy meets Tina, a little league ballplayer, who's a fan of the Devlins' act. After seeing the billboard Hank came up with, Tina thought Sandy was a star of the circus; that got Sandy thinking of buying her own mini bike. But Ernie insists that Sandy learns the mechanics of the bike as well as driving around in circles, to handle turns.
| 15 | "Sandy's Decision" | December 14, 1974 |
After doing a show, the Devlins discover an intruder in their mobile home; it turns out to be a stray dog. Sandy decides to adopt the dog and name her Muffin. But before moving to the next city, Ernie decides to place an ad in the local paper regarding the lost dog. Thirty days have passed and the real owner finally shows up to claim his dog, Bridget (her real name).
| 16 | "The Storyteller" | December 21, 1974 |
The Devlins meet their dad's old police partner. He impresses the circus of his adventures since leaving the police force. Ernie and Tod don't buy his stories, though Sandy thinks they're true at first. When a pair of black panthers arrive at the circus, Floyd asks for his help, since he claimed to have experience with panthers. But then he admits the truth — all his stories were tall tales. However, Hank gives him a job as assistant ringmaster.

== Home media ==
On May 24, 2016, Warner Archive released Devlin: The Complete Series on DVD in region 1 as part of their Hanna–Barbera Classics Collection. This is a Manufacture-on-Demand (MOD) release, available exclusively through Warner's online store and Amazon.

== Other appearances ==
- An elderly Ernie Devlin appeared in several episodes of Harvey Birdman, Attorney at Law (most prominently "The Devlin Made Me Do It" and "Grodin") voiced by Toby Huss.
- The Devlin siblings appear in the Jellystone! episode "The Mountain Jumpers" with Ernie Devlin voiced by Kyle Bornheimer, Tod Devlin voiced by Jim Conroy, and Sandy Devlin voiced by Georgie Kiddie. In this show, Ernie has a gap in his teeth and had unsuccessful stunts on his Internet streaming channel called "The Devlin Crew", Tod does the filming and different maintenance work, and Sandy provides Ernie with medical care as a DIY doctor. Augie Doggie, Shag Rugg, and Yakky Doodle enlist the Devil siblings to help Yakky leap over Mount Kill-em-all-Jaro for real after Shag Rugg's doctored video had fooled everyone in Jellystone and Mayor Huckleberry Hound wants Yakky to do it for real so that Jellystone can outdo New Bedrock. After a montage with The Devlin Crew, Yakky attempts the jump over Mount Kill-em-all-Jaro only to crash enough for her friends, Ernie, and Dot to attempt to rescue her. After Todd fails, Mayor Huckleberry Hound tells Yakky that she did an amazing job enabling anxious people to gather in Jellystone and advises her to keep up the tourist attraction for a week where the all the expenses for the event will be recouped. In a twist ending, the events of the episode were part of a fan film by Shag Rugg that he made with an app.
