= Birdgirl (TV series) =

American adult animated superhero comedy television series

- Title card
- Genre: Adult animation; Animated sitcom; Comedy; Superhero
- Created by: Michael Ouweleen; Erik Richter
- Based on: Harvey Birdman, Attorney at Law by Michael Ouweleen; Erik Richter; Hanna-Barbera cartoons/characters
- Developed by: Erik Richter; Christina Miller
- Directed by: Rich Ferguson-Hull
- Starring: Paget Brewster; Rob Delaney; Sonia Denis; Kether Donohue; John Doman; Julie Dove; Negin Farsad; Tony Hale; River L. Ramirez
- Theme music composer: Leikeli47; Michael Barney
- Country of origin: United States
- Original language: English
- No. of seasons: 2
- No. of episodes: 12

Production
- Executive producers: Erik Richter; Christina Miller
- Producers: Susan Shipsky; Melissa Warrenburg
- Running time: 22 minutes
- Production companies: Bedford Avenue; Williams Street

Original release
- Network: Adult Swim
- Release: April 5, 2021 – July 17, 2022

Related
- Harvey Birdman, Attorney at Law

Birdgirl is an American adult animated superhero comedy television series created by Michael Ouweleen and Erik Richter for Cartoon Network's nighttime programming block Adult Swim. It is a spin-off of the television series Harvey Birdman, Attorney at Law, which Ouweleen and Richter created for the block. The series stars the voices of Paget Brewster, Rob Delaney, Sonia Denis, Kether Donohue, John Doman, Negin Farsad, Tony Hale and River L. Ramirez. Unlike in the original Birdman cartoon, the Hanna-Barbera-owned characters—including Birdman himself—are missing from the series.

The series premiered on April 5, 2021. (Note: Adult Swim lists the series as premiering on April 4, 2021 at 12:00 a.m. (24:00) EDT/PDT, which is effectively April 5.) On October 4, 2021, Kether Donohue, the voice of Gillian, posted on Instagram that Birdgirl had been renewed for a second season. This was confirmed on February 9, 2022. The second and final season premiered on Adult Swim on June 19, 2022, and HBO Max on June 20.

== Plot ==
Judy Ken Sebben, the daughter of Phil Ken Sebben, fights crime as Birdgirl. When Phil Ken Sebben is killed in an accident, he names Birdgirl as the successor of Sebben & Sebben Worldwide. With help from her friend Meredith the Mind Taker, Birdgirl was able to get Judy to be the new CEO of Sebben & Sebben while still fighting crime on the side. In undoing the crimes her own father committed and combating other emerging threats of rivals while trying to balance between running the company and continuing her life as a superhero, Judy is aided by the Birdteam, an all-new crack team she forms with Meredith and other Sebben & Sebben Worldwide employees.

== Series overview ==
Series overview
Season	Episodes	Originally released	
Season	Episodes	First released	Last released
1	6	April 5, 2021	May 10, 2021
2	6	June 19, 2022	July 17, 2022

== Episodes ==
=== Season 1 (2021) ===
No. overall	No. in season	Title	Directed by	Written by	Original release date	US viewers (millions)
1	1	"Pilot"	Richard Ferguson-Hull	Michael Ouweleen and Erik Richter	April 5, 2021	0.429
While crimefighting as Birdgirl, Judy Ken Sebben hears the news that her father Phil Ken Sebben has died. Due to a lack of a succession plan, the Dog with Bucket Hat and a Phil Ken Sebben impersonator nominate Birdgirl as the successor of CEO at Sebben & Sebben Worldwide. Meredith the Mind Taker senses that Judy has not gotten over Phil's death and works to help her out. Meanwhile, Brian O'Brien works to improve a special toilet that causes whatever anybody poops out to be converted into fertilizer.
2	2	"ShareBear"	Richard Ferguson-Hull	Anca Vlasan	April 12, 2021	0.351
Judy is angry that Meredith does not trust her with important decisions. Brian falls out of a portal following the incident in the last episode. When Etan Delvay (Nicholas Braun), the brilliant but awkward CEO of a rival tech company, proposes to her to test his new invention, the ShareBear (Ron Funches), an AI-powered teddy bear which can perform psychotherapy, on the Sebben & Sebben employees and let her invest in the project, she accepts, risking a large part of her shares in Sebben & Sebben. All employees are given their own ShareBear and confide in it. Brian even takes one after regretting what he did to Scot in the last episode. Meredith does not trust Etan and spies on him. She learns how to obtain all the information stored on a ShareBear, steals Etan's personal Bear and tries to extract the information from it so she can prove her suspicions, discovering that Etan had been the one to buy Judy's shares. But the procedure leads to all ShareBears blurting out the personal information stored on them at once, leading to panic and revolt among the employees. Meredith apologizes to Judy for creating the chaos and for not trusting Judy. The Bird Team destroys all ShareBears, while the employees attack Etan. Meredith and Judy then find a letter from Etan showing she was wrong and that Etan had intended to return Judy's shares to her as a gift for believing in him enough to invest. Now disfigured with his broken body rebuilt with ShareBear parts, a bitter Etan swears revenge on Judy.
3	3	"Thirdgirl"	Richard Ferguson-Hull	Ele Woods and Jessica Haymond	April 19, 2021	0.333
Sebben & Sebben is generating losses and Judy tries to find ways to decrease costs. This leads to rumors of layoffs among the employees. Judy's overly devoted assistant Gillian supports her day and night. Because of her ridiculous amount of overtime hours she costs the company too much money. Meredith suggests hiring a second assistant, but Gillian does not trust anyone and creates a secret second identity so she can take over the nighttime assistant job herself. Later she even creates a third identity. Totally exhausted by her work, Gillian uses energy oils to stay awake. When some colleagues uncover her scheme, stage an intervention, and try to get her to take a vacation, Gillian loses her mind and mutates into a three-headed monster which rampages through the company headquarters. Judy as Birdgirl manages to calm the monster down, leading to the mutation reversing itself. Furthermore, the rampage has led many employees to quit Sebben & Sebben, fixing the financial problems of the company.
4	4	"We Have the Internet"	Richard Ferguson-Hull	Jonterri Gadson	April 26, 2021	0.306
The episode begins with a nun declaring that the Sebben and Sebben building — seemingly growling — is alive! Judy has the staff hand out flyers to tell employees that they have access to the internet in hopes of modernizing the company, while the building falls apart. The building abducts employees and puts them in situations where they have to face their greatest nightmare. Meanwhile, Brian and Meredith are having intimate relations with each other, though Meredith tries to "mindtake" him to forget about it. A little girl named Evie defends the building and is a spokesperson for the building, which does not want to lose its memories of everything since it was built.
5	5	"Topple the Popple"	Richard Ferguson-Hull	Lorraine DeGraffenreidt	May 3, 2021	0.340
The Sebben and Sebben employees revel in getting their first company e-mail system, while Judy announces a change to the "Topple Popple" can, which only big-handed people are able to hold. Unfortunately, the change to a slimmer, easier-to-hold, can, meets with confusion from the masses and anger from a computer hacker. Meanwhile, Paul discovers that his foreskin (Joe Lycett) is actually a sentient being who takes Paul to a civilization inhabited by foreskins, where they try to blood-sacrifice him!
6	6	"Baltimo"	Richard Ferguson-Hull	Michael Ouweleen and Erik Richter	May 10, 2021	0.333
Judy revels in her selling of excess company stationery supplies via the internet. She tries to get the staff to wear Birdgirl uniforms as part of "Bird Team," but, they are reluctant, except for Paul, who is more than happy to wear a BirdTeam thong. Later, office supplies mysteriously disintegrate, apparently due to "Baltimo," a mineral discovered by her father. When she tries to find out more about the mineral, she is abducted to a secret location, where she learns that she ingested Baltimo in mass quantities when she was younger, and which is causing her to slowly disintegrate. She escapes from the facility, only to find an entire town made of Baltimo, whose inhabitants led by their mayor (Brent Weinbach) are throwbacks to an earlier period, and who are suffering the same fate as Judy.

=== Season 2 (2022) ===
No. overall	No. in season	Title	Directed by	Written by	Original release date	US viewers (millions)
7	1	"The Wanky"	Richard Ferguson-Hall	Rowan Wheeler	June 19, 2022	0.196
Judy is obsessed with a childhood toy called "The Wanky," which resembles an adult sex toy, though she does not see it that way, even when her friends try to prove it to her, by making her face her own sexuality. Paul thinks that Judy gave him permission to lead staff meetings about human sexuality. Gillian takes Judy's command to "not move" too literally, to the point where she is starving. After giving The Wanky's creator Mr. Claude his own, state-of-the-art, workshop, he squeezes tears from Judy which become an essential part of The Wanky. When sales of The Wanky skyrocket worldwide, Mr. Claude unexpectedly strips off his clothes and announces his years-in-the-making plan of vengeance for his wife's adultery with Judy's father, causing people around the world to vanish after using The Wanky. The only way to stop the carnage is for sexually-inhibited Judy to use it on herself.
8	2	"The Rejuvication"	Richard Ferguson-Hall	Sonia Denis	June 20, 2022 (Note: This episode aired immediately after the previous on June 19, 2022, at 12:00 a.m. (24:00) EDT/PDT, which is effectively June 20.)	0.148
Gillian and Charles have a romance while Charley is rejuvenating then her skin awakens and steals a truck.
9	3	"Fli on Your Own Supply"	Richard Ferguson-Hall	Amanda Lund	June 26, 2022	0.199
Meredith invents a device which forces people to think positively.
10	4	"Shoot from the Foop"	Richard Ferguson-Hall	Sara Afkami	July 3, 2022	0.209
Sebben & Sebben Worldwide is holding a convention that has also enlisted the involvement of Kerri Strug. Judy gets a new exercise mirror to work on her FUPA, but the person inside the mirror starts manipulating her into making strange business decisions.
11	5	"With a K"	Richard Ferguson-Hall	Amanda Lund	July 10, 2022	0.205
Birdgirl falls hard for a musky vigilante.
12	6	"The S.I.M.M."	Richard Ferguson-Hall	Rowan Wheeler	July 17, 2022	0.268
Dog with Bucket Hat puts Judy through the S.I.M.M. in order to improve her leadership skills at Sebben & Sebben Worldwide when she is unable to fire anyone. While Judy is busy, Meredith takes over and fires Jessica from Accounting for work allegations made towards her with unforeseen results.

== Reception ==
Reviewing the first 2 episodes, Den of Geek praises the "chaotic" pacing and characters, "sweet" backstory, and expresses hope in its potential; their review describes the show as an "exciting new Adult Swim venture that's able to successfully carry on the unhinged atmosphere of the original Harvey Birdman while it takes the material to entirely different places."

The AV Club expressed joy towards Brewster's titular character and lamented that the supporting characters were not as interesting as those in Harvey Birdman, presumably because Birdman was contingent on the inclusion of Hanna-Barbera cartoon incidentals, whereas Birdgirl takes place in a human-centric world.
