= Harvey Birdman, Attorney at Law =

American adult animated television sitcom

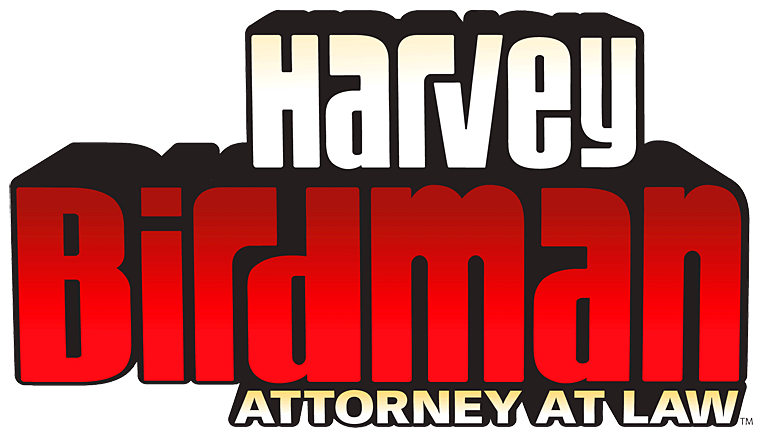
- Genre: Adult animation Animated sitcom Comedy; Superhero
- Created by: Michael Ouweleen; Erik Richter
- Based on: Birdman and the Galaxy Trio and other characters by Hanna-Barbera
- Written by: Michael Ouweleen; Erik Richter
- Directed by: Various (season 1); Richard Ferguson-Hull (seasons 2–4 & Attorney General)
- Voices of: Gary Cole; Stephen Colbert; Thomas Michael Allen; Chris Edgerly; Paget Brewster; John Michael Higgins; Maurice LaMarche; Peter MacNicol
- Theme music composer: Reg Tilsley
- Opening theme: "Harvey Birdman, Attorney at Law", performed by Erik Richter
- Ending theme: "Harvey Birdman, Attorney at Law" (Instrumental)
- Composer: Michael Kohler
- Country of origin: United States
- Original language: English
- No. of seasons: 4
- No. of episodes: 39 (and 1 special) (list of episodes)

Production
- Executive producers: Michael Ouweleen; Erik Richter; Evan W. Adler (seasons 2–4); Keith Crofford (Note: Executive producer for Williams Street) (seasons 2–4); Matt Harrigan (seasons 2–4)
- Producers: Christine Griswold (season 1); Jeffrey Goldstein (season 1); Evan W. Adler (seasons 2–4)
- Editor: Jon Dilling
- Running time: 12 minutes
- Production companies: Williams Street (pilot; seasons 2 (Note: Starting from episode 11)–4); Cartoon Network Studios (season 1 (Note: Episodes 3–9)); Turner Studios (seasons 2–4); J. J. Sedelmaier Productions, Inc. (pilot); Allied Art & Science (seasons 1 (Note: Episodes 2–4)–2 (Note: Episode 1 only))

Original release
- Network: Cartoon Network
- Release: December 30, 2000
- Network: Adult Swim
- Release: September 2, 2001 – July 22, 2007
- Release: October 12, 2018

Related
- Birdman and the Galaxy Trio; Harvey Birdman: Attorney General; Birdgirl; Space Ghost Coast to Coast

Harvey Birdman, Attorney at Law is an American adult animated sitcom created by Michael Ouweleen and Erik Richter for Cartoon Network's late-night programming block, Adult Swim. The first season of Harvey Birdman, Attorney at Law is the first adult animated production to be produced by Cartoon Network Studios. A spin-off of Space Ghost Coast to Coast, the series revolves around Harvey Birdman, originally a superhero from Birdman and the Galaxy Trio, and his new career as an attorney, defending characters who had originally been featured in past Hanna-Barbera, Warner Bros., and Metro-Goldwyn-Mayer cartoons.

The pilot first aired as a sneak peek on Cartoon Network on December 30, 2000. The series officially premiered on Adult Swim on September 2, 2001, the night the block launched. It ended on July 22, 2007, with a total of 39 episodes, over the course of four seasons. The entire series has been made available on DVD, and other forms of home media, including on-demand streaming. A special, entitled Harvey Birdman: Attorney General, premiered on October 15, 2018, and a spin-off, Birdgirl, premiered on April 4, 2021.

== Premise ==
Harvey Birdman, Attorney at Law features ex-superhero Harvey Birdman from Birdman and the Galaxy Trio as an attorney working for a law firm alongside other cartoon stars from other 1960s and 1970s Hanna-Barbera cartoon series. Harvey's clients are also primarily characters taken from the Hanna-Barbera cartoon series of the same era.

Many of Birdman's nemeses from his former cartoon series appear as attorneys, often representing the opposing side of a given case. Harvey usually fills the role of a criminal defense attorney, though he will act as a civil litigator or other similar roles when the plot calls for it.

The series uses a surrealist style of comedy, featuring characters, objects, and jokes that are briefly introduced and rarely (if ever) referenced thereafter. Because the series relies heavily on popular culture references to classic television animation, Harvey Birdman, Attorney at Law constantly delves into parody, featuring clips of these series or specially created scenes which mimic the distinctive style of the animation being referenced.

Harvey Birdman, Attorney at Law is the first Adult Swim series to maintain continuity through the entire series. Various episodes reference Harvey's (or another superhero's) former crime-fighting career. The episode "Turner Classic Birdman" serves to bridge the gap between Birdman and the Galaxy Trio and Harvey Birdman, Attorney at Law.

Much of the humor is derived from giving superheroes and supervillains more eccentric qualities, such as transforming mad scientist Dr. Myron Reducto into a paranoid prosecutor. Several of the plots revolve around popular myths about classic Hanna-Barbera characters, such as Shaggy and Scooby-Doo being recreational drug users.

== Voice cast ==
- Gary Cole as Harvey Birdman, Judge Hiram Mightor
- Stephen Colbert as Phil Ken Sebben, Myron Reducto
- Thomas Michael Allen as Peanut
- Paget Brewster as Judy Ken Sebben/Birdgirl
- Chris Edgerly as Peter Potamus
- John Michael Higgins as Mentok the Mindtaker
- Peter MacNicol as X the Eliminator
- And more

== Episodes ==
Series overview
Season	Episodes	Originally released	
Season	Episodes	First released	Last released
1	9	December 30, 2000	June 8, 2003
2	11	January 1, 2004	November 2, 2004
3	12	July 24, 2005	October 23, 2005
4	7	October 1, 2006	July 22, 2007
Special		October 12, 2018	

== Production ==
Harvey Birdman, Attorney at Law creators Michael Ouweleen and Erik Richter had no credited involvement with Space Ghost Coast to Coast, which featured a separate character with the same "Harvey Birdman" name who was established by Evan Dorkin and Sarah Dyer. The "Attorney at Law" part of the series title comes from a separate Space Ghost Coast to Coast character, Dr. Nightmare, from the episode "Lawsuit", which was also written by Dorkin and Dyer. J. J. Sedelmaier Productions produced the pilot and was subsequently credited in every episode despite their lack of involvement otherwise. Production of the first season was handled by Allied Art & Science, with Cartoon Network Studios joining in after the second episode. The show was Adult Swim's most expensive original series at the time due to its use of digital ink and paint. After the first episode of the second season, both studios were replaced by Turner Studios, who animated episodes using Adobe After Effects. The reason for the switch was that the animation studio was having difficulty maintaining the fast pace of the show, and thus the production of episodes slowed down due to constant retakes.

Bardel Animation in Vancouver provided animation services on Seasons 2 and 3, including Larry Hall directing, Cristina Tanase producing, and Paul Johnson animating, among many others.

== International broadcast ==
In Canada, Harvey Birdman, Attorney At Law previously aired on Teletoon's Teletoon at Night block and later G4's Adult Digital Distraction block. The series currently airs on the Canadian version of Adult Swim.

== Reception ==
In 2009, Harvey Birdman, Attorney at Law was named the 91st-best animated series by IGN. They called the concept of the show "wonderful" and the show as a whole "especially clever." The review summarized that "Harvey Birdman worked as both a parody and homage to these animated characters we know and love, with plenty of funny, surreal jokes along the way."

== Home media ==
DVD name	Release date	Ep #	Additional information
Volume One	April 12, 2005	13	This two-disc box set contains the first thirteen episodes of the show ("Bannon Custody Battle" through "High Speed Buggy Chase") in production order, along with commentaries on selected episodes, deleted scenes, and other special features. A Region 2 version is to be released on November 3. The colour of the DVD box art is purple.
Volume Two	October 10, 2006	13	This two-disc box set contains the next thirteen episodes of the show ("Back to the Present" through "Evolutionary War") in production order, along with commentaries on nine episodes, additional footage, and other special features. The colour of the DVD box art is blue.
Volume Three	July 24, 2007	13	This two-disc box set contains the final thirteen episodes of the show ("Turner Classic Birdman" through "The Death of Harvey") in production order, along with special features. The colour of the DVD box art is black.

Warner Home Video released three volumes of DVDs of the series, each in the shape of a law book. Each season's box art is nearly identical; the only change for each season is the background colour (Volume One is brown purple, Volume Two is blue, and Volume Three is black). The small picture next to the title and the title itself also appears different. In April 2005, Adult Swim had a "Do Our Work For Us" contest for Harvey Birdman Season 1 on DVD. The objective of the contest was to ask viewers to make their own fan-made promo commercial for the then-upcoming DVD.

The series is also available on HBO Max.

== Music ==
The theme song is an edited version of the song "Slow Moody Blues" written by Reg Tilsley. Other notable songs used in the show include Charlie Steinman's "It Is Such a Good Night" (also known as "Scoobidoo Love") and a lyricless version of Gianni Morandi's "La Mia Mania" (also known as "Okay Maria").

== Other media ==
=== Video game ===
A video game based on the series has been released for the PlayStation 2, Wii and PlayStation Portable video game consoles. It was developed by High Voltage Software and published by Capcom, with gameplay mechanics similar to Capcom's Ace Attorney series. It was released on January 8, 2008, and includes five new, interactive cases.

=== Special ===
On May 14, 2018, it was announced that there would be an upcoming special based on the series entitled Harvey Birdman: Attorney General. In the special, Harvey Birdman becomes the next Attorney General of the United States, under President Phil Ken Sebben. The original voice cast returned for the special. It premiered at midnight on October 15, 2018.

=== Spin-off ===
On May 9, 2019, a spin-off entitled Birdgirl was announced, following Judy Ken Sebben/Birdgirl in her new role as the CEO of Sebben & Sebben. It premiered on April 4, 2021, with a second season premiering June 19, 2022.
