= Erik Richter =

American screenwriter (born 1966)

- Born: 1966 (age 59–60)
- Occupation: Writer

Erik Richter (born 1966 or 1967) is an American screenwriter and, with Michael Ouweleen, the co-creator of Harvey Birdman, Attorney at Law.

== Career ==
Around 1998, Richter worked at Cartoon Network and resided in Atlanta, Georgia. By 2002, he had departed from Cartoon Network role and moved to Oakland, California.

Richter also wrote for Space Ghost Coast to Coast. Richter created the Marvel Mash-Ups shorts on Disney XD.
