= List of Ugly Americans episodes =

Ugly Americans is a half-hour animated comedy series created by Devin Clark that ran on Comedy Central from March 17, 2010 to April 25, 2012. On April 21, 2010 Comedy Central announced that they had ordered 7 additional episodes of Ugly Americans, which began airing in October 2010 totaling 14 episodes for the first season. The second season consists of 17 episodes; the first 10 aired in the summer of 2011 and the remaining 7 in the spring of 2012. A total of 31 episodes have been produced over two seasons.

== Series overview ==
Season	Episodes	Originally aired	
Season	Episodes	First aired	Last aired
1	14	March 17, 2010	November 17, 2010
2	17	June 30, 2011	April 25, 2012

== Episodes ==
=== Season 1 (2010) ===
The first season consists of 14 episodes the first seven of which aired in the spring of 2010 and the remaining seven in the fall of 2010.

No. overall	No. in season	Title	Directed by	Written by	Original release date	Prod. code	US viewers (millions)
1	1	"Pilot" "D.O.I. Cutbacks"	Aaron Augenblick & Lucy Snyder	David M. Stern	March 17, 2010	101	2.10
A human named Mark Lilly helps supernatural creatures adapt to life in New York City while managing relationships between his half-demon, half-human girlfriend, Callie, and his recently-zombified roommate, Randall Skeffington. Rated TV-14
2	2	"An American Werewolf in America"	Aaron Augenblick & Lucy Snyder	Jeff Poliquin	March 24, 2010	103	1.89
Mark tries to teach a werewolf and his victim a lesson in trust by relating their challenges to the early history of New York's gang fights between vampires and the Irish in the early 1900s. Meanwhile, Leonard pursues his dream of becoming a famous magician to show up his brother and Randall plots to eat Mark while he sleeps. Special Guest Star: Bill Hader as the werewolf and William Dyer Rated TV-14
3	3	"Demon Baby"	Aaron Augenblick & Lucy Snyder	David M. Stern	March 31, 2010	102	1.88
After having intimacy issues the prior night, Callie goes baby-crazy after Mark starts fostering a demon orphan who is assigned to him when a gangster demon gets arrested for selling his baby to a human couple. Meanwhile, Twayne starts to notice some odd changes in his body and tries to push Callie into a loveless marriage in order to adopt the demon child. Rated TV-14
4	4	"Blob Gets Job"	Aaron Augenblick & Lucy Snyder	Kevin Shinick	April 7, 2010	104	1.36
While staying with Randall's parents in New Jersey (after his father fought in the Human-Zombie Civil Wars in the 1960s), Mark accidentally "outs" his roommate as a zombie. Meanwhile, Leonard (working in DOI alone on Mark's day off) tries to identify a strange new creature (a pink blob monster) who proves to be difficult to place in the workforce due to his offensive remarks. Rated TV-14
5	5	"Treegasm"	Aaron Augenblick & Lucy Snyder	Daniel Powell & Greg White	April 14, 2010	106	2.05
Mark meets a pair of tree creatures who are expected to participate in a public mating ritual sanctioned by the City of New York as a festival, but when the male tree breaks up with his mate so he can enjoy a life of promiscuity, Mark must reunite the couple or the city will be overrun by the tree creature's sexually-frustrated roots. Meanwhile, Callie, driven mad from Painful Mortal Shedding (a demonic condition similar to nymphomania and PMS), assaults Mark with demands of sex while Randall's penis runs away after a day of disgusting and embarrassing sex acts. Special Guest Stars: Kumail Nanjiani as Neel Rated TV-14-DS
6	6	"So, You Want to Be a Vampire?"	Devin Clark & Lucy Snyder	Aaron Blitzstein	April 21, 2010	105	1.97
Mark meets a human woman who wants to become a vampire like her boyfriend (in a parody of the Twilight series). Frank and his crew have to take anger management classes under Leonard, who ends up forgetting about the instruction and hunts vampires with the police. Meanwhile, the people of the city (including Frank) are being afflicted by a strange illness called "Mad Larry", a communicable disease which transforms NYC residents into Larry King clones. Special Guest Stars: Kristen Wiig as Tristen and Fred Armisen as Larry King Rated TV-14
7	7	"Kong of Queens"	Devin Clark & Lucy Snyder	Jeff Poliquin	April 28, 2010	107	2.18
After further budget cuts threaten to shut down his program, Mark struggles to find a job for a giant ape named Kong (voiced by Jack McBrayer) who has obsessive-compulsive disorder and insists on cleaning the skyscrapers he climbs, despite it being illegal for giant apes to climb buildings. Meanwhile, Callie tries to resist her sudden attraction towards Twayne during a convention, and Randall loses the lower half of his body after his top half gets hit by a bus. Rated TV-14-L
8	8	"Better Off Undead"	Devin Clark	Jeff Poliquin	October 6, 2010	108	1.74
Randall believes he is not a true zombie as all he does is stalk the woman who broke his heart, Krystal (who's now dating a Russian-accented cyclops after leaving him for a warlock in the pilot episode), so he joins a zombie cult. Meanwhile, Mark is forced to deal with the clingy, codependent half of an abusive worm monster, who becomes his roommate after Randall moves out, and Leonard lives out his dream of pulling off a bank robbery. Special Guest Star: Dan Castellaneta as Xavier Gates Rated TV-14-L
9	9	"Kill, Mark... Kill!"	Devin Clark	Bill Krebs	October 13, 2010	111	1.75
Mark runs into a series of problems when he volunteers to assist Leonard with issues regarding his wand; Twayne believes he has met his soulmate, who is actually Leonard's evil nemesis, and both wish to re-assassinate the zombie Abraham Lincoln, who is back in the news as Jessica Alba's new lover. Rated TV-14-LV
10	10	"Sympathy for the Devil"	Devin Clark	Greg White & David M. Stern	October 20, 2010	109	1.71
Twayne is forced to do damage control for a scandal-prone, Creature from the Black Lagoon-looking politician campaigning for mayor and things go pear-shape when the politician gets killed during a campaign event.
11	11	"Hell for the Holidays"	Devin Clark	David M. Stern	October 27, 2010	112	1.49
Mark and Randall agree to accompany Callie on a Halloween trip to Hell, where they spend time with her family, who plot against Mark and Randall. Meanwhile, Leonard helps a haunted house with his anger issues. Rated TV-MA-LV
12	12	"Trolling for Terror"	Devin Clark	Daniel Powell	November 3, 2010	113	1.60
After Randall joins the cast of a sleazy reality show about hard-partying faeries (modeled after The Real World and Jersey Shore), the program's unbalanced producer becomes obsessed with Mark, who has to help out a troll who's obsessed with asking riddles. Rated TV-14-LS
13	13	"Soul Sucker"	Devin Clark	Erik Richter	November 10, 2010	110	1.42
Mark gets in over his head when he agrees to be Callie's partner in an ancient demonic ritual; Randall babysits a sexually-confused robot who once belonged to a perverted mad scientist. Rated TV-14-LS
14	14	"The Manbirds"	Devin Clark	Mick Kelly	November 17, 2010	114	1.42
Mark decides to take in a baby Man-Bird that was separated from its family, while Grimes struggles to settle a blood-feud with their champion. Rated TV-MA-LV

=== Season 2 (2011–12) ===
On December 15, 2010, Comedy Central announced that they picked up the show for a 17-episode second season. The first ten episodes aired in the summer of 2011 following new episodes of Futurama. On January 31, 2012, Comedy Central announced that the series will move back to Wednesdays to air the remaining seven episodes on March 14, 2012, following South Park. Among the guest stars lined up for the remainder of the season are Ed Helms, Janeane Garofalo, Lisa Lampanelli, H. Jon Benjamin, Abby Elliott, Bobby Moynihan and Dan Fogler.

No. overall	No. in season	Title	Directed by	Written by	Original release date	Prod. code	US viewers (millions)
15	1	"Wet Hot Demonic Summer"	Aaron Augenblick	Daniel Powell	June 30, 2011	203	1.14
Twayne and Callie must infiltrate a secret Wizard compound where Leonard is training his apprentice...but their complicated strategy involves building a summer camp on a moment's notice, with Mark Lilly as their head counselor.
16	2	"Callie and Her Sister"	Richard Ferguson-Hull & Devin Clark	Mick Kelly	July 7, 2011	202	0.98
After Callie repeatedly refuses to go through with her arranged marriage to Twayne, her parents temporarily get back together and have a second daughter to take her spot. After Mark and Callie move in together, they are forced to act as substitute parents for Callie's younger, hotter sister, who has evil plans regarding Mark.
17	3	"Ride Me to Hell"	Aaron Augenblick & Devin Clark	Mike Rowe	July 14, 2011	205	0.81
The series finale of his favorite TV series, "Dishonorable Discharge" sends Grimes off the deep end due to its anticlimactic ending. Mark has to help him get to the bottom of his inexplicable attachment to the show, uncovering a deep seated memory along the way.
18	4	"G. I. Twayne"	Aaron Augenblick & Devin Clark	Jeff Poliquin	July 21, 2011	201	0.85
Twayne is drafted into the Army of Satan. When Mark is forced to join him, he discovers a plan to end humanity. Special Guest Star: Rob Riggle as the Drill Sergeant.
19	5	"The Ring of Powers"	Richard Ferguson-Hull & Devin Clark	Greg White	July 28, 2011	206	0.87
Mark accidentally puts on an engagement ring belonging to Leonard, which helps him influence two dragons to mate, makes people take him seriously now that he has the power of influence, and sets him up to be the unwilling groom to a cryogenically-frozen bride. Special Guest Star: Todd Barry as a Dragon.
20	6	"Attack of Mark's Clone"	Richard Ferguson-Hull & Devin Clark	Adam Stein & David M. Stern	August 4, 2011	208	0.73
Callie creates clones of Mark to win a bowling tournament. But Mark's Clone finds a message in Callie's diary, and decides to get revenge by framing her for murder.
21	7	"Wail Street"	Aaron Augenblick & Devin Clark	Daniel Powell	August 11, 2011	207	0.89
Randall puts Mark's soul up for sale, Grimes pursues his dream of creating a pop music act with a teen sensation.
22	8	"Little Ship of Horrors"	Aaron Augenblick & Devin Clark	Mick Kelly	August 18, 2011	209	0.78
Twayne throws a company party aboard a cruise ship; Randall gets sick from dangerous pollen.
23	9	"Lilly and the Beast"	Aaron Augenblick & Devin Clark	Bill Krebs	August 25, 2011	212	0.82
Callie reveals to Mark that she's been sleeping with other guys. A girlfriend from Marks past returns, with a dark secret. Special Guest Star: Jenny Slate as Jaclyn
24	10	"Mummy Dearest"	Richard Ferguson-Hull & Devin Clark	Jeff Poliquin	September 1, 2011	210	0.86
Randall feels neglected; Grimes mummy returns. Special Guest Star: Christine Baranski as Grimes' Mummy.
25	11	"Journey to the Center of Twayne"	Aaron Augenblick & Devin Clark	Erik Richter & Jeff Poliquin	March 14, 2012	213	1.05
An ant-sized arsonist named Jerry flees Mark's custody, escaping up Twayne's nostril. A miniaturized Leonard, Grimes and Mark must track Jerry through Twayne's body to bring him to justice.
26	12	"Any Given Workday"	Richard Ferguson-Hull	Greg White	March 21, 2012	211	0.75
With the big company intramural football game around the corner, everyone starts getting nervous about the lineup – Mark is a wonderful team player, but a terrible actual player. When Randall demonstrates the power of his recently replaced arm, he is given a job at the D.O.I. as the team's ringer.
27	13	"The Roast of Twayne the Boneraper"	Aaron Augenblick & Devin Clark	Erik Richter, Jeff Poliquin & Jordan Pomaville	March 28, 2012	214	1.03
In honor of Twayne's 10-year anniversary of running the D.O.I., Callie and the crew throw him a Roast. But when Mark's attempt at edgy humor goes too far, Twayne quits, leaving Mark in charge. Before his first day as boss is up, Mark makes a management mistake so catastrophic that it almost destroys New York City. Special Guest Star: Lisa Lampanelli as herself
28	14	"Mark Loves Dick"	Les Solis & Lou Solis	Jeff Poliquin	April 4, 2012	216	1.26
Mark becomes conflicted about his relationship with Callie after she gets a promotion by turning herself into a man. He does his best to be understanding, but their love is soon put to the test when they are asked to embark on a dangerous mission to the fabled underwater city of Atlantis. Special Guest Star: H. Jon Benjamin as Dick Maggotbone.
29	15	"The Stalking Dead"	Les Solis & Lou Solis	Erik Richter	April 11, 2012	204	0.91
When the country's biggest pop star turns into a zombie, millions of her devoted fans follow suit; Mark befriends one of the new zombies and Randall is forced to deal with his jealousy issues.
30	16	"The Dork Knight"	Aaron Augenblick & Devin Clark	Daniel Powell	April 18, 2012	215	1.06
After being bitten by a rabid Bat-Boy, Mark becomes a masked crimefighter; Mark wages war against New York's criminals and their catlike leader with the help of his loyal sidekick, Koala Man. Special Guest Voice: Janeane Garofalo
31	17	"Fools for Love"	Les Solis & Lou Solis	Erik Richter	April 25, 2012	217	0.98
Mark chooses April Fool's Day to ask Callie to take their relationship to the next level, but his romantic gesture is threatened when Callie's vengeful ex-boyfriend returns to win her back; Leonard tries to redeem a winning lottery ticket. Special Guest Voice: John Gemberling as Barney Snodgrass.

== Ratings Graph ==
Ugly Americans : U.S. viewers per episode (millions)

Season	Episode number																
Season	1	2	3	4	5	6	7	8	9	10	11	12	13	14	15	16	17
1	2.10	1.89	1.88	1.36	2.05	1.97	2.18	1.74	1.75	1.71	1.49	1.60	1.42	1.42	–		
2	1.14	0.98	0.81	0.85	0.87	0.73	0.89	0.78	0.82	0.86	1.05	0.75	1.03	1.26	0.91	1.06	0.98

Audience measurement performed by Nielsen Media Research
