= Treegasm =

- Ugly Americans episode
- Tree creatures Neel and Nicky in Central Park before the mating ritual commences
- Episode no.: Season 1 Episode 5
- Directed by: Aaron Augenblick; Lucy Snyder
- Written by: Daniel Powell; Greg White
- Original air date: April 14, 2010

Guest appearance
- Kumail Nanjiani as Neel

Episode chronology
← Previous "Blob Gets Job"	Next → "So, You Want to Be a Vampire?"

"Treegasm" is the fifth episode of the first season of the American animated television series Ugly Americans. which aired on Comedy Central in the United States on April 14, 2010. In the episode, Mark meets a pair of tree creatures who are expected to participate in a public mating ritual sanctioned by New York City as a festival. Meanwhile, Callie demands to have sex with Mark to ease the pain from her shedding, and Randall loses his penis after visiting a movie theater.

Written by Daniel Powell and Greg White and directed by Aaron Augenblick and Lucy Snyder, "Treegasm" was inspired by funny-looking trees, such as trees that appear to have genitalia or are having sex. The episode also marked a milestone with the staff, as it was the first episode to feature creatures they came up with themselves, as opposed to common creatures such as werewolves or zombies. Stand-up comic and actor Kumail Nanjiani guest stars in the episode as the tree Neel.

According to Nielsen Media Research, the episode was watched by 2.05 million viewers in its original airing, an increase in viewership compared to the previous episode, "Blob Gets Job". "Treegasm" and six other episodes from the season were released on DVD in the United States on October 5, 2010.

== Plot ==
Tourists visit Central Park for 'Treegasm', a once-in-a-lifetime mating ritual between two tree creatures, or 'treatures'. The trees grow towards each other for decades before engaging in a ritual known as "screwing". Mark Lilly cannot understand why people care about two trees losing their virginity. Demon bureaucrat Twayne Boneraper has been appointed to be in charge of the ceremony, but gives the job to Mark and wizard Leonard Powers as he has to spend four days to get fitted for a triple-breasted suit. Meanwhile, demon Callie Maggotbone demands to have sex with Mark, and Leonard explains to him that a female demon's body is so toxic that she has to periodically shed it for a new one, and sex is the only thing that can ease her pain. Later in Central Park, Mark introduces himself to the tree creatures, Nicky and Neel, as their "screwing coordinator". Mark remarks that it is refreshing for two beings to be so committed to each other as opposed to just having sex with strangers. Neel begins to feel anxious about the ritual, as Mark's remarks about having sex with others sounds more exciting. Later, Neel breaks up with Nicky as Mark opened his eyes for other opportunities. Neel states that Nicky is predictable and that he wants someone crazy. Mark accepts Neel's change of heart, but Leonard explains to him that the tree creatures are forced to mate because their roots run so deep that they encompass Manhattan. If Neel does not ejaculate soon, his root could swell up and endanger the entire city.

Twayne assigns Mark to fix the problem, and Mark enlists his zombie roommate Randall to talk about his unhealthy sex experiences to Neel. Randall's story makes Neel change his mind and go back to Nicky. Later, 'Treegasm' is about to commence, but Neel is nervous because of the pressure and the event's many spectators. His roots begin to swell and come up above ground and seize different buildings. The pressure causes his sexual organ to go flaccid, and Leonard quickly enchants him with a magical spell that acts like Viagra. Callie takes Mark with her into a portable toilet for the final sex before her shedding. Just as Neel is about to penetrate Nicky, Callie sheds and reveals herself in her new form while standing naked, mimicking The Birth of Venus. The pressure causes Neel to suffer from premature ejaculation and he ejaculates all over the park. Later, when the crowd has left, Leonard enchants Neel with a spell to make him less nervous and the ritual continues without spectators. Callie and Mark meet at a bar later for drinks, but when Mark invites her to sit with him, she teases him, saying she lost respect for him for allowing her to do some of the things she has done to him.

Meanwhile, Randall loses his penis after having sex with a female he met at the movie theater. After he fails to find it, he tries to get used to life without having a penis, but considers killing himself. However, he receives a call from the police who informs him that they have found his penis, but tells him that it did not fall off, it ran away because it did not like the way Randall treated it. To make it come back, Randall has to follow a few conditions, such as accepting it as an equal, which Randall gladly approves of.

== Production ==
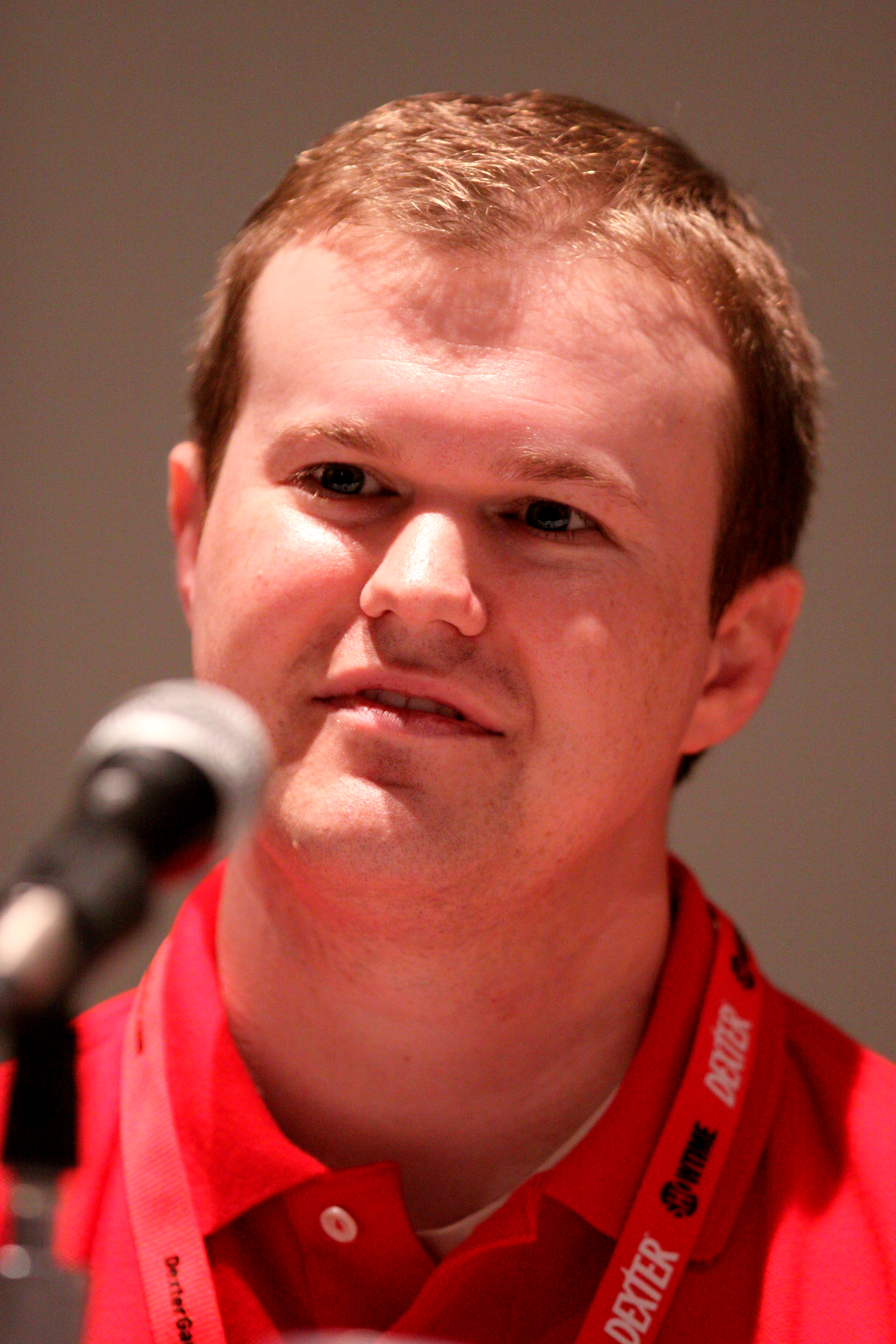
"Treegasm" was co-written by Daniel Powell (pictured) alongside Greg White.

"Treegasm" was written by Daniel Powell and Greg White and directed by Aaron Augenblick and Lucy Snyder. The story originated from when series developer and executive producer David M. Stern saw a tree in his backyard that looked like it had an "enormous set of testicles". Later, a writer's assistant for the series showed him a website with images of different trees that looked like they had genitalia or were having sex. The trees spurred an idea involving two trees that had been growing towards each other for 150 years and then one of them gets "cold feet" at the last minute. Creator Devin Clark said that he likes the episode because it focuses on creatures that the staff came up with themselves, rather than classic mythological creatures. Prior to the episode, the writers mainly used common beings, such as werewolves and zombies, so that viewers would get familiar with the series' world. Co-writer Powell researched "tree mythology", such as the evil trees from The Wonderful Wizard of Oz, before writing the episode, but stated that he could not find much on the subject.

According to Stern, it was "very hard" to express in script form how funny it was that the trees do not move at all. Since they do not move, their mouths were designed to look like nutcracker mouths. Stand-up comic and actor Kumail Nanjiani guest starred in the episode as the tree Neel. In addition to the regular cast, recurring guest voice actors Julie Klausner and Pete Holmes made minor appearances in the episode as an anchorwoman and Al Pacino, respectively. The music in "Treegasm" was composed by Andrew Landry and Bradford Reed. The score for the episode's cold open is one of Clark's favorites of the season, stating that he "love[s] the '80s stuff".

== Reception and release ==
"Treegasm" originally aired on Comedy Central in the United States on April 14, 2010. The episode was watched by 2.05 million viewers, according to Nielsen Media Research. It also acquired a 1.1 rating in the 18–49 demographic, a higher rating than the previous episode, "Blob Gets Job", which had a 0.7 rating. "Treegasm" was also an improvement in total viewership from "Blob Gets Job", which was viewed by 1.36 million. Overall, "Treegasm" was the third most watched episode of the series' first season. According to Stern, the response of "Treegasm" was more positive than previous episodes. However, it was met with a rather negative review from About.com critic Nancy Basile, who wrote "I'm enjoying some of Ugly Americans, though I think I could have done without the 'Treegasm' episode."

On October 5, 2010, the episode was released as part of the single-disc DVD set Ugly Americans: Season 1, Volume 1 along with the six other episodes. Crew members David M. Stern, Daniel Powell and Devin Clark participated in the episode's audio commentary. The set also includes bonus features, such as an art gallery, the original web episodes of 5-On and sneak peek clips and art from then-upcoming episodes.
