= Callie and Her Sister =

- Ugly Americans episode
- The zombie Randall takes Lilith out on a date, which upsets Mark, who begins to act as if Lilith is his daughter.
- Episode no.: Season 2 Episode 2
- Directed by: Richard Ferguson-Hull; Devin Clark
- Written by: Mick Kelly
- Production code: 202
- Original air date: July 7, 2011

Episode chronology
← Previous "Wet Hot Demonic Summer"	Next → "Ride Me to Hell"

"Callie and Her Sister" is the second episode of the second season of the American animated television series Ugly Americans, and the sixteenth overall episode of the series. It originally aired on Comedy Central in the United States on July 7, 2011. In the episode, half-demon Callie Maggotbone repeatedly refuses to go through with her arranged marriage to Twayne Boneraper. To convince her father she is serious with her boyfriend Mark Lilly, she asks him to move in with her. Following a therapy session held by Mark, Callie's divorced parents get back together and produce a second daughter, Lilith, who will replace Callie as Twayne's bride. Callie and Mark later take on the job to raise Lilith, who develops evil plans for the wedding.

The episode was written by Mick Kelly and directed by Richard Ferguson-Hull and series creator Devin Clark. The episode features guest performances by recurring voice actors Pete Holmes, Julie Klausner and Mike O'Gorman. "Callie and Her Sister" includes a homage to the horror film The Omen, along with other minor allusions to Rosemary's Baby and The Shining. Critical responses to the episode were positive; critics called it solid and memorable and praised its humor as well as the character development of Callie. According to Nielsen Media Research, the episode was watched by 980,000 viewers in its original airing in the United States, which was deemed steady compared to the season premiere, "Wet Hot Demonic Summer".

== Plot ==
Half-demon Callie Maggotbone's demon father Aldermach is pressuring her to break up with her boyfriend Mark Lilly and marry Twayne Boneraper, to fulfill an ancient magical blood pact; Aldermach gets paid by Twayne's family to deliver him a bride, and if he does not, he will get murdered. Callie refuses to marry Twayne, and to prove that her relationship with Mark is serious, she invites him to move in with her, but does not tell him about her arranged marriage to Twayne. Meanwhile, Mark is having troubles at the Department of Integration; he receives rather negative feedback on his teacher evaluation forms from his students. Since the department cannot afford having individual sessions with students, he decides to hold them at his and his zombie roommate Randall's apartment. At his first session, Mark is kidnapped by Aldermach who bribes him to break up with Callie. Mark declines, and Callie's human mother Rosie shows up and argues with Aldermach, which gives Mark the idea to invite them both to therapy sessions. Following the session, Mark leaves the room for a short while, and when he comes back, Aldermach and Rosie are having sex and eventually get back together.

The next day, Rosie and Aldermach announce that they have given birth to Callie's sister, Lilith. Thanks to the hormone injections Rosie has had, it only took a day for Lilith to be born and she will age one year, every day, and take Callie's place as Twayne's bride. After an accident caused by Lilith, Rosie is hospitalized and Mark and Callie take on the task to raise Lilith. In just a few weeks, she is eighteen years old and has started dating Randall. Mark takes in Twayne for a session and finds out about his arranged marriage to Lilith, and that the marriage will be a televised sex ritual. Callie realizes that she is forcing Lilith to marry Twayne, just like her father forced her, and tells Lilith that she does not want her to marry him. Lilith, however, wants to the opposite of what Callie wants and tells her that she will marry him. Just before the ritual is about to commence, Lilith reveals to Mark that she plots to kill Callie and Twayne and instead join Mark at the sex altar. Mark informs Callie, who takes out her soul to transform into a more demonic figure. Following a battle between the two, Lilith falls down to a lower level of Hell. Later, Callie kicks Mark out of her apartment as she does not have to marry Twayne anymore.

== Production and cultural references ==
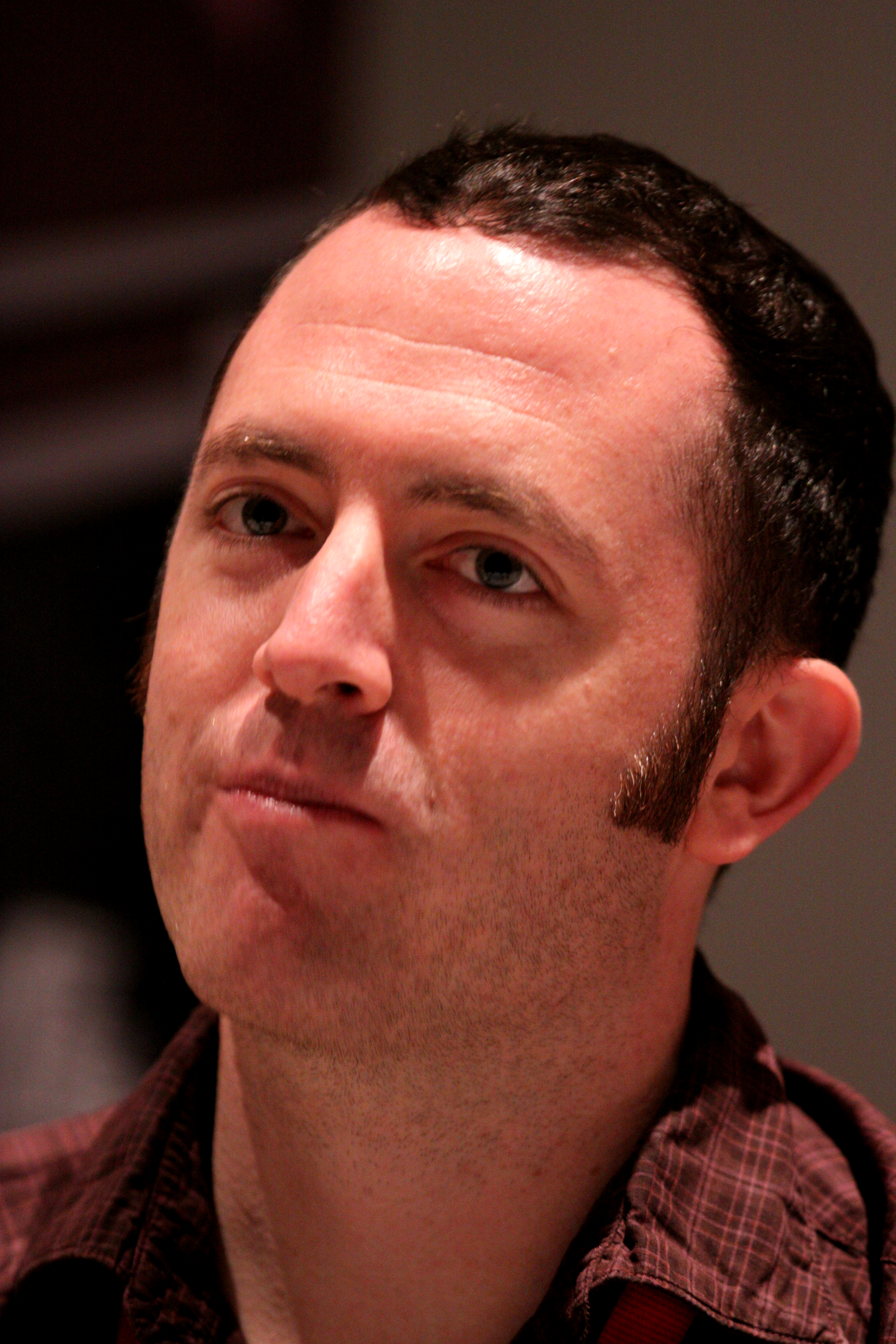
Series creator Devin Clark co-directed the episode.

"Callie and Her Sister" was written by Mick Kelly, in his second writing credit for the series, following the first season finale "The Manbirds". The episode was directed by series creator Devin Clark and Richard Ferguson-Hull. "Callie and Her Sister" marked Ferguson-Hull's first directing credit for the series; he previously served as a director for the Adult Swim animated series Harvey Birdman, Attorney at Law (2000–07). In addition to the main cast, "Callie and Her Sister" features appearances by recurring guest voice actors Pete Holmes, Julie Klausner and Mike O'Gorman. Klausner provided the voices of Lilith and Rosie, and main cast member Larry Murphy returned to voice Callie's father Aldermach. "Callie and Her Sister" was first hinted at in June 2011 during an interview by Clark on what to expect in the series' second season, where he revealed the episode's main plot and its references: "Callie's parents get back together in one episode and give birth to a sister for Callie who because of being a supernatural creature, ends up aging one year, every day, and we have an homage to The Omen in there. Mark and Callie end up taking over the responsibilities of her parenting dealing with this demonic child."

The story of Mark and Callie taking care of Callie's sister Lilith, who eventually matures into an eviler version of Callie, pays homage to the horror film The Omen (1976). The homage to The Omen also includes elements of another horror film, Rosemary's Baby (1968). Lilith's "creepy" and demonic characteristics as a child drew comparisons towards the film The Shining (1980), and the episode's title mimics the comedy-drama film Hannah and Her Sisters (1986). The review website Yelp is mentioned when Mark tells his clients to leave him a favorable review at the site.

== Reception ==
The episode originally aired in the United States on Comedy Central on July 7, 2011, following the Futurama episode "Law and Oracle". According to Nielsen Media Research, "Callie and Her Sister" was watched by 980,000 viewers, compared to the 1.55 million who watched Futurama. The episode also acquired a 0.5 rating in the 18–49 demographic, which TV by the Numbers writer Robert Seidman noted was "steady" compared to the rating for the previous episode, "Wet Hot Demonic Summer". However, the episode marked a slight downfall in total viewership, as the season premiere drew an audience of 1.14 million.

I identify best with Mark (don't we all?) and I find his well-meaning awkwardness very charming, but I always get super excited for Callie's demon-centric episodes, and man, tonight was one to remember.

— Josh Harrison, Ology

"Callie and Her Sister" was met with positive reviews from television critics. MTV writer Charles Webb referred it to as "really solid" and "more character-focused" than the season premiere. He commented that "[the episode] leads to a marked improvement in the humor, which simply flows from scene to scene." Webb also praised that the series' writers allow Callie to develop her character, stating: "While we don't exactly get any great new insights about the character [...] it's still cool that the writers are allowing her to develop a little given their non-continuity driven focus." Webb particularly praised the episode's montage scene and the continuing "top-notch" animation style.

Josh Harrison of entertainment website Ology rated the episode 8 out of 10 and wrote that "[it] was one to remember". Harrison noted that the writers appear to explore the characters' backgrounds during the second season, like how Leonard's background was in focus in "Wet Hot Demonic Summer". Harrison concluded his review while commenting on "Callie and Her Sister": "This sort of episode is still in its early stages, but I don't begrudge Ugly Americans the training wheels if it means we get to better know the people and creatures of the fascinating animated world. Good stuff, I say, and I'd like to see more of it."
