= City Island (TV series) =

- Official promotional poster
- Genre: Comedy; Slice of life; Adventure
- Created by: Aaron Augenblick
- Voices of: Kimia Behpoornia; Kimiko Glenn
- Theme music composer: Tunde Adebimpe
- Country of origin: United States
- Original language: English
- No. of seasons: 2
- No. of episodes: 40

Production
- Executive producers: Aaron Augenblick; Gemma Correll; Daniel Powell
- Running time: 3 minutes
- Production companies: Future Brain Media; Augenblick Studios

Original release
- Network: PBS Kids
- Release: December 26, 2022 – July 5, 2024

Related
- City Island Sings!

City Island is an American children's 3-minute short education comedy animated television series created by Aaron Augenblick. The series features two young inanimate friends (voiced by Kimia Behpoornia and Kimiko Glenn) in the fictional city of City Island learning about how the city works, with a focus on civics. The three-minute episodes play between long-form series on PBS Kids. City Island debuted in December 2022.

== Synopsis ==
City Island is an educational series of animated shorts that follow a talking light bulb named Watt and his best friend, a kite named Windy. The series educates children on civics-related topics including economics, geography, finance, and transportation.

== Cast ==
=== Main cast ===
- Kimia Behpoornia as Watt
- Kimiko Glenn as Windy/Sally/Piper
- James Adomian as Detritus
- Rachel Pegram as Lidia
- Branson Reese as Frank Lloyd Light
- James III as Mark

=== Guest stars ===
- Amy Schumer as Terra, the planet where City Island is located
- Julio Torres as Ringer
- Ellen Cleghorne as Mayor Sitwell
- Michael-Leon Wooley as Carry
- Debi Mazar as Laney
- Rachel Bloom as Venus Flytrap
- Rosie Perez as Rosey Rivet
- Ali Stroker as Lacey/Ms. Rita/Ms. Leslie
- Vanessa Bayer as Ms. Webster

== Episodes ==
=== Season 1 (2022–23) ===
- EP1: President Watt
- EP2: Point of View
- EP3: Circus Beach
- EP4: Sportsmanship
- EP5: Retirement Home
- EP6: Architect
- EP7: The World
- EP8: Town Hall
- EP9: Snow Day
- EP10: Art Museum
- EP11: Airport
- EP12: Skytown
- EP13: History
- EP14: Post Office
- EP15: Stuck
- EP16: Library
- EP17: Flag Day
- EP18: Skating Rules
- EP19: Pets
- EP20: Celebration

=== Season 2 (2024) ===
- EP1: The News
- EP2: Skyline
- EP3: Theater Street
- EP4: Dancing Rules
- EP5: Family Tree
- EP6: Future
- EP7: Venus Flytrap
- EP8: Advertising
- EP9: Hospital
- EP10: Maker Hill
- EP11: Movies
- EP12: Garbage
- EP13: Shopping
- EP14: Clouds
- EP15: Internet
- EP16: Maps
- EP17: Investigate
- EP18: Flashback
- EP19: Swap Day
- EP20: Holidays

== Production ==
City Island was created by Aaron Augenblick, known for Ugly Americans and Wonder Showzen. Augenblick stated that he created the series in part as an homage to Sesame Street, "because I’ve always liked the idea that, in any episode, kids can … meet all these different people in a location that’s friendly, inviting, and seems like it would be really fun to hang out in." The purpose of the series is to educate children about civics. Augenblick worked with academic Elizabeth Hinde to decide what concepts to cover. Season 2 expanded content to include media literacy with collaboration from National Association for Media Literacy Education.

The theme music was composed by TV On The Radio’s Tunde Adebimpe. The style is based on the work of art director Gemma Correll.

Each episode is approximately 3 minutes long and plays as interstitial content between long-form series.

== Release ==
The series debuted in December 2022. Season 2 debuted on July 5, 2024. City Island airs on PBS Kids and on the official website in the United States.

City Island Sings!, a spin-off series of music videos with original songs inspired by artists such as The Beatles, Dua Lipa, and David Bowie, premiered on May 29, 2024.

== Accolades ==
=== 2024 ===
- Winner, Webby Awards, Kids & Family Video
- Winner, Webby Awards, People's Voice, Kids & Family Video
