= Attack of Mark's Clone =

- Ugly Americans episode
- Clone Mark threatens to slap Randall with a glove, a recurring event throughout the episode.
- Episode no.: Season 2 Episode 6
- Directed by: Richard Ferguson-Hull; Devin Clark
- Written by: Adam Stein; David M. Stern
- Production code: 208
- Original air date: August 4, 2011

Guest appearances
- Kate McKinnon; Jay Oakerson

Episode chronology
← Previous "The Ring of Powers"	Next → "Wail Street"

"Attack of Mark's Clone" is the sixth episode of the second season of the American animated television series Ugly Americans, which aired on Comedy Central in the United States on August 4, 2011. In the episode, Callie creates a clone of Mark that will guarantee the Department of Integration's win in a bowling tournament, but the plan backfires when the clone frames her for murdering Twayne's new assistant, Tad.

The episode was written by Adam Stein and series developer David M. Stern, and directed by Richard Ferguson-Hull and series creator Devin Clark. The episode features guest performances by comedians Kate McKinnon and Jay Oakerson. According to Nielsen Media Research, "Attack of Mark's Clone" was watched by a season low of 730,000 viewers in its original airing. The episode received positive reviews from critics, who deemed it solid.

== Plot ==
Callie Maggotbone creates a clone of Mark Lilly to replace him in the Department of Integration's (D.O.I.) bowling tournament, as the real Mark is a "terrible bowler". The clone, who has blonde hair instead of brown, has a sadistic worldview and hides the real Mark in his closet. The following day, Twayne Boneraper hires a new assistant named Tad to do his dirty work. Tad's first action is to reassign Callie, whom he thinks is a saboteur, to a useless department in sub-basement 37. Tad also cuts Mark's department's budget by 80%, but is rather impressed by the Clone Mark's attitude. The next day at his group therapy session with Mark's students, Clone Mark turns it into a fight club to train them for the bowling tournament. Later, Clone Mark finds Callie's diary at her apartment and finds out that she plans to murder him after the tournament and then get the real Mark back. Infuriated, he decides to murder Tad and frames Callie for the crime by using a trident from her apartment as the weapon and leaving it at the scene. Callie gets hauled in by Frank Grimes and his crew, but Grimes finds Mark's behavior strange and decides to investigate further.

Grimes visits Callie at the prison, but she cannot reveal the truth because Clone Mark will kill the real Mark if she tells anyone that he framed her. Grimes goes to Mark's apartment and discovers the real Mark tied up in his own closet. However, Clone Mark appears behind him and shoots him in both his legs. Grimes, as he tries to fire back, ends up blinding himself. Clone Mark has grown tired of bowling and decides to leave the city. The next day, the real Mark tries to free Callie from prison, but he must find evidence to prove her innocence. Mark finds his clone at a tropical island, where he confesses that he killed Tad. The clone is then gassed to death and his body is scrapped for parts, which gives Grimes new legs and eyes. At the bowling tournament, Mark wonders where his clone came from, and Callie says that he "will never know".

== Production ==
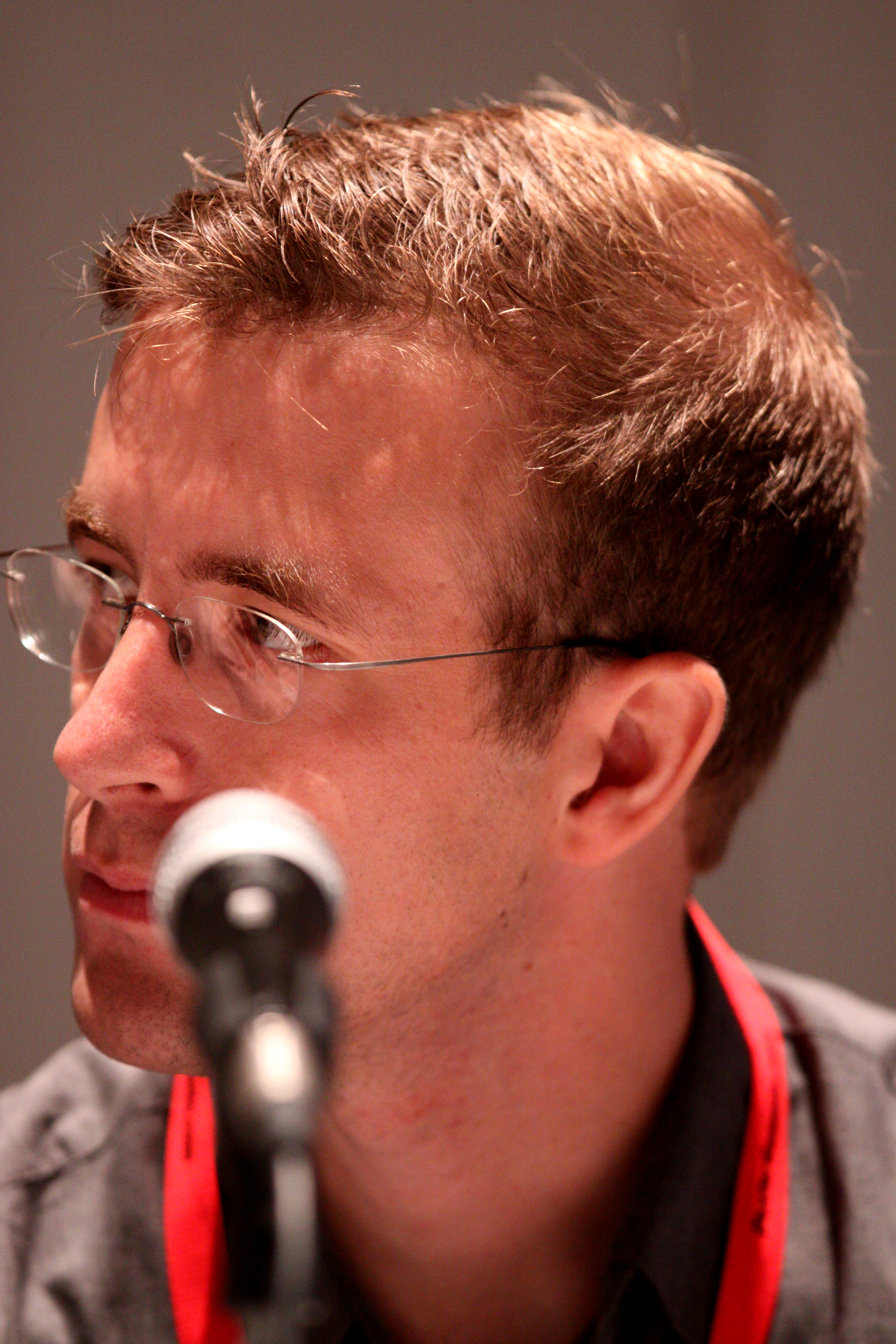
Series creator Devin Clark commented that Matt Oberg (pictured) voiced Clone Mark as "much more gruff individual" compared to the real Mark.

Initially titled "The Clone Wars", the episode's title was later changed to "Attack of Mark's Clone". Series developer David M. Stern wrote the episode with Adam Stein, and Richard Ferguson-Hull and series creator Devin Clark directed it. Stein and Mick Kelly served as staff writers. In an interview with Kevin Fitzpatrick of UGO, Clark spoke of the episode and proclaimed that it was a "really fun opportunity" to see what Mark's clone would be like, calling him an "Agro-Mark". He said that Matt Oberg, the voice of Mark, voiced the clone as a "much more gruff individual". Clark elaborated, "It's really funny. It's like seeing Mark, since we kind of play him so neutered most of the time, it's like seeing him as like this jerk, it's hilarious, it's a very funny story." Executive producer Daniel Powell said that Clone Mark "glove slaps everyone [and smokes] a cigarette instead of putting it out before the office". "Attack of Mark's Clone" was the eighth episode to be produced for the second season. In addition to the regular cast, the episode features appearances by recurring guest voice actors Pete Holmes and Mike O'Gorman. Comedians Kate McKinnon and Jay Oakerson guest starred in the episode.

== Reception ==
The episode originally aired on Comedy Central in the United States on August 4, 2011. The episode was viewed by an estimated 730,000 viewers and received a 0.3 rating among adults between the ages of 18 and 49, according to Nielsen Media Research. This means that it was seen by 0.3% of all 18- to 49-year-olds. The episode marked a decrease in ratings from the previous episode, "The Ring of Powers", which scored a 0.4 rating and was watched by 870,000 viewers. The total viewership for "Attack of Mark's Clone" made it the season's least watched episode.

Critical reception of the episode was positive. Charles Webb of MTV Geek favored it over season one episodes, which emphasized "generating a gag a minute within a paper-thin plot". Webb wrote, "The Ugly Americans team has been on a roll much of this season, going three for three with this episode, last week's 'The Ring of Powers,' and the previous week's 'G.I. Twayne'." Ology writer Josh Harrison was also positive of the episode, rating it 7.7 out of 10 and writing: "'Attack of Mark's Clone' takes a pretty archetypal plotline—the evil duplicate—and translates it into the zany twisting storytelling we've come to know and love." Harrison praised the episode for giving viewers insight on the character Mark, and concluded: "This was a solid, if one-note, episode of Ugly Americans. The ongoing jokes ... helped shore up the limited scope of the situation."
