= Wet Hot Demonic Summer =

- Ugly Americans episode
- The wizards explain that the apprentices must be circumcised to get their wizard powers.
- Episode no.: Season 2 Episode 1
- Directed by: Aaron Augenblick
- Written by: Daniel Powell
- Production code: 203
- Original air date: June 30, 2011

Episode chronology
← Previous "The Manbirds"	Next → "Callie and Her Sister"

"Wet Hot Demonic Summer" is the second season premiere of the American animated television series Ugly Americans, and the fifteenth overall episode of the series. It originally aired on Comedy Central in the United States on June 30, 2011. In the episode, Leonard Powers is about to retire as the Wizard of Social Services and give the job to his apprentice, Lionel, whom he abandoned fifty years prior. Meanwhile, Twayne Boneraper and Callie Maggotbone must infiltrate the compound where the wizards hold the initiation ritual, but their complicated strategy involves building a summer camp with Mark Lilly as the head counselor.

The episode was written by Daniel Powell and directed by Aaron Augenblick. Powell was inspired to write the episode after reading a critic's review of the series; the critic referred to Leonard as having "omnipotence", which spurred an idea involving the character having to take responsibility. "Wet Hot Demonic Summer" parodies the Harry Potter series, particularly the character design of Lionel. The Harry Potter elements were planned nine months in advance to coincide with the release of Harry Potter and the Deathly Hallows – Part 2, which premiered two weeks after the episode aired.

"Wet Hot Demonic Summer" received generally positive reviews from television critics; several commentators praised its cultural references and claimed that it showed similar quality to that of the series' first season. According to Nielsen Media Research, "Wet Hot Demonic Summer" was watched by 1.14 million viewers in its original airing and attracted less viewers than the series' pilot episode.

== Plot ==
Leonard Powers, the Wizard of Social Services, is about to retire and takes his apprentice to Mount Magic to complete the initiation ceremony. For a wizard to retire, they must hatch their apprentice from an egg and train them for fifty years. However, Leonard abandoned his apprentice, the Harry Potter-like Lionel (voiced by Thomas Middleditch), in Chinatown and did not contact him until the ceremony. Later, it is revealed that to become a wizard, the apprentices must be circumcised. Meanwhile, the demons—the wizard's enemies—are ready to attack Mount Magic, but a force field is keeping them out. Since Leonard still needs to sign his retirement forms, demons Twayne Boneraper and Callie Maggotbone decide to use Mark Lilly to lead them to Leonard. To get Mark to come along, they elect him as the camp leader for a summer camp (originally a mining camp) that they build nearby. Mark brings his students from the Department of Integration to the camp, and the devil, Aldermach, brings several demons to act like the camp's visitors. The department's police officer, Frank Grimes, also comes along, but runs away to live with bears as he thinks the camp is infested by vermin. Mark's students and his roommate, the zombie Randall, begin to mine in an old silver mine. However, they get trapped inside, but Doug the koala begins to dig them out.

At Mount Magic, Lionel is upset because Leonard abandoned him, and goes outside to the balcony, where he spots Callie swimming in the lake while wearing a bikini, and he declares that "she will be mine". Mark arrives at the lake and sees Leonard from the balcony and tells him that he forgot to sign his retirement forms. Leonard explains how to come to the secret entrance to Mark, which the demons hear. Later, Mark meets Leonard and Lionel at the entrance, where he signs his forms and is ready to retire. Moments later, when initiation ceremony begins at Mount Magic, the demons invade the compound and a battle between wizards and demons commences, while Lionel runs away to be with Callie, who, being the camp's "sexy counselor", has sex with him before Mark interrupts. Grimes arrives with his army of bears and soon thereafter, Doug arrives in a hole that he dug; the hole collapses the floor and all the demons and bears are consumed by it. As the battle ends, the sun goes down and it is too late for Lionel to be circumcised and take over as the Wizard of Social Services, so Leonard continues to work and begins to raise a new egg.

== Production ==
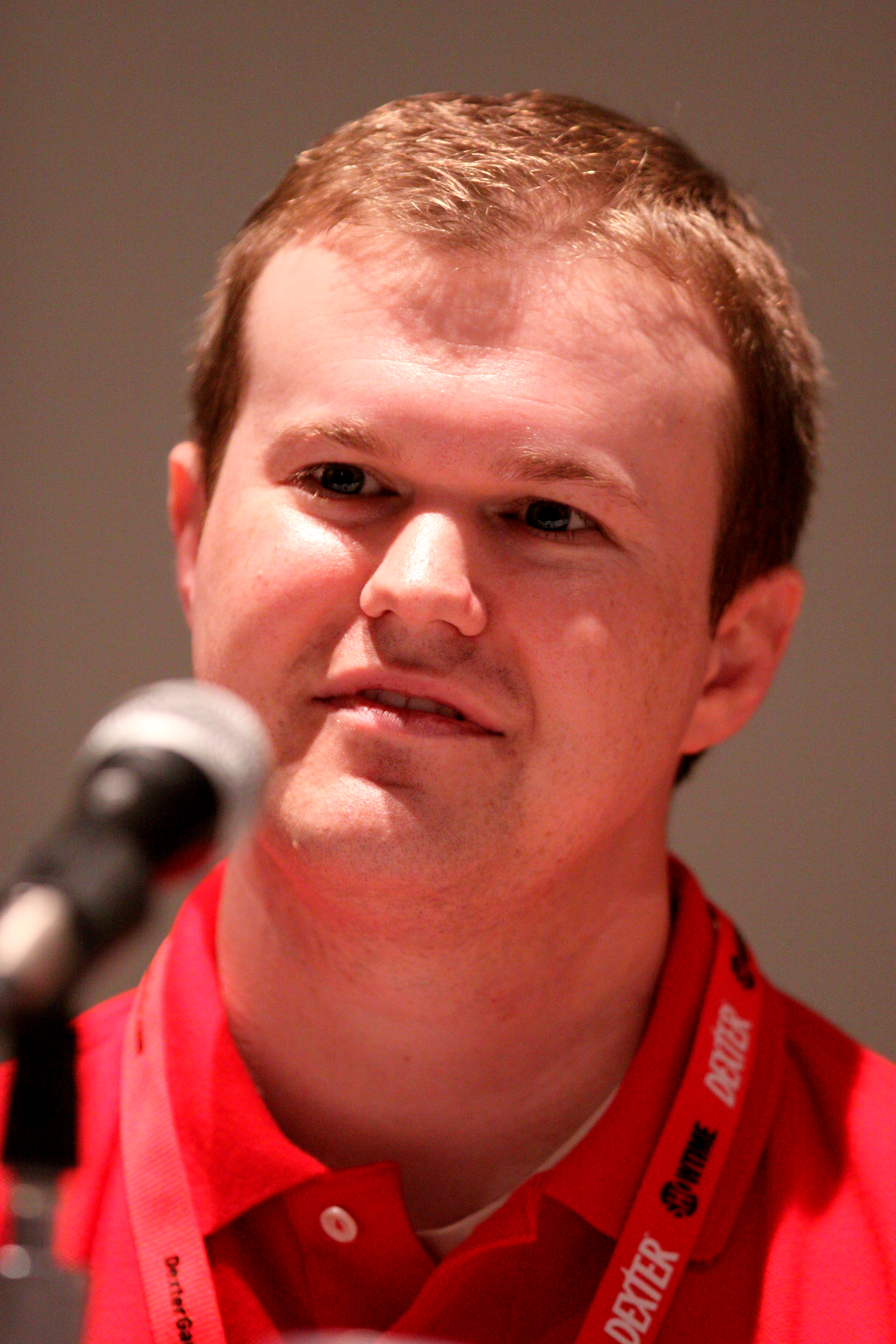
Daniel Powell wrote "Wet Hot Demonic Summer".

"Wet Hot Demonic Summer" was written by Daniel Powell and directed by Aaron Augenblick. Series creator Devin Clark said that they planned on giving it a summer theme since they knew it would air in the summer. Clark further elaborated on the decision to incorporate summer and Harry Potter themes into the episode, stating: "We went, 'alright, those are two little nuggets of ideas we can incorporate into that.' We can't be as relevant to pop culture as some other shows, but it just means we have a little more of a challenge of making jokes that are a little more evergreen and poking fun of the genre in a much broader spectrum." Screenwriter Powell explained that it is difficult for the series to do "topical stuff" as it takes up to nine months to complete an episode, but they were aware of the fact that the Harry Potter and the Deathly Hallows – Part 2 would premiere shortly after the episode was set to air. "So it would seem like we were hyper-topical, even though we had a good nine months advance notice", he said. Powell said that they included famous wizards from many other sources, including The Lord of the Rings and The Wonderful Wizard of Oz. In an interview with Charles Webb of MTV, Clark elaborated: "We make it a hodgepodge of the wizard references and obviously the main one is, and the most prominent one and the one that's most relevant to pop culture is the Harry Potter spoof that we've thrown in there.

The episode explores Leonard's background and that he is "essentially a deadbeat dad". In an interview with Matt Barone of the magazine Complex, Powell revealed that he was inspired to write the episode after reading a critic's review which referred to Leonard as "basically [having] omnipotence" as he is able to conjure any magic he wants, but is too lazy to take advantage of his powers. The review spurred an idea for an episode where Leonard would be responsible for dealing with a kid. Powell called the episode's mythology "very bizarre and surreal", but said that they tried to keep the core themes relatable, such as Leonard's relationship with his estranged son. The same day as the episode's original broadcast, a deleted scene from "Wet Hot Demonic Summer" was made available on the official Ugly Americans website. In the half-minute clip, Grimes is shown settling into living his life as a bear.

== Reception ==
The episode originally aired on Comedy Central in the United States on June 30, 2011, following the Futurama episode "Ghost in the Machines". According to Nielsen Media Research, "Wet Hot Demonic Summer" was watched by 1.14 million viewers, compared to the 1.92 million who watched Futurama. The episode also acquired a 0.5 rating among viewers between the ages of 18 and 49. This means that 0.5% of all 18- to 49-year-olds viewed the episode. It dropped in viewership compared to the series' pilot episode, which attracted 2.10 million viewers and acquired a 1.1 rating. "Wet Demonic Summer" also marked a drop in ratings compared to the first-season finale, "The Manbirds", which received a 0.7 rating.

"Wet Hot Demonic Summer" received generally positive reviews from critics. David Hinckley of New York Daily News rated it four out of five stars and commented that although it may not make sense to some viewers, it is "equally possible they will keep watching anyway because the jokes work so well all by themselves". Hinckley went on to remark that "Ugly Americans packs a lot into 21 or 22 minutes. Happily, its often droll and deadpan style makes it easy to watch even if some of the references are whizzing by unappreciated". RedEye critic Curt Wagner rated it three stars out of four and wrote that it includes "visual pizzazz", cultural references and "so-fast-you'll-miss-them jokes" that it might require multiple viewings. Wagner, however, meant that this was a rather positive feature, writing: "For example, you might be laughing so hard at what just happened that you miss a fun line..." Lastly, Wagner observed that "Ugly Americans can be gross and bizarre, but everything makes sense in the world that it has created".

Josh Harrison of Ology deemed the episode a "good sign" that the second season will be "just as good, if not better" than the first season. He said, "The way it all works together in this episode ... is subtle and surprising but nevertheless convincing evidence that there's method to the madness. Ugly Americans knows when to play this card; at all other junctures, it's got the right instinct when it shows us yet more madness." Harrison praised the battle scene between the wizards and the demons, calling it "one of the best single sequences in the series so far". In contrast, The Standard-Times critic Kevin McDonough was more critical regarding the episode, noting that it "tries a tad too hard". McDonough commented: "The efforts to meld 1980s summer-camp fantasy comedies with the Harry Potter movies are more odd than amusing. Then again, that pretty much sums up Ugly Americans itself."
