= Ride Me to Hell =

- Ugly Americans episode
- Mark finds out that Grimes was dishonorably discharged from the police force.
- Episode no.: Season 2 Episode 3
- Directed by: Aaron Augenblick; Devin Clark
- Written by: Mike Rowe
- Production code: 205
- Original air date: July 14, 2011

Episode chronology
← Previous "Callie and Her Sister"	Next → "G.I. Twayne"

"Ride Me to Hell" is the third episode of the second season of the American animated television series Ugly Americans, and the seventeenth overall episode of the series. It originally aired on Comedy Central in the United States on July 14, 2011. In the episode, Grimes is outraged by the unsatisfying ending of his favorite television series, and Mark helps him unravel his attachment to the series while uncovering several deep-seated memories. Meanwhile, Callie is expected to take over as the leader of Hell from her father, but is unwilling to do so.

The episode was written by Mike Rowe and directed by Aaron Augenblick and series creator Devin Clark. While the series' first season mainly referenced horror films, "Ride Me to Hell" pays homage to 1970s cop shows. Clark used Grimes unleashing his memories from the 1970s as an opportunity to parody cop shows such as CHiPs and Starsky and Hutch. According to Nielsen Media Research, "Ride Me to Hell" was watched by 814,000 viewers in its original airing, a slight drop in total viewership when compared to previous episodes. The episode received positive reviews.

== Plot ==
Frank Grimes' favorite television series, Dishonorable Discharge, ends after six seasons and it is revealed that the entire series was just an angel's dream. Grimes is outraged and determined to change the ending. Later, Mark Lilly tells his girlfriend, the half-demon Callie Maggotbone, that he has not seen his father since his sixth birthday. Mark's roommate, the zombie Randall, is touched by this and decides to document Mark's journey to find his father, so that he can become a Hollywood director. Mark is assigned by Twayne Boneraper to investigate Grimes, who has been busting people who enjoyed the ending of Dishonorable Discharge. He and Randall (who documents everything with his video camera) ride along with Grimes. In a memory sequence of Grimes', it is revealed that he was a real cop in the 1970s and worked with an undercover expert named Jimmy. He was dishonorably discharged from the force and repressed all of his memories of being a cop. Mark figures that this is why he is so angry with the ending of the series, and takes him through his past by using the same car Grimes and his partner Jimmy had. In the car, Grimes has a memory sequence again and drives to Hollywood.

Meanwhile, Aldermach Maggotbone is ready to hand over his title as the leader of Hell to his daughter, Callie. However, Callie does not want to take over his job. A competition is held to choose which one will overtake the title and Callie tries to lose every challenge, but Twayne makes sure that she wins each time. At the studio where Dishonorable Discharge was filmed, Grimes forces some bystanders to act in his ending of the series, which reveals the memory Grimes had repressed: While trying to take down Aldermach when he became the new leader of Hell, Grimes accidentally killed a disguised Jimmy. In present time, Mark, Grimes and Randall head back to New York to sabotage the new ceremony. At the ceremony, Aldermach unexpectedly chooses to give the Slitherix (a big snake one has to swallow to become the leader of Hell) to his secretary, Cathy, to spare Callie from getting the job. Just as Cathy is about to receive the snake, Grimes crashes the car into the church and shoots her. It is then revealed that she is really Grimes' old partner Jimmy, who had worked undercover in Hell for 35 years. Embarrassed, Grimes begins to repress his memories again, which Mark believes is for the best. The episode ends with an angel waking up, suggesting that the episode was her dream.

== Production ==
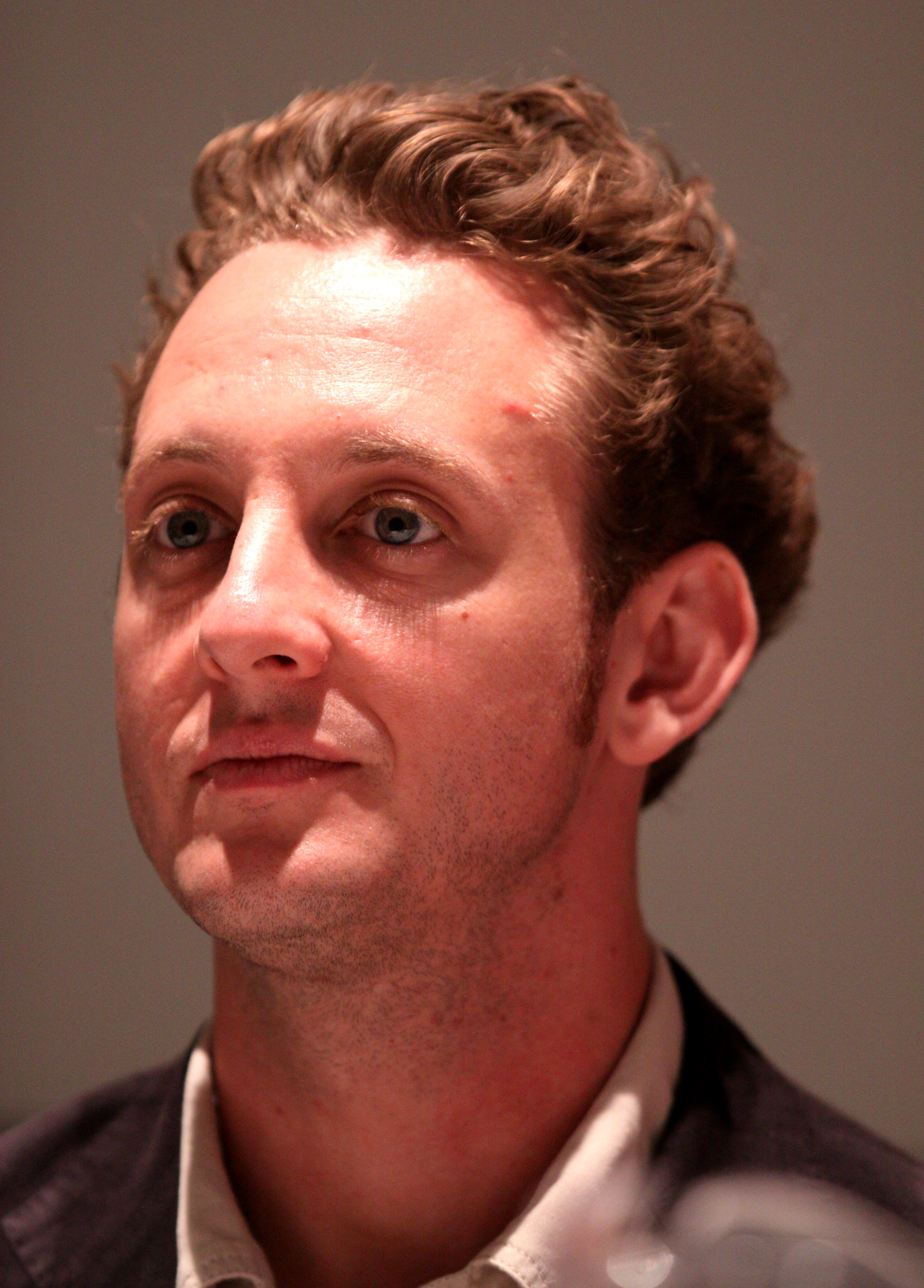
Aaron Augenblick co-directed "Ride Me to Hell".

"Ride Me to Hell" was written by Mike Rowe and directed by Aaron Augenblick and series creator Devin Clark. Screenwriter and executive producer Daniel Powell said that the episode explores "a little bit more" about Mark's background, particularly that his father left him when he was younger, and that it "sort of informs why he became a social worker". Unlike the series' first season, which paid homage mainly to horror films, season two referenced a variety of genres. In an interview with Matt Barone of the magazine Complex, Clark used "Ride Me to Hell" as an example that the season "taps into a little bit beyond the horror culture". He referred it to as "one of our big episodes" and stated that it references contemporary shows with "unsatisfied endings", such as Monk and Lost. In the episode, Grimes unleashes memories of being a cop in the 1970s, which Clark saw as an opportunity to make fun of 1970s cop shows, such as CHiPs and Starsky and Hutch. He said, "It's always a fun opportunity to see what other worlds I can pull from, even beyond horror. We had some really fun opportunities this season to pull from old '70s cop shows. ... So, it's fun for me just to step out and try lots of different styles and looks. I'm excited for whatever the writers throw at me, thematically. It's just a new opportunity to try something different." "Ride Me to Hell" was the fifth episode to be produced for the second season. In addition to the regular cast, the episode features appearances by recurring guest voice actors Pete Holmes, Julie Klausner and Mike O'Gorman.

== Reception ==
The episode originally aired in the United States on Comedy Central on July 14, 2011. According to Nielsen Media Research, it was watched by 814,000 viewers and acquired a 0.4 rating in the 18–49 demographic. The episode slightly dropped in terms of total viewership from the previous episode, "Callie and Her Sister", which was watched by 980,000 viewers. "Ride Me to Hell" received a positive review from Ology's Josh Harrison, who commented that it "successfully redeemed" the character Grimes, who was his least-favorite character up until this episode. Harrison wrote, "I'm thrilled to see Grimes shine in his starring role. Admittedly this episode was a bit light on isolated funny incidents ... but Randall's director-speak was a solid throughline, and I'm always happy to see more demon politics." Harrison graded the episode 8.7 out of 10 and remarked that "it was a cut above its predecessors this season, but still a bit shy of the very best UA [episodes]".
