= Teenage Euthanasia =

American adult animated sitcom

- Genre: Adult animation; Animated sitcom; Black comedy; Fantasy
- Created by: Alyson Levy; Alissa Nutting
- Voices of: Jo Firestone; Maria Bamford; Tim Robinson; Bebe Neuwirth
- Opening theme: "I'm Coming Home Again" performed by Maria Bamford
- Composer: Heather Christian
- Country of origin: United States
- Original language: English
- No. of seasons: 2
- No. of episodes: 17

Production
- Executive producers: Alyson Levy; Alissa Nutting; Lisa M. Thomas; Vernon Chatman; John Lee; Scott Adsit (season 2); For Williams Street: Keith Crofford (season 1); Walter Newman (season 1); Ollie Green (season 2); Cameron Tang (season 2)
- Producers: Scott Adsit (season 1); Aaron Augenblick (season 1); Jo Firestone (season 2)
- Editors: Daniel Bellury; Ryan Spears
- Running time: 22 minutes
- Production companies: PFFR; Augenblick Studios (season 1); Atomic Cartoons (season 2); Williams Street

Original release
- Network: Adult Swim
- Release: September 6, 2021 – September 28, 2023

Teenage Euthanasia is an American adult animated sitcom created by Alyson Levy and Alissa Nutting for Cartoon Network's nighttime programming block Adult Swim. The series stars Maria Bamford, Jo Firestone, Tim Robinson and Bebe Neuwirth. The series premiered on September 6, 2021. (Note: Adult Swim lists the series as having an sneak peek premiere on September 5, 2021 at 12:00 a.m. (24:00) EDT/PDT, which is effectively September 6.)

On March 31, 2022, it was announced the series has been renewed for a second season. A preview of season two was shown during April Fools' Day 2023. The second season premiered on July 27, 2023, and concluded on September 28, 2023.

In May 2025, after almost two years of silence since the conclusion of the second season, the series was quietly canceled as per an update on the show's Instagram bio.

== Premise ==
In the near future, Trophy Fantasy is a teenage mother who left her baby daughter Euthanasia "Annie" Fantasy in the custody of her undertaker mother Baba and her half-brother Pete at their funeral home Tender Endings in Fort Gator, Florida. Following a devastating divorce from her husband and death from an overdose 15 years later, Trophy's corpse is delivered to Euthanasia at Tender Endings as her written demand to those who found her dead. After a freak combination of circumstances that involved Baba's embalming fluid, Annie's tear, and lightning from a thunderstorm that was occurring during the embalming process, Trophy revives as a sentient zombie with paranormal abilities and the use of crotch beetles. Some episodes end with a post-credits stinger.

== Voice cast ==
- Jo Firestone as Euthanasia "Annie" Fantasy
- Maria Bamford as Trophy Fantasy
- Tim Robinson as Uncle Pete, Robot Pete (in "A Very Fantasy Vacation")
- Bebe Neuwirth as Baba, Robot Baba (in "A Very Fantasy Vacation")

=== Additional voices ===
- Scott Adsit as Dirk (in "Nobody Beats the Baba"), Mortician (in "Nobody Beats the Baba"), Florida Man (in "Teen Eggs and Scram"), Waiter (in "Teen Eggs and Scram"), Petetini (in "Adventures in Beetle Sitting"), Whiskey Host (in "Adventures in Beetle Sitting"), Coach Crumb (in "Dada M.I.A."), Greek Man (in "Dada M.I.A."), Party Guest #2 (in "Remember Fun?"), Various Old Slavic Men (in "Mother's Day"), Grocery Store Worker (in "Radio Frankenstein"), Attitude Teacher (in "Sexually Educated"), Old Patient #3 (in "CARS 4"), Various Sweet Creamers Players (in "A League of His Own"), Landlord (in "It Happening!!! (Jellybean's Birthday)"), Customer #3 (in "A Waist-Down Ghost Town Shut Down"), Barry (in "A Very Fantasy Vacation")
- Ozioma Akagha as Security Guard (in "Suddenly Susan"), Louise (in "Suddenly Susan"), Customer #2 (in "A Waist-Down Ghost Town Shut Down")
- Philip Anthony-Rodriguez as Jogger (in "Dada M.I.A."), Gardener (in "Dada M.I.A.")
- Sander Argabrite as Various Cadavers Players (in "A League of His Own"), Kid at Funeral (in "A Waist-Down Ghost Town Shut Down")
- Barron B. Bass as PJ Flapps Commercial Announcer (in "Viva La Flappanista")
- Sandra Bauleo as Crying Party Girl (in "The Bad Bang Theory"), Clive (in "A League of His Own" and "A Waist-Down Ghost Town Shut Down")
- H. Jon Benjamin as Gregory Commercial Announcer (in "Adventures in Beetle Sitting"), Dr. Whammy (in "Viva La Flappanista"), Fumigator (in "A Very Fantasy Vacation")
- Kevin Breznahan as Bounty Hunter's Son (in "A Very Fantasy Vacation")
- Kallee Brookes as Babygirl
- Aidy Bryant
- Tiana Camacho as Prison Guard (in "The Bad Bang Theory"), Worker Beetle (in "Adventures in Beetle Sitting"), Young Trophy (in "Remember Fun?"), Death Row Inmate (in "A League of His Own")
- Jordan Carlos as Lester Cuddlefish (in "Nobody Beats the Baba" and "Teen Eggs and Scram"), Die Fieri (in "Nobody Beats the Baba"), Robocop (in "Teen Eggs and Scram"), Deacon (in "First Date with the Second Coming"), Nipsey Hussle (in "First Date with the Second Coming"), Luke Perry (in "First Date with the Second Coming"), Mail Carrier (in "Adventures in Beetle Sitting" and "Dada M.I.A."), Denzel (in "Adventures in Beetle Sitting"), California Raisin (in "Dada M.I.A."), PJ Flapps Commercial End Warning Announcer (in "Viva La Flappanista"), Pete's Friend #1 (in "Viva La Flappanista"), Baseball Scout (in "A League of His Own"), News Reporter (in "A Waist-Down Ghost Town Shut Down"), Driver #2 (in "A Very Fantasy Vacation")
- Tony Cavalero as Lonny (in "Nobody Beats the Baba" and "Dada M.I.A."), Gator Trainer (in "Dada M.I.A"), Sal (in "Viva La Flappanista"), Pete's Friend #3 (in "A Waist-Down Ghost Town Shut Down"), Grieving Man (in "A Waist-Down Ghost Town Shut Down")
- Vernon Chatman as Succotash (in "First Date with the Second Coming" and "Radio Frankenstein"), Charlie Pants (in "First Date with the Second Coming")
- Christi Chiello as Shelly #2 (in "First Date with the Second Coming"), Shirts Don't Do It Computer (in "First Date with the Second Coming"), Mrs. Reynolds (in "First Date with the Second Coming"), Student (in "Mother's Day"), Woman (in "Sexually Educated")
- Lori Tan Chinn as Mr. Kim (in "Sexually Educated")
- Steve Cirbus as Sgt. Bambino (in "Mother's Day"), Drone (in "A Very Fantasy Vacation")
- Wyatt Cirbus as Solomon (in "A Very Fantasy Vacation"), Other Kid (in "A Very Fantasy Vacation")
- Stephen Colbert as Announcer (in "Dada M.I.A.")
- Carrie Coon as Michelle's Mother (in "Viva La Flappanista")
- Miles Coreas as Various Cadavers Players (in "A League of His Own")
- David Cross as Video Doctor (in "Sexually Educated")
- Victor Cruz as Alfredo (in "Radio Frankenstein")
- Kieran Culkin as Ref Mazos (in "A Waist-Down Ghost Town Shut Down")
- Jamie Demetriou as Conceived in Orlando Member #2 (in "Sexually Educated")
- Natasia Demetriou as Svetlana (in "Suddenly Susan")
- Loretta Devine as God (in "First Date with the Second Coming")
- Kristin Dodson as Frank's Daughter #1 (in "Radio Frankenstein"), Young Trophy (in "Remember Fun?")
- Ann Dowd as Erica (in "Sexually Educated"), Debt Announcer (in "A Very Fantasy Vacation")
- Cole Escola as Dillan Jeremy (in "First Date with the Second Coming"), BJ Educator (in "Adventures in Beetle Sitting"), Waiter (in "Adventures in Beetle Sitting"), Mustached Teacher Model (in "Sexually Educated"), Mr. Tyler (in "CARS 4"), Nurse #2 (in "CARS 4"), Mirror (in "It Happening!!! (Jellybean's Birthday)")
- Noel Fielding as Conceived in Orlando Member #1 (in "Sexually Educated")
- Leo Fitzpatrick as Normal Guy (in "Nobody Beats the Baba"), Guy in Bunny Costume (in "Radio Frankenstein"), Bounty Hunter (in "A Very Fantasy Vacation")
- Caleb Foote as Carnival Worker (in "Mother's Day"), Beck (in "Mother's Day"), Mr. Tyler's Son (in "CARS 4")
- John Gemberling as Joey Bennett (in "Nobody Beats the Baba" and "A Waist-Down Ghost Town Shut Down"), Cheer Dad (in "Dada M.I.A.")
- Paul Giamatti as Vic (in "CARS 4")
- Jon Glaser as Principal Schepler (in "Remember Fun?")
- Ilana Glazer
- Kimiko Glenn as Monotonee
- Harvey Guillén
- Ashleigh Crystal Hairston as Shayla (in "First Date with the Second Coming"), Shelly #1 (in "First Date with the Second Coming")
- Bonita Hamilton as The Mer (in "First Date with the Second Coming")
- Jerome Harmann-Hardeman as Weeping Willy (in "The Bad Bang Theory")
- Patti Harrison as Eternitee (in "Teen Eggs and Scram")
- Tim Heidecker as Edu-Mart Announcer (in "Sexually Educated")
- Jackie Hoffman as Ooga (in "Remember Fun?" and "It Happening!!! (Jellybean's Birthday)"), Baba's Daughter (in "Mother's Day")
- Sarunas Jackson as Reginald Val Johnstone (in "A League of His Own")
- Janelle James as Jill (in "Remember Fun?"), Ebony (in "CARS 4")
- Tommie Earl Jenkins as Darius (in "A League of His Own"), Announcer for Succotash and The Mer (in "A League of His Own")
- Matt Jones as Keith (in "Mother's Day")
- Orlando Jones as Little Flor-Ida (in "The Bad Bang Theory" and "A League of His Own")
- Loris Anne Jones-Randolph as Health Personnel (in "CARS 4"), Female Car (in "CARS 4"), Hospital Speaker (in "CARS 4")
- Kody Kavitha as Carmen (in "Suddenly Susan"), Video actresses (in "Sexually Educated")
- David Kaye as Umpire (in "A League of His Own"), Old Man (in "A League of His Own")
- Christopher Knowings as Dushane (in "First Date with the Second Coming")
- Violet Krumbein as Jacuzzi (in "The Bad Bang Theory"), Party Girl (in "The Bad Bang Theory")
- Heather Lawless as Mrs. Clomid (in "Teen Eggs and Scram"), Computer (in "Teen Eggs and Scram"), Frank's Daughter #2 (in "Radio Frankenstein"), Goldie (in "CARS 4"), Mrs. Tyler (in "CARS 4")
- John Lee as Goat (in various episodes), Various Old Slavic Men (in "Mother's Day"), Various Sweet Creamers Players (in "A League of His Own"), Crocodile Grandfather (in "A Very Fantasy Vacation")
- Mela Lee as Elizabeth (in "The Bad Bang Theory"), Inmate #1 (in "The Bad Bang Theory"), Plastic Surgeon (in "CARS 4"), Driver #1 (in "A Very Fantasy Vacation"), Model #2 (in "A Very Fantasy Vacation")
- Phaedra Lee as Child (in "Nobody Beats the Baba"), Commercial Child #1 (in "Dada M.I.A."), Mystery Caller (in "Radio Frankenstein"), PJ Flapps Commercial Actress #3 (in "Viva La Flappanista")
- Sookie Lee as Pete Jr. (in "Suddenly Susan"), Commercial Child #2 (in "Dada M.I.A."), Woman on Line (in "Mother's Day"), Old Woman #2 (in "A League of His Own"), Child (in "A Waist-Down Ghost Town Shut Down")
- Alyson Levy as Pregnant Sarah (in "Teen Eggs and Scram"), Janitor (in "First Date with the Second Coming"), Hologram Mary (in "Dada M.I.A."), Beetle #2 (in "Remember Fun?"), Slavic Women (in "Mother's Day"), Kristin (in "Radio Frankenstein"), Female Teacher Model (in "Sexually Educated"), Maryl (in "Sexually Educated" and "It Happening!!! (Jellybean's Birthday)"), PJ Flapps Commercial Actress #2 (in "Viva La Flappanista"), Babygirl's Mother (in "Viva La Flappanista"), Old Woman #1 (in "A League of His Own"), Jellybean (in "It Happening!!! (Jellybean's Birthday)"), Terratoma (in "It Happening!!! (Jellybean's Birthday)"), Old Woman (in "A Waist-Down Ghost Town Shut Down"), Valerie (in "A Waist-Down Ghost Town Shut Down")
- Courtney Lin as Annie's Baby (in "Mother's Day")
- Priscilla Lopez as Oola (in "Remember Fun?" and "It Happening!!! (Jellybean's Birthday)")
- Neil Magnuson as Sophie Fan (in "Nobody Beats the Baba"), Commentator (in "A League of His Own"), Greg (in "A Waist-Down Ghost Town Shut Down")
- Max Malas as Commercial Child #3 (in "Dada M.I.A.")
- Taryn Manning as Infinitee (in various episodes), Ms. McGillicuddy (in "A Waist-Down Ghost Town Shut Down")
- Anthony Lee Medina as Ralph Jr. (in "Suddenly Susan", "Sexually Educated", "It Happening!!! (Jellybean's Birthday)")
- Cristin Milioti as Juggsaw (in "Viva La Flappanista")
- Eugene Mirman as Vladislav (in "Viva La Flappanista" and "It Happening!!! (Jellybean's Birthday)")
- Misty Monroe as Orange (in "The Bad Bang Theory")
- Jinkx Monsoon as Gyro Saleswoman (in "A Very Fantasy Vacation")
- Lily D. Moore as Safety Pin
- Reed Northup as Javi (in "Adventures in Beetle Sitting", "Radio Frankenstein" and "It Happening!!! (Jellybean's Birthday)"), Ivan (in "Sexually Educated")
- Alissa Nutting as Candle Saleswoman (in "Nobody Beats the Baba"), Party Guest (in "Remember Fun?"), Beetle #1 (in "Remember Fun?"), Student #1 (in "Mother's Day"), Michelle (in "Viva La Flappanista"), Front Cashier (in "A Very Fantasy Vacation"), Golfing Woman (in "A Very Fantasy Vacation"), Model #1 (in "A Very Fantasy Vacation")
- Sparrow Nutting as Crocodile Child (in "A Very Fantasy Vacation")
- Conner O'Malley as Lonely Man (in "Adventures in Beetle Sitting"), Video Actor #1 (in "Sexually Educated"), Football Player (in "Sexually Educated"), Markey (in "It Happening!!! (Jellybean's Birthday)")
- Patton Oswalt
- Joe Pera as Bucky (in "Mother's Day")
- Edi Patterson as Sophie (in "Nobody Beats the Baba", "Dada M.I.A." and "Remember Fun?")
- Ben Platt as Phineas (in "Sexually Educated")
- Lorelei Ramirez as A.I. Operator (in "First Date with the Second Coming"), Shelly #3 (in "First Date with the Second Coming"), Frank (in "Radio Frankenstein"), Pete's Friend #2 (in "A Waist-Down Ghost Town Shut Down"), Mayor Todd (in "A Waist-Down Ghost Town Shut Down")
- Chris Redd as Dr. Gush Gibson (in "CARS 4")
- Vaughan Reilly as Bully (in "Radio Frankenstein"), Nadiya (in "A League of His Own")
- John Reynolds as Van (in "Mother's Day")
- Judith Roberts as Noona (in "Remember Fun?" and "It Happening!!! (Jellybean's Birthday)"), Old Woman in PJ Flapps Commercial (in "Viva La Flappanista")
- Bumper Robinson as Server (in "Nobody Beats the Baba"), Hologram Judge (in "Teen Eggs and Scram" and "The Bad Bang Theory"), Scientist (in "Teen Eggs and Scram"), Ralph Sr. (in "Suddenly Susan"), Hologram Doug (in "Dada M.I.A."), Police Officer (in "Dada M.I.A."), Baby Collector (in "Mother's Day"), Picture of Goat (in "Sexually Educated"), Old Patient #2 (in "CARS 4"), Barry (in "A Waist-Down Ghost Town Shut Down"), Customer #1 (in "A Waist-Down Ghost Town Shut Down"), Guy in Bathroom Stall (in "A Very Fantasy Vacation")
- William Salyers as Security Guard (in "First Date with the Second Coming"), Stephen Hawking (in "First Date with the Second Coming"), Extreme Voice (in "First Date with the Second Coming"), Baba's Boyfriend (in "CARS 4"), Wedding App Person (in "CARS 4"), Old Man (in "A Waist-Down Ghost Town Shut Down")
- Yamaneika Saunders
- Kristen Schaal as Norma the Crotch Beetle (in "Adventures in Beetle Sitting")
- Ayla Schwartz as Frank's Daughter #3 (in "Radio Frankenstein")
- Rachel Sennott as Mindy (in "Radio Frankenstein"), Dr. Brittany St. Clair (in "CARS 4"), Victim's Wife (in "CARS 4")
- Joseph Sikora as Kirk (in "Viva La Flappanista"), Creepy Man (in "A Waist-Down Ghost Town Shut Down")
- Ben Sinclair as Kirk (in "Dada M.I.A."), Dirk (in "Dada M.I.A."), Pete's Friend #2 (in "Viva La Flappanista")
- J. Smith-Cameron as Marnie (in "Mother's Day")
- Jack Stanton as Old Patient #1 (in "CARS 4"),
- Estella Stuart as Crocodile Child (in "A Very Fantasy Vacation")
- Veronica S. Taylor as Video Actor #2 (in "Sexually Educated"), STD (in "Sexually Educated"), Attitude Students (in "Sexually Educated"), Nurse #1 (in "CARS 4")
- Cheryl Texiera as Harrison's Mother (in "Viva La Flappanista")
- Andrew Tull as Various Cadavers Players (in "A League of His Own")
- Corin Wells as Mimi Cuddlefish (in "Nobody Beats the Baba" and "Teen Eggs and Scram"), Old Mourning Woman (in "Teen Eggs and Scram"), Pregnant Maya (in "Teen Eggs and Scram"), Various Students (in "Sexually Educated"), Pete's Friend #1 (in "A Waist-Down Ghost Town Shut Down")
- Cesili Williams as Daiquari (in "The Bad Bang Theory"), DJ DOJ (in "The Bad Bang Theory")
- CJ Wilson as Pete Sr. (in "Dada M.I.A."), Hologram Pete (in "Dada M.I.A.")
- Susan Wokoma as Conceived in Orlando Member #3 (in "Sexually Educated")
- Marc Wootton as The Reaper (in "A Very Fantasy Vacation"), Religious Husband (in "A Very Fantasy Vacation")
- Anne Yatco as PJ Flapps Commercial Actress #1 (in "Viva La Flappanista")
- Ziwe as AI Sex Store Girl (in "Sexually Educated"), Casino Eyebrow Technician (in "A Very Fantasy Vacation"), Swimsuit Model #3 (in "A Very Fantasy Vacation")

== Episodes ==
Season	Episodes	Originally released	
Season	Episodes	First released	Last released
1	7	September 6, 2021	October 18, 2021
2	10	July 27, 2023	September 28, 2023

=== Season 1 (2021) ===
No. overall	No. in season	Title	Directed by	Written by	Original release date	US viewers (millions)
1	1	"Nobody Beats the Baba"	Alyson Levy	Caitie Delaney & Alyson Levy	September 6, 2021	0.489
The family goes to an embalming fluid convention so Baba can enter her recipe for a chance to win an award. Annie develops a crush on the son of a rival contestant, who is also an old rival to Trophy. Uncle Pete gets trapped in a coffin at one of the booths as part of a sales pitch.
2	2	"Teen Eggs and Scram"	Alyson Levy & Scott Adsit	Alisa Nutting & Alyson Levy	September 20, 2021	0.304
Annie scores a date with a cute new boy in her class, only to find out that he's a staunch Christian. Uncle Pete attempts to purchase a new shirt without Baba breathing down his neck.
3	3	"First Date with the Second Coming"	Alyson Levy	Alyson Levy & Craig Rowin	September 20, 2021	0.267
Trophy and Annie are tasked with helping a group of teenage criminals rehabilitate themselves in order to clear Trophy's criminal record. Uncle Pete enters a polygamous relationship with an old couple who has recently lost their partner.
4	4	"The Bad Bang Theory"	Scott Adsit	Jordan Temple & Alissa Nutting	September 27, 2021	0.242
Trophy and Baba are arrested for an altercation resulting from a bad haircut, landing them a spot on a game show titled Top Felon. Uncle Pete tries to make Annie cry for the first time in years, hoping she can release her pent-up emotions.
5	5	"Suddenly Susan"	Scott Adsit	Alissa Nutting & Jamie Loftus	October 4, 2021	0.208
Trophy swaps souls with a corpse both to help Uncle Pete escape an arranged marriage and to get out of a birdwatching trip with Annie, but things get complicated when a random squirrel gets caught in the mix.
6	6	"Adventures in Beetle Sitting"	Alyson Levy	Alissa Nutting	October 11, 2021	0.214
Trophy goes on a date without her crotch beetles, failing to realize how much she truly needs them. Meanwhile, Annie is left in charge of babysitting the beetles, whose guidance ends up improving her social life.
7	7	"Dada M.I.A."	Scott Adsit	Jo Firestone	October 18, 2021	0.234
Trophy and Annie play a magical board game to figure out who Annie's father could be. Uncle Pete drags Baba along to try and find his own father.

=== Season 2 (2023) ===
No. overall	No. in season	Title	Directed by	Written by	Original release date	US viewers (millions)
8	1	"Remember Fun?"	Alyson Levy	Nicole Drespel & Alyson Levy	July 27, 2023	N/A
After CPS raises concerns about Annie's lack of interest in partying, Trophy brings her back in time to the parties she went to, in order to keep custody of her daughter. Uncle Pete gets jealous when Baba takes in a goat as her new sidekick and tags along to find out what activities they do in secret without him.
9	2	"Mother's Day"	Alyson Levy	Dan Licata	August 3, 2023	N/A
Trophy intends to spend her first Mother's Day with Annie, but the latter's school assignment, in the form of a sentient baby doll, messes up their plans. If the negligence meter on Annie's doll fills up by the end of the deadline, her eggs will be frozen permanently causing Trophy to go into the doll. Uncle Pete attempts to spend Mother's Day with Baba, who would rather go alone on a hunting trip as it brought back memories of when she gave birth to a child in the Shame Cave in the old country and the baby was stolen from her by a bear. He ends up abducted by a woman who has abducted three other males to raise as her own. Both stories collide when Baba rescues Pete and the woman is arrested. One of the captives helps set the doll back to its default setting as Trophy exits from the doll. Baba is pleased that both her kids are safe unlike the one she lost. Back in the old country, the Shame Cave is watched by the bear in question and a naked wild woman. In their discussion that is translated in subtitles, the bear does offer to the wild woman that she can return to the human community at any time. The wild woman states in the bear's language "After seeing human mothers in action, Baba did me a favor".
10	3	"Radio Frankenstein"	Scott Adsit	Monique Moses	August 10, 2023	N/A
Trophy resurrects a delivery man as a zombie who died in a filled sinkhole accident in order to nab the rear-enhancing leggings she ordered. She and Uncle Pete then attempt to turn her into a brand ambassador by recording videos of her in the leggings. Meanwhile, Annie forms a friendship with the undead driver and Baba becomes the new cohost of her favorite radio show.
11	4	"Sexually Educated"	Alyson Levy	Nicole Drespel & Alyson Levy	August 17, 2023	N/A
After the operators of the holo-teachers at Annie's school go on strike, the adults in the family are forced to fill in. Trophy becomes her daughter's Sex Ed teacher and unnerves the class with her overtly sex-positive attitude, Baba teaches Driver's Ed and forms a connection with one of her students, and Uncle Pete has to manage a delinquent rock band in 4-H.
12	5	"CARS 4"	Scott Adsit	Dan Licata	August 24, 2023	N/A
Following a car crash, Annie loses her memory and is roped into becoming a doctor with more self-confidence to boot. Trophy flirts with a terminal dementia patient in hopes of swiping his money. Uncle Pete forms a bond with his new rental car, an AI-powered limousine with ties to the mob.
13	6	"Viva La Flappanista"	Alissa Nutting	Jamie Loftus	August 31, 2023	N/A
Trophy and Annie visit a mother-and-daughter-exclusive clothing store, only to get trapped in a deadly game that tests their relationship. Trophy can't use her death powers at Annie's suggestion because today happens to be the crotch beetles' day off. Uncle Pete has an existential crisis after learning that Baba had him circumcised as an infant.
14	7	"A League of His Own"	Scott Adsit	Monique Moses	September 7, 2023	N/A
To try and bond more, Annie joins a youth baseball team while Uncle Pete signs on as their coach, but Pete starts to take his new job too seriously. Trophy falls in love with a wealthy widow who has a fetish for terminal women.
15	8	"It Happening!!! (Jellybean's Birthday)"	Alyson Levy	Jamie Loftus	September 14, 2023	N/A
Annie suddenly comes down with a family curse in the form of a sentient growth on her stomach, preventing her from attending the class hamster's birthday party. She is soon tempted to break the rules that keep the growth under control, given the benefits that come with it taking over her body.
16	9	"A Waist-Down Ghost Town Shut Down"	Alyson Levy	Alison Leiby & Alissa Nutting	September 21, 2023	N/A
A billionaire arrives in Fort Gator with a new funeral initiative that threatens the family business; he manipulates Trophy into becoming mayor and banning all public grief. Uncle Pete forms a speakeasy bar in the basement so people can privately drown their sorrows in alcohol instead. Meanwhile, Annie and Joey investigate the death of the old mayor, furthering their relationship in the process.
17	10	"A Very Fantasy Vacation"	Scott Adsit	Alissa Nutting	September 28, 2023	N/A
With their home undergoing extermination treatments, the family takes a road trip north of the Florida border to visit their cousins with Trophy only tagging along to avoid being turned in due to debt from multiple eyebrow consultants as they get chased by bounty hunter robots. Amidst the chaos, Baba relapses into her old gambling addiction, Trophy makes further attempts to get her eyebrows done right, and Uncle Pete becomes separated from the others after Trophy used her death powers to separate Florida from the United States to defeat the robot. Trophy is apprehended by the actual bounty hunters with Baba also getting apprehended because she put her payment in her pet goat's name. Both of them end up in debtor prison for awhile, Pete meets up with his cousins in Canada who are cyborg counterparts of himself and Baba as they work on getting him a visa that will enable him to return to Florida, and Annie handles the funeral home until everybody returns.

== Production ==
The series was animated by Augenblick Studios in Brooklyn for its first season, and Atomic Cartoons in Vancouver for its second season.
