= Augenblick Studios =

Independent animation studio

- Type: Private
- Industry: Animation, motion pictures, television
- Founded: September 1999; 26 years ago
- Founders: Aaron Augenblick
- Headquarters: Brooklyn, New York City, United States
- Key people: Aaron Augenblick
- Divisions: Future Brain Media
- Website: www.augenblickstudios.com

Augenblick Studios is an American animation studio founded in 1999 by Aaron Augenblick, and located in Brooklyn, New York City. The company has created a wide array of animated shorts for television, film, and the Internet, with the target audience typically being adults. Their clients include Cartoon Network, Comedy Central, Adult Swim, the TED conference, PBS, MTV, and Nickelodeon. Their logo features a moonshine bottle with wings.

== History ==
Aaron Augenblick studied animation at the School of Visual Arts in New York City. After graduating in 1997, Augenblick worked at MTV Animation on shows such as Daria, Downtown, and Cartoon Sushi.

In 1999, Augenblick opened Augenblick Studios in the Dumbo section of Brooklyn. The first cartoon produced by the company was "Ramblin' Man", an independent short film based on the Hank Williams song. "Ramblin' Man" was released to critical acclaim and was a 2001 SXSW award winner. Several other independent shorts followed, including "Drunky" (2001) and "Plugs McGinniss" (2003).

The first television production from Augenblick Studios was Shorties Watchin' Shorties on Comedy Central in 2004. The show featured animated interpretations of stand up comedy segments from comedians including Denis Leary, Patton Oswalt, Louis C.K., Dane Cook, and Mitch Hedberg. In 2004, Augenblick Studios produced the animated content for two seasons of PFFR's Wonder Showzen on MTV2. Augenblick created short segments, motion graphics, and illustrations for the show.

In 2006, they created the faux-documentary Golden Age for Comedy Central, which was an official selection of the Sundance Film Festival. In 2007, Augenblick Studios animated the short "Lying Rhino" for the feature film comedy The Ten. In 2008, the studio completed 11 episodes of Superjail! for the Adult Swim programming block on Cartoon Network. They also created several short cartoons for Yo Gabba Gabba on Nickelodeon.

Augenblick Studios created 31 episodes of the Comedy Central series Ugly Americans which aired between 2010 and 2012. In 2011, the studio also created a video for the track "Another Tattoo" on Weird Al Yankovic's album Alpocalypse. In 2013, they worked on a cartoon short for Saturday Night Live, with SNL writer Zach Kanin. In 2015, Augenblick Studios collaborated with Animation Domination High Def on Golan the Insatiable, a primetime half-hour series for Fox. In 2015, Augenblick Studios animated a new TV series written and created by Tyler, the Creator called The Jellies! which premiered in 2017. Augenblick Studios also did additional animation for the Cartoon Network animated series MAD. The Netflix series Losers, released in March 2019, features animated segments created by Augenblick Studios.

In January 2016, Augenblick Studios announced it is producing its first animated feature film, The Adventures of Drunky. The R-rated comedy stars Sam Rockwell, Jeffrey Tambor, Steve Coogan, and Nina Arianda. Its release date was slated to be 2018, but production was stalled due to sexual harassment allegations being leveled against Jeffrey Tambor. On September 24, 2021, it was stated that the film would be completed in 2022, with the announcement of a new release date still pending.

Death Hacks, was released on Snapchat on August 29, 2020. The company produces Teenage Euthanasia which started airing on Adult Swim in September 2021.

In 2021, Future Brain Media was established as a children's animation division with Augenblick and Daniel Powell as co-founders. The company has produced two seasons of City Island on PBS Kids.

== Filmography ==
=== Television ===
| Year | Title | Notes | Client |
|---|---|---|---|
| 2004 | Shorties Watchin' Shorties | | Comedy Central |
| 2005–06 | Wonder Showzen | animated segments | MTV2 |
| 2007 | Sesame Street: Kids' Favorite Country Songs | "Tall Tale" segment | Sesame Workshop |
| 2007–08 | Superjail! | pilot and season 1 only | Adult Swim |
| 2009 | Xavier: Renegade Angel | animated contest entry | Adult Swim |
| 2010–12 | Ugly Americans | season 1 and 5 episodes of season 2 | Comedy Central |
| 2012–13 | Mad | additional animation | Cartoon Network |
| 2012 | Saturday Night Live | animation ("Cool Drones", "Faberge Egg Cop" segments) | NBC |
| 2013–15 | Golan the Insatiable | | Fox |
| 2013–14 | The Heart, She Holler | animated segments | Adult Swim |
| 2013 | T.I. & Tiny: The Holiday Hustle | | VH1 |
| 2017–19 | The Jellies! | | Adult Swim |
| 2019 | Losers | | Netflix |
| 2021 | Headspace Guide to Meditation | animation | Netflix |
| 2021 | Teenage Euthanasia | season 1 only | Adult Swim |
| 2021 | Cake | season 5 (Swan Boy segments) | FXX |
| 2022–24 | City Island | produced by Future Brain Media | PBS Kids |
| 2023 | One Piece | 2nd-key animation; ep 1066 | Toei Animation |
| 2024 | House On The Outlands | animation | YouTube |

=== Feature films ===
Key
| † | Denotes works that have not yet been released |

| Year | Title | Co-production with | Note |
|---|---|---|---|
| 2007 | The Ten | ThinkFilm | animation services for "The Lying Rhino" segment for the story "Thou Shalt Not Bear False Witness" |
| 2016 | Zoolander: Super Model | CBS All Access | animation |
| 2019 | Murder in the Front Row: The San Francisco Bay Area Thrash Metal Story | Bonded By Blood | animation |
| 2020 | Have a Good Trip: Adventures in Psychedelics | Netflix | animation |
| 2022 | Weird: The Al Yankovic Story | Funny or Die | animated sequence |
| TBA | Toad † | Muse Entertainment | in-camera animation |
| TBA | The Adventures of Drunky † | Cartuna | animation and post-production |

=== Short films ===
| Year | Title | Client | Notes |
|---|---|---|---|
| 2000 | Ramblin' Man | | animation |
| 2002 | Moomie's Garage | Nickelodeon | one-shot interstitial |
| 2003 | The Man with the Smallest Penis in Existence and the Electron Microscope Technician Who Loved Him | | animation |
| 2007 | Golden Age | Comedy Central | animation |
| 2013–14 | DC Nation Shorts | Warner Bros. Animation | Metal Men shorts |
| 2013 | Cookie Chemistry | TED-Ed | |
| 2013 | What Is JASH? | Jash | |
| 2013 | Spacemen From Brookstonia | Ottawa Animation Festival | |
| 2017 | ASAP Fables: The Snake With No Manners | Topic | animation |
| 2017–18 | The Nib | Topic | |
| 2018–19 | Monologue | Topic | animation; 3 episodes |
| 2020 | Death Hacks | Snapchat | animation |
| 2020 | NYS COVID PSA | Tribeca Film Institute | animation |

=== Music videos ===
| Year | Title | Artist |
|---|---|---|
| 2011 | "Another Tattoo" | "Weird Al" Yankovic |
| 2013 | "Tiny Anthem" | The M Machine |
| 2014 | "Far Away" | Feed Me & Kill the Noise |
| 2015 | "Rubble Kings Theme" | Run the Jewels |
| 2019 | "Expensify This" | 2 Chainz x Adam Scott |
| 2020 | "Ultraviolent" | Kill the Noise |
| 2023 | "Your Horoscope for Today" | "Weird Al" Yankovic |
| 2024 | "Polkamania!" ("Hello" segment) | "Weird Al" Yankovic |
