= Golden Age (2006 film) =

- Directed by: Aaron Augenblick
- Production company: Augenblick Studios
- Release date: 2006
- Running time: 22 minutes
- Country: United States

Golden Age is an adult animated darkly comedic mockumentary short film which debuted as a web-series on Comedy Central's broadband channel Motherload in 2006.

== Summary ==
Ten segments trace the sordid careers of oddball cartoon characters from throughout the history of animation. Notable characters include Marching Gumdrop, Lancaster Loon, and Kongobot.

== Production ==
The film is produced by Augenblick Studios and directed by Aaron Augenblick.

== Release and reception ==
Golden Age was an official selection of the 2007 Sundance Film Festival.

== See also ==
- The Golden Age of American animation
- Animation in the United States in the television era
- World War II and American animation
