= The Jellies! =

American adult animated sitcom

- Genre: Animated sitcom Surreal comedy Slice of life
- Created by: Tyler Okonma; Lionel Boyce
- Directed by: Aaron Augenblick
- Voices of: Phil LaMarr; Earl Skakel; A.J. Johnson; Blake Anderson; Kevin Michael Richardson; Kilo Kish
- Composer: Tyler, The Creator
- Country of origin: United States
- Original language: English
- No. of seasons: 2
- No. of episodes: 20

Production
- Executive producers: Tyler, The Creator; Lionel Boyce; Kelly Salo Clancy; Aaron Augenblick; Lloyd Braun; Jared Heinke; Laura Sweet; Keith Crofford; Walter Newman
- Running time: 8–12 minutes (web series); 11 minutes (TV series)
- Production companies: The Great Wang of the Floggnaw Land (web series and season 1); Bald Fade Productions; Augenblick Studios; International Donut Fund Productions (web series and season 1); Whalerock Industries (Season 2 only); Williams Street

Original release
- Network: Golf Media (2015); Adult Swim (2017–2019)
- Release: October 22, 2017 – June 23, 2019

The Jellies! is an American adult animated sitcom created by Tyler, the Creator and Lionel Boyce for Cartoon Network's late-night programming block Adult Swim. The show was revamped from a web series of the same name which was previously featured exclusively on Tyler's Golf Media app. It premiered on Adult Swim on October 22, 2017. The animation is produced by Augenblick Studios, and was renewed for a second season in October 2018. The second season premiered on May 12, 2019.

On August 17, 2021, voice actor Earl Skakel announced that Adult Swim cancelled the show after two seasons.

== Plot ==
The show follows a family of anthropomorphic jellyfish: Barry, the father, Debbie, the mother, KY, the daughter, and their 16-year-old human son Cornell. When Cornell learns he was adopted at birth, he is shocked, and subsequently spirals out of control in an attempt to find out the truth about who he really is. As a result, he and his family and friends wind up in what the network bills as "uncanny situations."

== Cast ==
- Brock Baker (web series), Phil LaMarr as Cornell Jelly
- Earl Skakel as Barry Jelly
- AJ Johnson as Debbie Jelly
- Blake Anderson as RG
- Kevin Michael Richardson as Reggie
- Kilo Kish as KY Jelly
- Tyler, The Creator as various
- Jasper Dolphin as various
- Lionel Boyce as various
- Travis Bennett as various

== Episodes ==
=== Series overview ===
Season	Episodes	Originally released	
Season	Episodes	First released	Last released
Web series	7	October 2015	
1	10	October 22, 2017	December 17, 2017
2	10	May 20, 2019	June 23, 2019

=== Web series (2015) ===
The series premiered as a web series on the Golf Media app and released new episodes every Sunday in October 2015. There are a few differences between the web series and the Adult Swim series such as Cornell's race (Caucasian in the Golf Media version; African-American in the Adult Swim version).

No.	Title	Directed by	Written by
1	"Pilot"	Aaron Augenblick	Tyler Okonma & Lionel Boyce
After finding out he's adopted, Cornell goes to great lengths to find the meaning of his life.
2	"Panda"	Aaron Augenblick	Tyler Okonma & Lionel Boyce
When Barry and Cornell adopt a Chinese kid, he tells them of a terrible secret going on at a local Chinese restaurant.
3	"Nigeria"	Aaron Augenblick	Tyler Okonma & Lionel Boyce
Cornell gets kidnapped by Nigerian infidels and is held hostage.
4	"Nascar"	Aaron Augenblick	Tyler Okonma & Lionel Boyce
Cornell becomes a NASCAR racer.
5	"MTV"	Aaron Augenblick	Tyler Okonma & Lionel Boyce
When Ray doesn't have a date to the dance, Cornell goes under a temporary sex change to be his date.
6	"Daft Punk"	Aaron Augenblick	Tyler Okonma & Lionel Boyce
Samuel-Desean tells Cornell the truth about the band Daft Punk.
7	"AIDS"	Aaron Augenblick	Tyler Okonma & Lionel Boyce
When Cornell tries to be exactly like Eazy E to impress a girl, he ends up getting AIDs.

=== Season 1 (2017) ===
No.	Title	Directed by	Written by	Original release date	U.S. viewers (millions)
1	"Gangsta's Paradise"	Aaron Augenblick	Tyler Okonma & Lionel Boyce	October 22, 2017	0.74
When Debbie and Barry struggle with their marriage, Cornell tries to step in and save it by taking them to a concert. Guest star: Wanya Morris
2	"Ray's Perfect Date"	Aaron Augenblick	Tyler Okonma & Lionel Boyce	October 29, 2017	0.74
Ray can't seem to get a date for the prom, so Cornell goes to enormous lengths to help his friend out, including a surgical procedure to turn himself into a woman.
3	"Pilot"	Aaron Augenblick	Tyler Okonma & Lionel Boyce	November 5, 2017	0.74
Cornell receives shocking news that sends him and his best friend, Reggie, on a wild chase. Guest star: ASAP Nast
4	"Mervin for Mayor"	Aaron Augenblick	Tyler Okonma & Lionel Boyce	November 12, 2017	0.69
Mervin Collins runs for the town mayor position against the incumbent Leonard Jenkins. Note: this is the first episode of the show to be rated TV-MA.
5	"The Gameshow"	Aaron Augenblick	Tyler Okonma & Lionel Boyce	November 19, 2017	0.94
To deal with some womanly changes her body is going through, KY goes on a sketchy dating show.
6	"Barry's School Reunion"	Aaron Augenblick	Tyler Okonma & Lionel Boyce	November 26, 2017	0.73
In a mid-life YOLO moment, Barry reluctantly attends his high school reunion. Guest star: ASAP Nast
7	"Cornell Gets a Dog"	Aaron Augenblick	Tyler Okonma & Lionel Boyce	December 3, 2017	0.74
A mysterious dog with secret motives that spell trouble captures Cornell’s fragile heart. Guest star: Angela Nissel
8	"Trial of the Century"	Aaron Augenblick	Tyler Okonma & Lionel Boyce	December 10, 2017	0.68
Cornell and Reggie watch two hip hop artists face off in a court case in civil court.
9	"The Invasion"	Aaron Augenblick	Tyler Okonma & Lionel Boyce	December 17, 2017	0.71
10	"The Invasion"	Aaron Augenblick	Tyler Okonma & Lionel Boyce	December 17, 2017	0.71
Cornell learns more information about his real parents, but things go south when praying mantises declare war on earth. Meanwhile, Cornell’s friend group hangs out with a kid who’s famous for his Dirtbike. Guest stars: ASAP Nast and Angela Nissel Note: This episode’s official description is intentionally vague. The description for both parts says “just watch this episode. Trust me.”

=== Season 2 (2019) ===
No.	Title	Directed by	Written by	Original release date	U.S. viewers (millions)
11	"My Brother's Keeper"	Aaron Augenblick	Carl Jones	May 20, 2019	0.65
Barry's brother comes to town and has a negative influence on Cornell, leaving Barry concerned about his son’s safety. Guest star: Slink Johnson
12	"Jellystripper"	Aaron Augenblick	Hugh Moore	May 20, 2019	0.59
KY finds her true calling as a stripper, but she doesn’t expect Barry to shut down her dream. Guest stars: Travis "Taco" Bennett, Frankie Ingrassia, and Angela Nissel
13	"These Nuts"	Aaron Augenblick	Brian Ash	May 27, 2019	0.55
Trouble looms as the city of Walla Walla is gentrified by peanuts, including Barry’s new supervisor, which is a literal living, breathing peanut.
14	"Crash for Cash"	Aaron Augenblick	Carl Jones	May 27, 2019	0.50
Debbie meets a sleazy TV lawyer, but accidentally gets swept up in the world of TV law when she is a suspect at a crime scene. Guest stars: Frankie Ingrassia and Cedric Yarbrough
15	"The Last Reggie on Earth"	Aaron Augenblick	Brian Inthavong	June 3, 2019	0.58
After forgetting about the Annual Walla Walla Talent Show, Reggie panics, assuming that he's the last man left on earth, and tries to find someone else in the town.
16	"The Storm"	Aaron Augenblick	Carl Jones	June 10, 2019	0.62
A Tornado forces various characters to take shelter at the family’s house while they're trying to watch TV, and none of them are happy about it. Guest stars: GoldLink and Slink Johnson
17	"Doctor Pirates"	Aaron Augenblick	Jaydi Samuels	June 10, 2019	0.57
Debbie's family reunion is crashed by unsuspecting guests: Doctors who are Pirates in disguise. Guest stars: Affion Crockett, Debra Wilson, and J.D. Witherspoon
18	"Walla Walla Civil War"	Aaron Augenblick	Jaydi Samuels	June 17, 2019	0.57
A small dispute over Sweaters and Turtle Necks leads to a lengthy Civil War in Walla Walla.
19	"Walla Walla Wallabees B"	Aaron Augenblick	Carl Jones	June 24, 2019**	0.67
A Music artist brings his group to Cornell's high school, making it under siege by the Band members. Guest stars: Travis "Taco" Bennett, Affion Crockett, and Slink Johnson Note: This episode originally parodied the Wu-Tang Clan and was set to air on June 2, 2019, but was pulled before airing, being re-animated and re-dubbed to replace the Wu-Tang likeness with the fictional band New York. The original Wu-Tang Clan version of the episode ended up airing on June 28, 2019, although it's unknown if this was an accident or not. The original aired again on July 22, 2019 during the early hours, but on the re-air at 4 AM the censored episode aired.
20	"My Friend Sheldon Jr."	Aaron Augenblick	Jaydi Samuels	June 24, 2019	0.58
There's something strange about one of Cornell's friends, and the truth comes out during a surprising conversation. Guest star: Debra Wilson
