= Ali Stroker =

American actress and singer (born 1987)

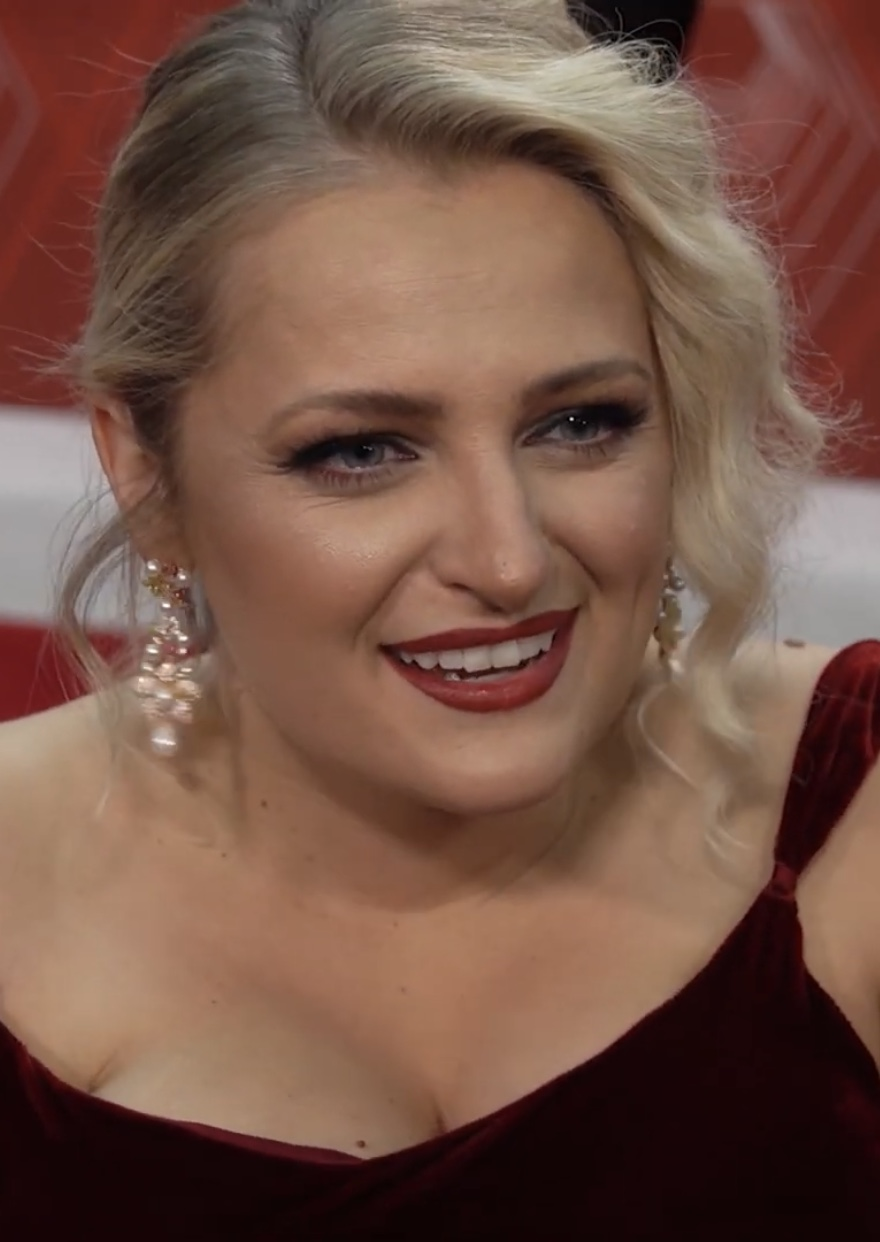
- Stroker at the 74th Tony Awards in 2021
- Born: Alyson Mackenzie Stroker; June 16, 1987 (age 39); Ridgewood, New Jersey, U.S.
- Education: New York University (BFA)
- Occupations: Actress; singer
- Years active: 2011–present
- Spouse: David Perlow
- Children: 1
- Website: alistroker.com

Alyson Mackenzie Stroker (born June 16, 1987) is an American actress, author and singer. She is the first actor who uses a wheelchair to appear on a Broadway stage, and also the first to be nominated for and win a Tony Award. Stroker was a finalist on the second season of The Glee Project in 2012 and later appeared as a guest star on Glee in 2013. She played Anna in Deaf West Theatre's 2015 revival of Spring Awakening and won the 2019 Tony Award for Best Featured Actress in a Musical for her performance in Oklahoma!.

== Early life ==
Ali Stroker grew up in New Jersey with her parents, Jody Schleicher and Jim Stroker, as well as an older brother, Jake. At the age of two, Stroker and her brother were in a car accident that resulted in a spinal cord injury that left Ali paralyzed from the waist down. Unable to walk, she uses a wheelchair. She attended Ridgewood High School, where she was senior class president and starred in school musicals.

Stroker trained with the Summer Musical Theater Conservatory program at the Paper Mill Playhouse in Millburn, New Jersey.

In 2007, Ali performed alongside Alex Brightman in "Mrs. Sharp" by Ryan Scott Oliver & Kirsten Guenther under the direction of Ryan Mekenian and musical direction of Alex Lacamoire. In 2009, Stroker became the first actor who uses a wheelchair to earn a degree from the New York University Tisch School of the Arts, with a degree in Fine Arts.

== Career ==
Stroker has given solo performances at the Kennedy Center in Washington, D.C., and New York's Town Hall in addition to concert performances at Lincoln Center in New York City.

Stroker starred in the Paper Mill Playhouse's production of The 25th Annual Putnam County Spelling Bee. She later reprised her role in this show at Philadelphia Theatre Company, and that performance earned her a Barrymore Award nomination.

In 2012, she auditioned for The Glee Project and was cast for the 12-episode series. She made it to the final episode and placed second, earning a guest role on Glee, playing Betty Pillsbury, Ms. Pillsbury's niece, in Season 4, Episode 14: "I Do".

In 2014, she had a role in the film Cotton, also known as Everyday Miracles.

In 2014 and 2015, Stroker had a three-episode role playing Wendy in the MTV series Faking It.

In 2015, she made history by becoming the first actor who uses a wheelchair to appear on a Broadway stage. She originated the role of Anna in Deaf West Theatre's 2015 revival of Spring Awakening.

In 2017, Stroker was cast as Tamara in the ABC show Ten Days in the Valley. The series was cancelled after 1 season due to low ratings.

In 2018, she played Ado Annie in St. Ann's Warehouse's critically acclaimed revival of Oklahoma! The production transferred to Broadway's Circle in the Square Theatre in 2019, earning Stroker a Tony Award for Best Featured Actress in a Musical, making her the first person with a disability to be nominated for and to receive that award.

In 2020, she was in Lifetime's Christmas Ever After, airing on December 6, 2020.

In 2021, she played Detective Allison Mulaney on the police procedural television series Blue Bloods, and played Paulette on the mystery-comedy television series Only Murders in the Building.

In 2024, she sang the American national anthem during the 2024 Summer Paralympics closing ceremony in Paris.

== Advocacy ==
Stroker co-chaired an awards luncheon in 2016 for Women Who Care, which supports United Cerebral Palsy of New York City. She is a founding member of Be More Heroic, an anti-bullying campaign which tours the country connecting with thousands of students each year. She has gone to South Africa with ARTS InsideOut where she has held theater classes and workshops for women and children affected by AIDS.

== Personal life ==
Stroker is bisexual and dated fellow The Glee Project contestant Dani Shay from 2012 to 2015.

Stroker attended the 2019 Tony Awards with theater director and actor David Perlow. She and Perlow reconnected in 2015 after meeting in college and are founding directors of ATTENTIONTheatre. They married in July 2021 and had a child together in late 2022.

== Credits ==
=== Film ===
Year	Title	Role	Notes
2011	I Was a Mermaid and Now I'm a Pop Star	Party Girl	Video short
2014	Cotton	Jeanie	
2026	Office Romance		Post-production

=== Television ===
Year	Title	Role	Notes
2012	The Glee Project	Herself	12 episodes
2013	Glee	Betty Pillsbury	Episode: "I Do"
2014–2015	Faking It	Wendy	3 episodes
2017	Ten Days in the Valley	Tamara	3 episodes
2018	Lethal Weapon	Nina	Episode: "Funny Money"
2018	Drunk History	Judith Heumann	Episode: "Civil Rights"
2018	Instinct	Ella	Episode: "Secrets and Lies"
2019	Charmed	First Auditionee	Episode: "Witch Perfect"
2020	BoJack Horseman	(voice)	Episode: "Angela"
2020	Helpsters	Basketball Brianna	Episode: "Basketball Brianna/Heart's Fish"
2020	The Bold Type	Olivia	Episode: "Leveling Up"
2020	Christmas Ever After	Izzi Simmons	Television film
2021	Blue Bloods	Det. Allison Mulaney	Episode: "Redemption"
2021–2022	Only Murders in the Building	Paulette	4 episodes
2021–2023	And Just Like That...	Chloe	2 episodes
2022	Ozark	Charles-Ann	7 episodes
2022	Echoes	Claudia	7 episodes
2022	Blue's Big City Adventure	Herself	Television film
2022	Gossip Girl	Guest Singer	Episode: "How to Bury a Millionaire"
2022–2023	Big City Greens	Sunday (voice)	2 episodes
2022–2023	Big Nate	Amy / Random Girl (voice)	6 episodes
2022–2024	Alice's Wonderland Bakery	Daisy (voice)	4 episodes
2023	Firebuds	Gliderbella (voice)	Episode: "All That Jazzy/Iguana Hold Your Hand"
2023	Great Performances	Lady Anne Neville	Episode: "Richard III"
2024	City Island	Lacey/Rita/Leslie (voice)	Episode: "Dancing Rules"
2024	The Bravest Knight	Rya (voice)	Episode: "Cedric & the Thief"

=== Theatre ===
Year	Title	Role	Location	Notes
2011	The 25th Annual Putnam County Spelling Bee	Olive Ostrovsky	Paper Mill Playhouse	Regional Theatre
2015	Spring Awakening	Anna	Wallis Annenberg Center	Regional Theatre – Deaf West Theatre
2015–2016	Spring Awakening	Anna	Brooks Atkinson Theatre	Broadway – Deaf West Theatre Transfer
2018	The 25th Annual Putnam County Spelling Bee	Olive Ostrovsky	Cleveland Play House	Regional Theatre
2018	Annie	Star-to-Be	Hollywood Bowl	Regional Theatre
2018	Oklahoma!	Ado Annie Carnes	St. Ann's Warehouse	Off-Broadway
2019–2020	Oklahoma!	Ado Annie Carnes	Circle in the Square Theatre	Broadway
2022	Richard III	Lady Anne Neville	Delacorte Theatre	Off-Broadway
2024	Babbitt	Storyteller #4	Shakespeare Theatre Company	Regional Theatre
2026	The 25th Annual Putnam County Spelling Bee	Rona Lisa Peretti	New World Stages	Off-Broadway

== Awards and nominations ==
Year	Award	Category	Work	Result	Ref.
2016	Astaire Award	Outstanding Ensemble in a Broadway Show	Spring Awakening	Nominated	
2019	Tony Award	Best Featured Actress in a Musical	Oklahoma!	Won	
2019	Drama Desk Award	Outstanding Featured Actress in a Musical	Oklahoma!	Won	
2019	Drama League Award	Distinguished Performance	Oklahoma!	Nominated	
2019	Outer Critics Circle Award	Outstanding Featured Actress in a Musical	Oklahoma!	Nominated	
2020	Grammy Awards	Best Musical Theater Album	Oklahoma!	Nominated	
