= Gemma Correll =

English cartoonist and illustrator

- Self portrait, with pug (2013)
- Born: 3 February 1984 (age 42); Ipswich, Suffolk, England
- Occupations: Illustrator, author
- Years active: 1989–present

Gemma Correll (born 3 February 1984) is a British cartoonist and illustrator who is known for her comics depicting personal, relatable anxieties and pugs.

== Early life and education ==
Correll was born in Ipswich and attended the Norwich School of Art and Design, graduating in 2006 with a BA (hons) in Graphic Design, specializing in Illustration.

== Career ==
"Drawing helps to clear my head, to reflect on and clarify my thoughts, feelings and ideas. [...] I love being able to articulate my thoughts in ways that I struggle to verbally. I create the comics I wish I could have read growing up."

— Gemma Correll, 2021 editorial for The Lily

Correll recounts that she "felt somehow compelled" to start drawing "little stories" at 5 years old, both as a distraction from her anxieties and as a way to connect with her fellow schoolmates. She sold The Chatterbox, a self-published comic, to other students and teachers for a nominal sum to earn pocket money for snacks and soda. She entered university intending to study English Literature and Education, but switched to Graphic Design before long. While attending art school, her professor urged her to pursue the work he saw in her sketchbook. During her final year, she was able to sell self-designed merchandise. Although she worked part-time jobs after graduating, she continued to doodle in her spare time. Her first paid commission was designing a brochure of vacation packages for Virgin Holidays.

In 2009, after selling her own products at craft fairs and online via Etsy.com, Correll became a full-time illustrator and joined the Anna Goodson Illustration Agency, which helped her gain exposure to numerous clients that include Hallmark Cards, The New York Times, and Oxford University Press.

Correll illustrated the Pugly series of children's books from author Pamela Butchart. She has contributed regularly to The Nib since 2014.

In 2012, she was featured in a month-long solo exhibition at the Land gallery in Portland, Oregon. Her work was featured in 2021 as part of the Emerging Artist Showcase at the Cartoon Art Museum in San Francisco.

Correll cites Lynda Barry as her biggest inspiration and adds she has been influenced by the works of Kate Beaton, Jeffrey Brown, Terry Deary, Julie Doucet, Tom Gauld, Carl Giles, Matt Groening, Gary Larson, Simone Lia, Ronald Searle, and Posy Simmonds.

=== Selected bibliography ===
- — (2022). It's a Pug's Life. Dog n Bone. ISBN 9781912983506.
- — (2015). The Worrier's Guide to Life. Kansas City: Andrews McMeel. ISBN 9781449466008.
- — (2014). It's a Punderful Life. Dog n Bone. ISBN 9781909313286.
- — (2013). A Pug's Guide to Etiquette. Dog n Bone. ISBN 9781909313033.
- — (2013). A Dog's Life. Te Neues. ISBN 978-3-8327-9742-3.
- — (2012). A Cat's Life. Te Neues. ISBN 978-3-8327-9666-2.

== Personal life ==
Correll resides in Orange County, California with her husband, the collage artist Anthony Zinonos, and their trio of rescued pugs, Mr. Pickles, Bean, and Zander. (Note: Zander is technically half-Chihuahua.)
