= Aaron Augenblick =

American animator, director and producer

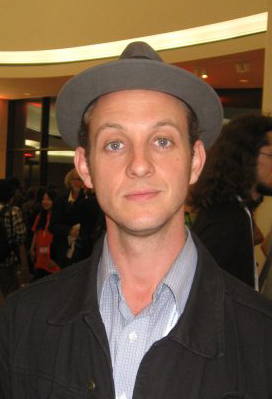
- Augenblick at the Ottawa International Animation Festival in 2011.
- Education: School of Visual Arts (BFA)
- Occupations: Animator, director, and producer
- Awards: ASIFA Awards

Aaron Augenblick is an American animator, director, writer, and producer. He is the founder of Augenblick Studios, creator of City Island, and known for his work on Ugly Americans, Superjail!, Wonder Showzen, and Golden Age.

== Early life and education ==
Augenblick grew up in Wilmington, Delaware, and studied at the School of Visual Arts (SVA) in New York City. While at college, Augenblick created two animated short films entitled "The Midnight Carnival" (screened at Slamdance Festival 2000) and "The Wire". These films received two ASIFA Awards and the SVA Dusty Award for outstanding achievement in Animation. On October 20, 1996, "The Wire" was screened on the Cartoon Network as part of the ToonHeads special: A Night of Independent Animation.

== Career ==
He began his professional career working at MTV Animation on such television shows as Daria, Cartoon Sushi and Downtown. In 1999, Augenblick founded Augenblick Studios, an animation production facility located in Brooklyn, NY. In addition to animation, Augenblick has written and illustrated the Xeric Award-winning "Tales of the Great Unspoken".

From 2004 to 2005, Augenblick was the animation director for two seasons of Wonder Showzen, a cult favorite for MTV. Augenblick Studios garnered widespread notoriety for their spot-on parodies of classic cartoons, leading to Augenblick being named as one of the rising stars of animation by Animation Magazine.

In 2006, Augenblick wrote and directed Golden Age, a faux-documentary which examined the scandalous private lives of iconic cartoon characters from the past. The ten episodes series was originally created for Comedy Central's broadband channel Motherload and was later released as a 22-minute short film. Golden Age was an official selection of the Sundance Film Festival and played in numerous festivals worldwide.

Augenblick Studios created the first season of Superjail! in 2008, an animated series for Adult Swim on the Cartoon Network. Augenblick was the show's executive producer and animation director.

From 2010 to 2012, Augenblick served as the supervising producer and animation director for Comedy Central's horror-comedy series Ugly Americans. The 2011 Ottawa International Animation Festival screened a retrospective of Augenblick's work. In 2015, he directed the animated shows Golan the Insatiable for Fox and "The Jellies" for Golf Wang. Augenblick served as an executive producer and director for Adult Swim's adaptation of The Jellies! in 2017.

In 2019, Aaron co-founded the children's entertainment focused company, Future Brain Media. Their first project was City Island on PBS Kids. The series was created by Augenblick, with art direction by Gemma Correll. The comedy series takes place in an anthropomophic city, and features special guest stars Julio Torres, Amy Schumer, Rachel Bloom, Rosie Perez, Ellen Cleghorne, Michael-Leon Wooley, Ali Stroker, and Debi Mazar. To date, the company has produced 40 episodes of the series, 10 music videos, 2 video games, and a merchandise line. In 2024, City Island received the Webby Awards for Best Kid's and Family Video and the People's Choice.
