= Richard Ferguson-Hull =

American animation director

Richard Ferguson-Hull (also credited as Rich Ferguson-Hull) is an American animation director, working primarily in the formats of television serials and advertising. He is best known as the long-time director of Cartoon Network's popular Harvey Birdman, Attorney At Law.

In 2005, the Harvey Birdman Episode Birdgirl of Guatanamole won Best Animated Series For Adults at the Ottawa International Animation Festival. In 2001, he directed Uncle Gus, a pilot for Cartoon Network, based on the comic strip by Lincoln Pierce.
