= Ugly Americans (TV series) =

American animated series

- Genre: Sitcom; Black comedy; Bizarro fiction; Adult animation
- Created by: Devin Clark
- Developed by: David M. Stern
- Written by: Aaron Blitzstein; Mick Kelly; Greg White; David M. Stern; Jeff Poliquin; Kevin Shinick; Daniel Powell; Bill Krebs; Erik Richter; Mike Rowe; Adam Stein; Jordan Pomaville
- Directed by: Devin Clark; Aaron Augenblick; Lucy Snyder; Richard Ferguson-Hull
- Voices of: Matt Oberg; Kurt Metzger; Natasha Leggero; Randy Pearlstein; Michael-Leon Wooley; Larry Murphy
- Composers: Bradford Reed; Andrew Landry; Chris Anderson (S1)
- Countries of origin: United States; Canada
- Original language: English
- No. of seasons: 2
- No. of episodes: 31 (list of episodes)

Production
- Executive producers: David M. Stern; Daniel Powell; Adam Shaheen (Note: for Cuppa Coffee Studios; Season 1 only); Devin Clark (Note: executive producer; Season 2, episodes 9-17); Kathy Gray (Note: for Turner Studios Animation; Season 2, episodes 2-5, 10 and 15); Jeff Poliquin (Note: Season 2, episodes 9-17); Erik Richer (Note: Season 2, episodes 9-17)
- Producers: Devin Clark (S01); Colin A.B.V Lewis; Craig Digregorio (S01EP01-06); Martin Markle
- Running time: 22 minutes
- Production companies: Comedy Partners; Tookie Wilson Productions (Note: Season 1 to season 2, episodes 8 and 15); Augenblick Studios (Note: Season 1 to season 2, episodes 1 and 10-17); Cuppa Coffee Studios (Note: Season 1); F**k Factor Productions (Note: Season 1, episode 12); Irony Point (Note: Season 2, episodes 9-17); Turner Studios (Note: Season 2, episodes 2-9 and 15); Big Jump (Note: Season 2, episodes 1-13 and 15); Solis Animation/Markle Productions (Note: Season 2, episodes 14-17)

Original release
- Network: Comedy Central
- Release: March 17, 2010 – April 25, 2012

Ugly Americans is an adult animated sitcom created by Devin Clark and developed by David M. Stern. It was aired from March 17, 2010 to April 25, 2012. The series focuses on the life of Mark Lilly, a social worker employed by the Department of Integration, in an alternate reality version of New York City inhabited by monsters and other creatures. Daniel Powell served as executive producer and Aaron Augenblick as supervising producer and animation director.

Ugly Americans aired on Comedy Central from March 17, 2010, to April 25, 2012, with a total of 31 episodes over two seasons.

== Production ==
Pre-production was handled at Brooklyn-based Augenblick Studios, and then the animation for the first season was produced in Flash and handled at Cuppa Coffee Studios in Toronto. The first half of the second season was handled by Big Jump Entertainment in Ottawa. The animation for the second half of season two was handled by Markle Productions and Solis Animation that are also located in Toronto.

The series premiered on March 17, 2010, on Comedy Central. The series is based on a webseries by Devin Clark entitled 5 On with Alan Whiter, which was later developed by former The Simpsons writer David M. Stern. It was picked for seven episodes in May 2009 and renewed for an additional seven episodes to air in October 2010. The show's second season premiered on June 30, 2011.

On May 29, 2013, the show's producers announced the series' cancellation via the show's Facebook page, saying: "the network did everything in their power to keep the show alive by trying to find outside financing. We came very close but unfortunately some legal technicalities kept any deals from going through." The possibility of the show continuing via other mediums, such as web shorts or graphic novels, was not ruled out.

On September 3, 2014, the series was revived as a mobile app game for iOS.

== Plot ==
An upbeat, mild-mannered man named Mark Lilly moves to Manhattan, which is inhabited by humans and a wide variety of non-human and demonic species. He becomes a social worker with the Social Services Division of the Department of Integration, a sub-set of the U.S. Department of Homeland Security, which specializes in facilitating the integration of the non-humans into the city.

Mark lives with a lazy, over-sexed zombie roommate and has a wizard co-worker and a demon boss. His succubus girlfriend, who also works at the Department of Integration, is the daughter of Satan (who is trying to bring about the end of days) and a human who "looks like Mia Farrow in Rosemary's Baby".

Mark struggles to stay cheerful and politically correct while working with his bizarre and frequently dangerous companions.

== Characters ==
=== Main characters ===
- Mark Lilly (voiced by Matt Oberg) – A 21-year-old man who works at the Department of Integration's Social Services Division and a newcomer to Manhattan. While attending college, Mark was a brother of the Zeta Psi fraternity. In the pilot, he had recently moved into his first apartment, a two-bedroom he found on Craigslist. Despite the frustrations of his job where his boss Twayne Boneraper downsized Social Services to two people in the pilot in order to shift funding to Law Enforcement, Mark maintains a positive attitude. Mark very often tries to help the various immigrant monsters and aliens and be 100% accepting of their often strange and dangerous customs in the name of tolerance, only to end up angering both humans and monsters and get hurt or taken advantage of as a result. In the department, he seems to be the only one who actually cares about their job, at all.
- Randall Skeffington (voiced by Kurt Metzger) – Mark's roommate, who became a zombie in an attempt to win over a cute girl with a zombie fixation, only to find out she had moved on to warlocks. Now, the unemployed and undead Randall spends his days doing odd jobs to pay the rent (including making amateur, hidden-camera pornographic movies of Mark and Callie having sex). He often uses a catch phrase of sorts by groaning the word "crap" in a way stereotypical of a zombie moan for brains. Randall hails from South Jersey, a fiercely anti-zombie community, so he has been forced to hide his condition from his parents (especially his father, who fought in the Human-Zombie Civil War). Due to his zombie nature, Randall is frequently losing body parts to decay, forcing him to find replacements at local flea markets. Like other zombies, Randall finds the smell and taste of human flesh appealing. In "Treegasm", Randall's penis was shown to be a living creature in its own right. He has admitted that he has been living his sexual life so long that he is indiscriminate in choosing sexual partners, in one instance a toaster. He sometimes gets cravings for flesh, causing him to go temporarily insane with desire, and is in a program similar to Alcoholics Anonymous to deal with his cravings (mentioned in "An American Werewolf in America"). He has rarely missed an opportunity to consume Mark's body parts when it appeared he had been killed or otherwise didn't need them. In "Blob Gets Job", he mentions to Mark that he only has two working taste buds. He also has a bad habit of using Mark's things without permission.
- Callie Maggotbone (voiced by Natasha Leggero) – A succubus who is Mark's immediate superior, and his on-again/off-again girlfriend. In between romantic interludes with Mark, she berates him for being so caring and sensitive, although she loves it when he talks about how violent and malicious she is. She is the half human/half succubus daughter of the Devil and a human mother who was drugged by a cult and forced to bear his child, although this was retconned in the episode "Callie and her Sister" as a marriage of convenience: Her father got out of an arranged marriage to Twayne's mother and her mother got to have the child she always wanted. Callie is frequently marginalized with her demon side, and displays drastic mood swings and physio gnomic morphing between her demonic and more human appearances. Although she is drawn to Mark because he is nice, she feels in her heart that she will inevitably end up with someone like Twayne Boneraper, despite being repulsed by the idea, although she seems indifferent to the fact that such a union would bring about the end of humanity. She dislikes her father, seeming to be more turned on by Mark after believing her father hated him but has shown to deeply care about her mother, going to her to seek advice. Being a female demon, her body goes through a process called Painful Mortal Shedding, in which the toxins in her body cause her to shed her skin for a new one, during which she becomes increasingly deranged where the only thing that can numb the pain is sex. In earlier episodes she is shown to be overly possessive of Mark, and can shape shift. Unlike all pure demons, Callie has a soul, though she can remove it at will, although doing this seems to make her a full demon since when she does remove it, she changes into a large demonic beast. According to Mark's calendar, her period is three weeks long. Due to her demon side, she gets aroused by the sight of physical injury. At the end of the second season she asked Mark to be "engaged to be engaged" to her.
- Leonard Powers (voiced by Randy Pearlstein) – A wizard whose path has led him to a desk job at New York's Department of Integration. This suits Leonard just fine, as his primary goals in life are to drink heavily and not rock the boat. He hasn't done any real work in over three years, usually just literally throwing his case files out of a window, relying on Mark and his union, The Wizard's Guild, to cover for him. Leonard bears much resentment to his older but younger-looking brother, the famous magician Christ Angel (a parody of Criss Angel), due to Christ's abuse of Leonard during their childhood. Leonard has a soft spot for Mark, although this may be because Mark covers for him so much. Despite this he appears to have a vast array of knowledge when it comes to the different types of beings that live in New York, as he often explains the importance of something Mark finds pointless or odd, and seems fairly competent at spell-casting, when he bothers to actually focus on it. In one day he became a tuna canner in Alaska, addicted to spray paint, and gained a lot of weight, and was worshiped as a god in Dà Nang, Vietnam, claiming he really needed structure to function properly. In the episode "Kong of Queens", Leonard mentions to Mark that he currently lives at the YMCA, though in "Kill, Mark... Kill!", it is shown that he lives in an apartment in a townhouse.
- Twayne Boneraper (voiced by Michael-Leon Wooley) – A demonic, mid-level government bureaucrat who is the Director of New York's Department of Integration. Twayne loathes Mark's case files and would rather vaporize them than help them, but cannot, because infiltrating the U.S. government appears to be part of some larger demonic plan. Nonetheless, he despises Social Services and their compassionate ways, so in the pilot, he slashes the department down to just Leonard and Mark, the only two he could not get rid of, Leonard due to his union and Mark due to filling the token "Bleeding Heart" position, in order to allocate most of its funds to law enforcement. Despite his imposing appearance, Twayne often relies on Callie to make sure the department runs properly. Mark has referred to him as a "total douche nozzle". He also suffers from a severe case of glossophobia and shows signs of being a Momma's Boy, as seen in "Hell for the Holidays". Whenever he is under great stress he thinks of ponies, often repeating the word "ponies" aloud to make himself happy. He is also treated with little respect from the other demons, as they often look annoyed when he joins them. Twayne comes from a very well known and prestigious family and is very rich, although he doesn't seem to know how much he has, as when asked how he could afford to write Leonard a check for 1 billion dollars, he asked "How much is 12 zeroes?". Like most demons, he bleeds white snakes. Twayne's birthday is March 8, 1941, making him aged 70 as of 2011. He is often shown to be a child at heart, like when he and a little girl went to a fair and became BFF's.
- Francis Grimes (voiced by Larry Murphy) – The head of Department of Integration's Law Enforcement Division, and like Twayne, has utter disdain for non-humans. Preferring to think of them all as "illegal", he hunts down those who have strayed from the proper bureaucratic procedures that provide a path to U.S. Citizenship – at which point Mark must step in to help. As young man, he was an officer of the New York Police Department, but was fired because he kept ruining his partner's sting operations. Grimes' encounters with unruly creatures have left him with a lifetime's worth of both physical scars, such as his missing kneecap, and emotional ones, as that stemming from his broken marriage. Thus, he naturally detests Mark and anyone else who sympathizes with the immigrants. Grimes commands a small but well-funded goon squad that operates out of the D.O.I.'s "force floor". He has a daughter who in the first season, became a vampire and got married. His relationship with his wife is complex, given that after 15 births (all daughters) Grimes's wife left him and married "The Count." He likes to collect model trains and also moonlights as a hospital security guard and contract hit-man. He is also shown to be attracted to older women in "Better Off Undead". In the second season finale "Mummy Dearest," it is revealed that his mother is a Mummy and that he is Egyptian. Grimes has powers of some sort as he is able to perform a ritual to summon Anubis to get rid of his mother.

=== Recurring characters ===
- Great Brain (voiced by Randy Pearlstein) – A living brain from Canada. He works as a counter-top sponge, and is usually the first to voice his opinion. He and his wife have a complicated relationship and enjoy playing mind games on others, which is aided by their telepathic powers.
- Croatian Man (voiced by Devin Clark) – A man from Croatia. Works in a hospital as a candy striper, but dreams of becoming the President of the United States. Mark once described him as a sociopath. It is revealed in "Any Given Workday" that his real name is "Goran", though he only lets his friends call him that.
- Doug – A very timid humanoid koala man usually mistreated by others, or in the wrong place at the wrong time. He almost always is seen weeping, whether frightened, overjoyed, or otherwise emotional. It is indicated in "The ManBirds" that Doug has a tendency to wander off. A still drawing in the end credits of the episode "Kong of Queen" portray him firing a rifle in a 1930s zoot suit and hat. The scene resembles Saddam Hussein firing his rifle into the air during a military parade in December 2001. Turns out that photo was actually foreshadowing that "Doug" is none other than a dangerous former assassin, who abandoned his work after he was responsible for a massacre in Bolivia, in which many women and children perished. Consumed by guilt, Doug moved to the U.S. under a new alias and tried starting his life anew. He still feels very guilty about the aforementioned incident and it is hinted his gentle and timid nature is a direct result of the past trauma. However, he still retains most of his assassin skills (especially when provoked). His dream is to fly.
- Erik (voiced by Randy Pearlstein) – A robot with senses and emotions, though more often than not has a cynical viewpoint. He is able to read punch cards, but is annoyed that everyone assumes he can. His dream is to be a human boy. It is possible that he is a former human who was murdered and became a robot to survive as stated during the last episode but it is unknown if this is true as this was all part of an elaborate practical joke on Mark.
- Martin – A two-headed worm who works in a coffee shop. Oddly for his species, the heads see themselves as equals, while usually the right dominates the left and treats the left as a slave. The heads are possibly in love with each other.
- Toby (voiced by Pete Holmes) – A fish man who often point out negative or depressing facts.
- Aldermach "Mac" Maggotbone (voiced by Larry Murphy) – Callie's father and the highest ranking demon in Hell. He shows signs of having mysophobia, and wishes that Callie had been born a boy. Rather than being specifically Satan himself, "The Devil" seems to be a title that's passed onto a next candidate, like positions in royalty or government, and one that he'd like to pass down to Callie. It is possible that he is acting as a host for Satan by letting a snake with multiple mouths live inside him. He is an avid fan of the perpetually snake bitten New York Jets, possibly a play on the old expression, "God is a Yankee fan" and is seen frequently in New York Jets attire and cheering for them on television. His real name is Aldermach Maggotbone (his name most likely based on Adrammelech).
- Rosie (voiced by Julie Klausner) – Callie's human mother, separated from Callie's father the Devil. Though it's originally claimed that she was impregnated with Callie when in a cult, she actually sold her soul to Aldermach shortly after they first met so that she could have a baby. However, she truly loves her daughter, claiming Callie was the best thing to come from the union. Rosie's relationship with Aldermach is shown to be strained most of the time with one episode revealing they argue almost constantly, but her relationship with Mark is much better. Her character appears to be modeled after Rosemary Woodhouse from the movie Rosemary's Baby as the story of Callie's conception is similar to the story in the movie and the character looks like Mia Farrow who played Rosemary in the movie.
- Grimes' Goon Squad – Shown doing all of Grimes dirty deeds when he is not around. Loyal to Grimes, but not afraid to leave him behind if it means their lives, just as Grimes would them.
- Girl Anchor – A news anchor that reports on New York. Always seen smiling even when saying horrible things.
- Melchior (voiced by Randy Pearlstein) – Leonard's hologram. Originally used by Leonard as a means to communicate with Mark when he is away, or to perform menial tasks for Leonard, but took on a life and personality of his own in "Kill, Mark... Kill!".
- Buddha – A walking, talking golden statue who wears a prayer beads necklace and always bares his large belly.
- Medusa – A gorgon with green snakes for hair and light blue skin.
- Amoeba – An amoeba that reproduces asexually, yet still manages to get laid frequently.

=== Minor characters ===
- Krystal – The girl Randall turned zombie for. She is constantly changing attractions to different species and was already out of her zombie phase when Randall got back to her after going zombie. However, Randall continues to stalk her, having problems admitting the relationship is over, let alone that it never started.
- Kid Wizard (voiced by Devin Clark) – A young wizard who is often giving people the finger.
- Ratso Demon – A nod to Dustin Hoffman's character Enrico "Ratso" Rizzo from Midnight Cowboy, this demon wears a trench coat, has a five o'clock shadow and slicks his hair back. Ends every sentence with "ova heah".
- Mark's Mom – Seen to have slept with Clark Dungaree. Mark has dreamed about her in crotchless panties.
- Lillith Maggotbone (voiced by Julie Klausner) – Callie Maggotbone's sister in the episode "Callie and Her Sister" who was born very shortly after Aldremach and Callie's human mother got back together for a very short time. Lilith was born one day after she was conceived in Mark Lilly's apartment on a pool table. Due to a massive amount of hormone injections her mother was taking, so she also aged at an accelerated rate of one year per day. After Lilith was born, Aldremach decided to make Lilith marry Twayne Boneraper instead of Callie. Lilith appears to be more evil than Callie due to the constant use of her powers to harm people.
- Angie - a facegina woman who appears in the Pilot.

== Episodes ==
Season	Episodes	Originally aired	
Season	Episodes	First aired	Last aired
1	14	March 17, 2010	November 17, 2010
2	17	June 30, 2011	April 25, 2012

The first episode premiered on March 17, 2010, following the 14th season premiere of South Park, "Sexual Healing". It was watched by over 2 million viewers. On April 21, 2010, Comedy Central announced that they had ordered 7 additional episodes of Ugly Americans, to begin airing in October 2010. On December 15, Comedy Central announced that they picked up the show for a second 14-episode season, which was later expanded to 17 episodes. The first 10 episodes of the second season aired in the summer of 2011 following Futurama and the remaining 7 episodes aired from March 14, 2012, following South Park.

== Critical reception ==
Ugly Americans holds a Metascore of 60, gaining positive reviews from the likes of Entertainment Weekly and The Washington Post. Variety's Brian Lowry called it "more a triumph of design and concept than execution" and added, "Not everything works, but with its bountiful supply of visual gags, Americans is just goofy enough to be good." Alex Zalben of UGO Networks, commending its mix of slapstick and intelligent humor, as well as actually building relatable characters, says the show "is easily the best animated show on Comedy Central since South Park." David Hinckley of the New York Daily News stated, "If Ugly Americans comes with a message, it is at least equally determined to just be funny, and at that task, it frequently succeeds. The variety of odd creatures keep the visual gags going, and the dialogue runs steadily toward droll."

Largely due to its visual gags and morbid, offbeat humor, the series has also gained negative reception from publications such as the Pittsburgh Post-Gazette and the Deseret News. Kris King of Slant Magazine gave Ugly Americans a 50/100 rating and claimed, "The show's dry humor, mixed with a rather troubling visual style where everything is stiff and vaguely deformed, mostly just makes you feel uneasy." IGN's Ramsey Isler also gave the pilot episode a 5/10, stating, "The show struggles to find some kind of funny [...] The whole thing feels more like a film student project that just didn't quite work out."

== See also ==
- Aaahh!!! Real Monsters
